= Nose ring =

Nose ring may refer to:

- A nose ring in humans is also known as a nose piercing, including:
  - Nose-jewel, associated with the Indian subcontinent and mentioned in the Bible
  - Mola (art form), a cultural practice featuring nose rings
  - A sign of a Meghwal woman's marital status; see Meghwal
  - A part of a Sikh wedding ceremony; see Anand Karaj
- Nose ring (animals)
- A part of a traditional fish trap; see Putcher fishing
