= Livestock crush =

Strongly built livestock holding stall

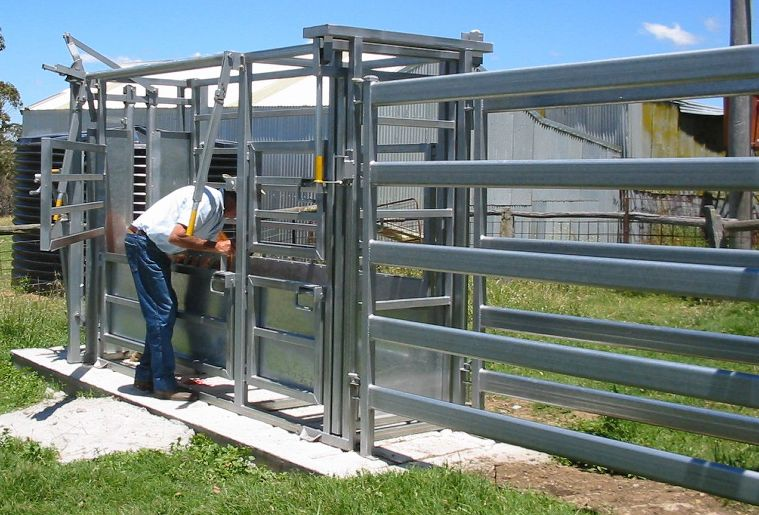
A cattle crush and an anti-bruise race in Australia

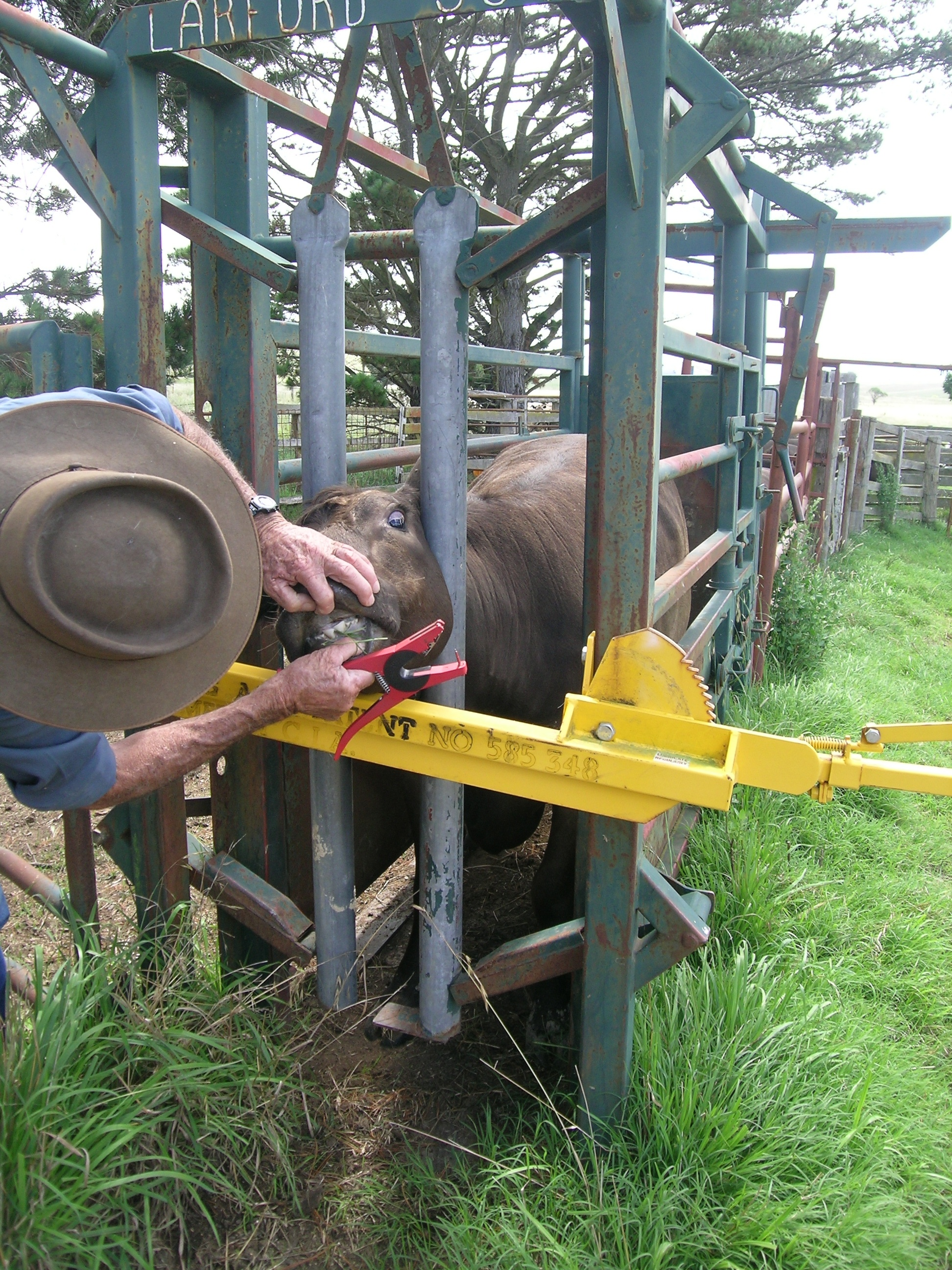
Chin (or neck) bar in operation during mouthing

A cattle crush (in UK, New Zealand, Ireland, Botswana and Australia), squeeze chute (North America), cattle chute (North America), standing stock, or simply stock (North America, Ireland) is a strongly built stall or cage for holding cattle, horses, or other livestock safely while they are examined, marked, or given veterinary treatment. Cows may be made to suckle calves in a crush. For the safety of the animal and the people attending it, a close-fitting crush may be used to ensure the animal stands "stock still". The overall purpose of a crush is to hold an animal still to minimise the risk of injury to both the animal and the operator while work on the animal is performed.

== Construction ==
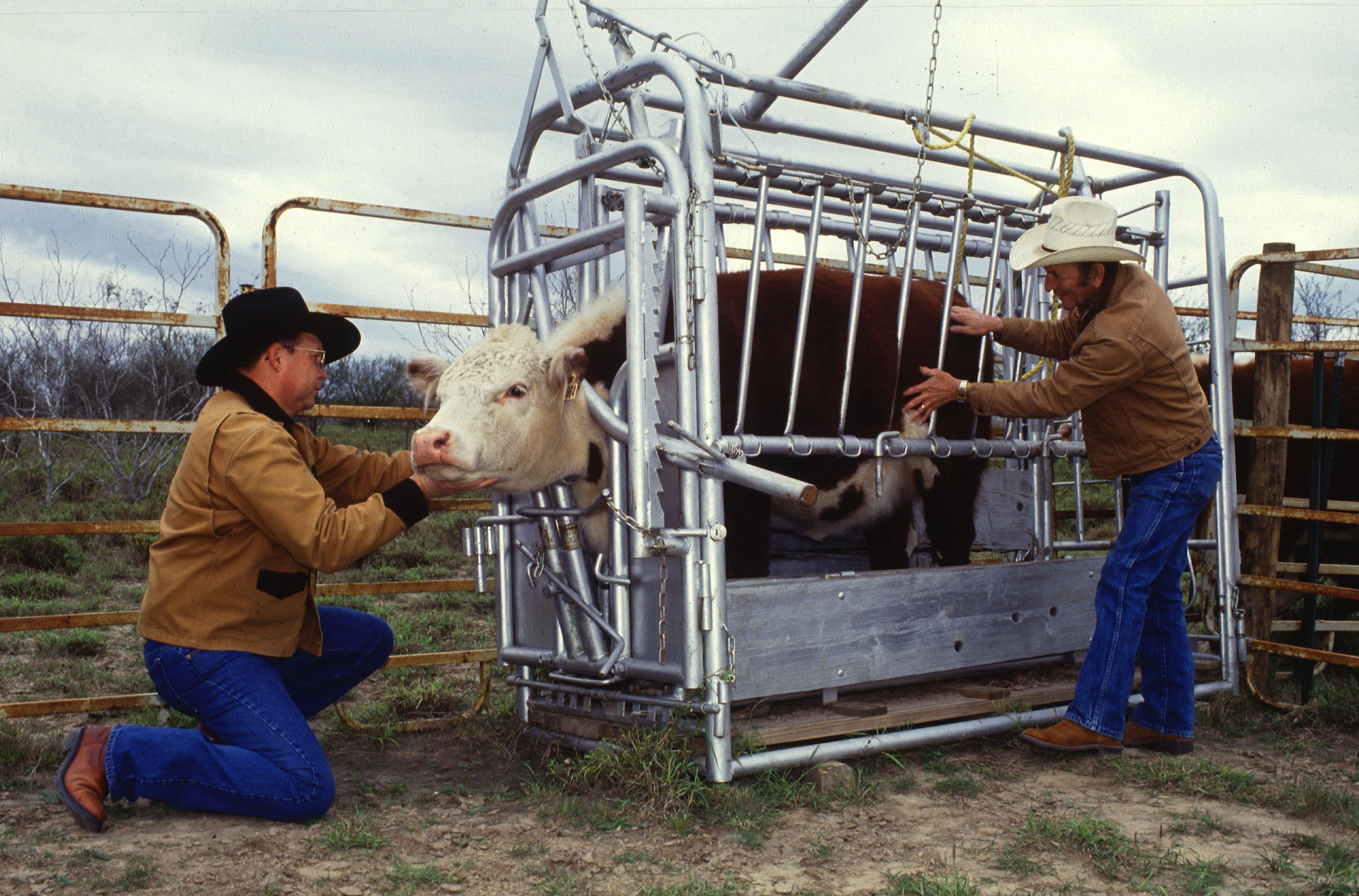
A portable crush

Crushes were traditionally manufactured from wood; this, however, was prone to deterioration from the elements over time, as well as having the potential to splinter and cause injury to the animal. In recent years, most budget-quality crushes have been built using standard heavy steel pipe that is welded together, while superior quality crushes are now manufactured using doubly symmetric oval tubing for increasing bending strength, bruise minimisation and stiffness in stockyard applications. In Australia, the steel itself should ideally be manufactured to High Tensile Grade 350LO - 450LO and conform to Australian Standards AS 1163 for structural steel.

Cattle crushes may be fully fixed or mobile; however, most crushes are best classified as semipermanent, being potentially movable but designed to primarily stay in one place. A cattle crush is typically linked to a cattle race (also known as an alley). The front end has a head bail (or neck yoke or head gate) to catch the animal and may have a baulk gate that swings aside to assist in catching the beast. The bail is often adjustable to accommodate animals of different sizes. This bail may incorporate a chin or neck bar to hold the animal's head still. A side lever operates the head bail to capture the animals, with the better types having a rear drop-away safety lever for easier movement of the cattle into the bail. Usually, smaller animals can walk through the head bails incorporated in crushes.

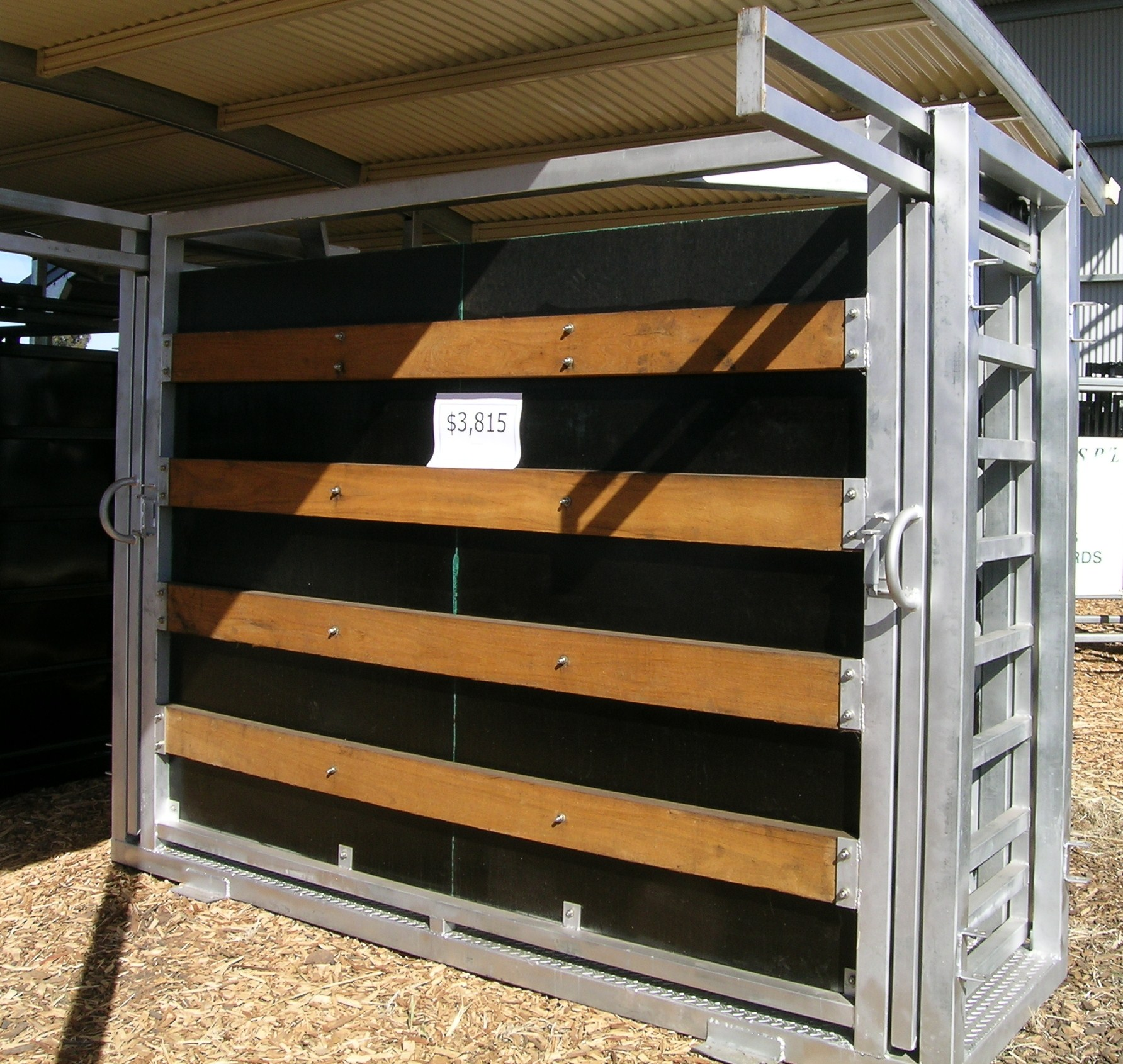
Scanning and weighing crush with timber and belting sides to increase the accuracy of ear tag scanning

Lower side panels and/or gates of sheet metal, timber or conveyor belting are used in some cases to ensure animals' legs do not get caught and reduce the likelihood of operator injury. At least one side gate is usually split to allow access to various parts of the animal being held, as well as providing access to feed a calf, amongst other things. A squeeze crush has a manual or hydraulic mechanism to squeeze the animal from the sides, immobilizing the animal while keeping bruising to a minimum. A sliding entrance gate, operated from the side of the crush, is set a few feet behind the captured animal to allow for clearance and prevent other animals entering. Crushes will, in many cases, have a single or split veterinary gate that swings behind the animal to improve operator safety, while preventing the animal from moving backwards by a horizontal rump bar inserted just behind its haunches into one of a series of slots. If this arrangement is absent, a palpation cage can be added to the crush for veterinary use when artificial insemination or pregnancy testing is being performed, or for other uses. Older crushes can also be found to have a guillotine gate that is also operated from the side via rope or chain where the gate is raised up for the animal to go under upon entering the crush, and then let down behind the animal.

A crush is a permanent fixture in slaughterhouses, because the animal is carried on a conveyor restrainer under its belly, with its legs dangling in a slot on either side. Carried in this manner, the animal is unable to move either forward or backward by its own volition.

Some mobile crushes are equipped with a set of wheels so they can be towed from yard to yard. A few of these portable crushes are built so the crush may also be used as a portable loading ramp. A mobile crush must incorporate a strong floor, to prevent the animal moving it by walking along the ground.

Crushes vary in sophistication, according to requirements and cost. The simplest are just a part of a cattle race (alley) with a suitable head bail. More complex ones incorporate features such as automatic catching systems, hatches (to gain access to various parts of the animal), winches (to raise the feet or the whole animal), constricting sides to hold the animal firmly (normal in North American slaughterhouses), a rocking floor to prevent kicking or a weighing mechanism.

== Specialist crushes ==
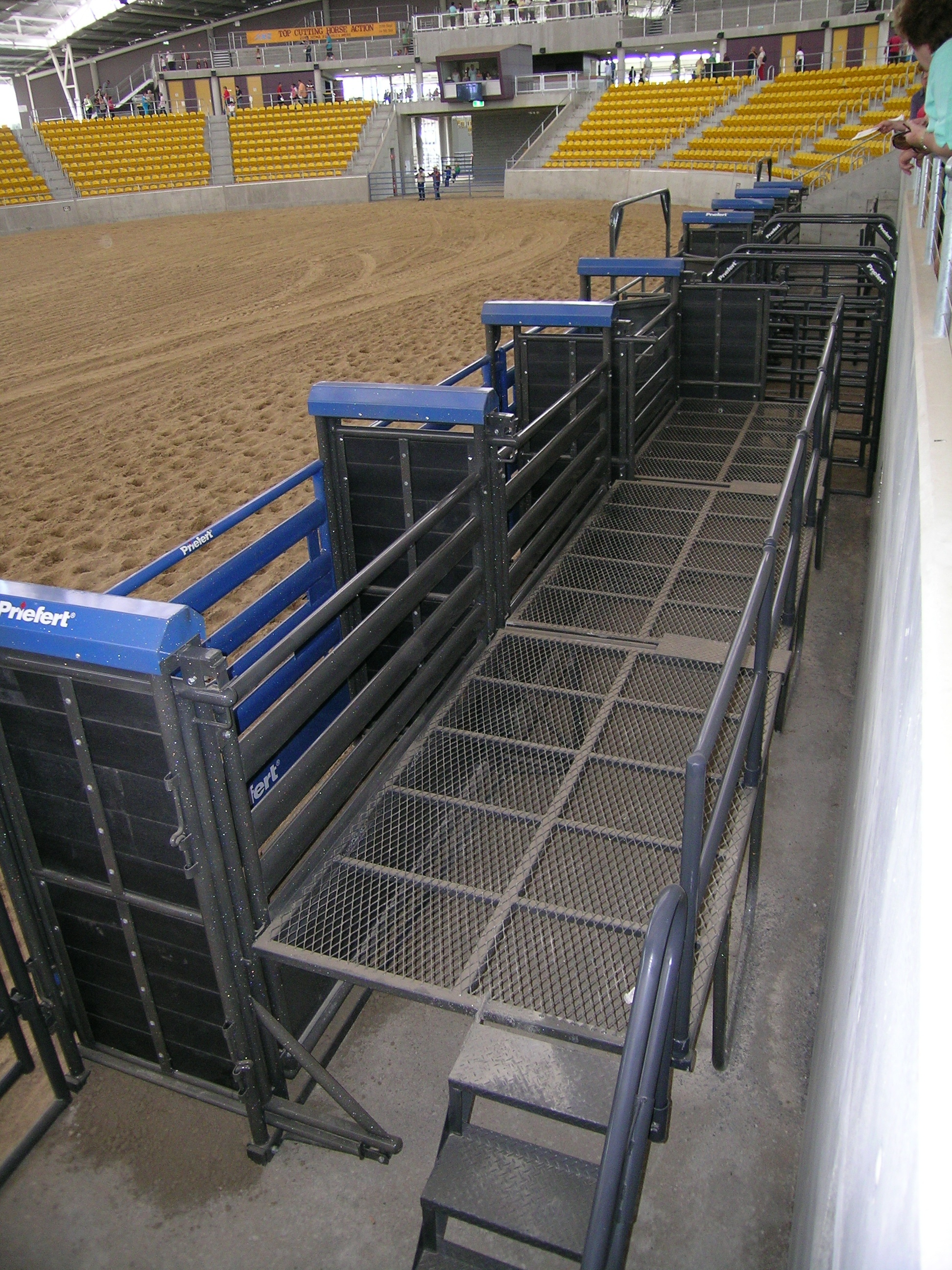
Indoor rough-riding chutes, AELEC, Tamworth, New South Wales

Specialist crushes are made for various purposes. For example, those designed for cattle with very long horns (such as Highland cattle or Texas Longhorn cattle) are low-sided or very wide, to avoid damage to the horns. Other specialist crushes include those for tasks such as automatic scanning, foot-trimming or clipping the hair under the belly, and smaller crushes (calf cradles) for calves.

Standing stocks for cattle and horses are more commonly stand-alone units, not connected to races (alleys) except for handling animals not accustomed to being handled. These stand-alone units may be permanent or portable. Some portable units disassemble for transport to shows and sales. These units are used during grooming and also with veterinary procedures performed with the animal standing, especially if it requires heavy sedation, or to permit surgery under sedation rather than general anesthesia. For some surgical procedures, this is reported to be efficient. These units also are used during some procedures that require a horse to stand still, but without sedation.

There are two different types of specialised crushes used in rodeo arenas. Those for the "rough stock" events, such as bronc riding and bull riding, are known as bucking chutes or rough-riding chutes. For events such as calf roping, steer roping and team roping, the crush is called a roping chute. The rough-riding chutes are notably higher in order to hold adult bucking horses and bulls, and have platforms and rail spacing that allows riders and assistants to access the animal from above. These chutes release the animal and the rider through a side gate. A roping chute is large enough to contain a steer of the size used in steer wrestling and may also have a seat above the chute for an operator. The steer or calf is released through the front of the chute.

== Hoof trimming crush ==
A hoof trimming crush, also called a hoof trimming chute or hoof trimming stalls, is a crush specifically designed for the task of caring for cattle hooves, specifically trimming excess hoof material and cleaning. Such crushes range from simple standing frameworks to highly complex fixed or portable devices where much or all of the process is mechanised. Many standard crushes now come with optional fitting kits to add to a non-foot trimming crush.

== Integrated weighing systems ==
In recent years, crushes are often integrated with weighing systems. The crush provides the ideal opportunity to weigh and measure the animal while it is safely contained within the unit.

== History ==
Many cattle producers managed herds with nothing more than a race (alley) and a headgate (or a rope) until tagging requirements and disease control necessitated the installation of crushes.

In the past the principal use of the crush, in England also known as a trevis, was for the shoeing of oxen. Crushes were, and in places still are, used for this purpose in North America and in many European countries. They were usually stand-alone constructions of heavy timbers or stone columns and beams. Some crushes were simple, without a head bail or yoke, while others had more sophisticated restraints and mechanisms; a common feature is a belly sling which allows the animal to be partly or wholly raised from the ground. In Spain, the crush was a village community resource and is called potro de herrar, or "shoeing frame". In France it is called travail à ferrer (plural travails, not travaux) or "shoeing trevis", and was associated with blacksmith shops. Although the word travail derives from Latin tripalium, "three beams", all surviving examples but that at Roissard have four columns. In central Italy it is called a travaglio, but in Sardinia is referred to as Sardinian: sa macchina po ferrai is boisi, or "the machine for shoeing the oxen". In the United States it was called an ox sling, an ox press or shoeing stalls. In some countries, including the Netherlands and France, horses were commonly shod in the same structures. In the United States similar but smaller structures, usually called horse shoeing stocks, are still in use, primarily to assist farriers in supporting the weight of the horse's hoof and leg when shoeing draft horses.

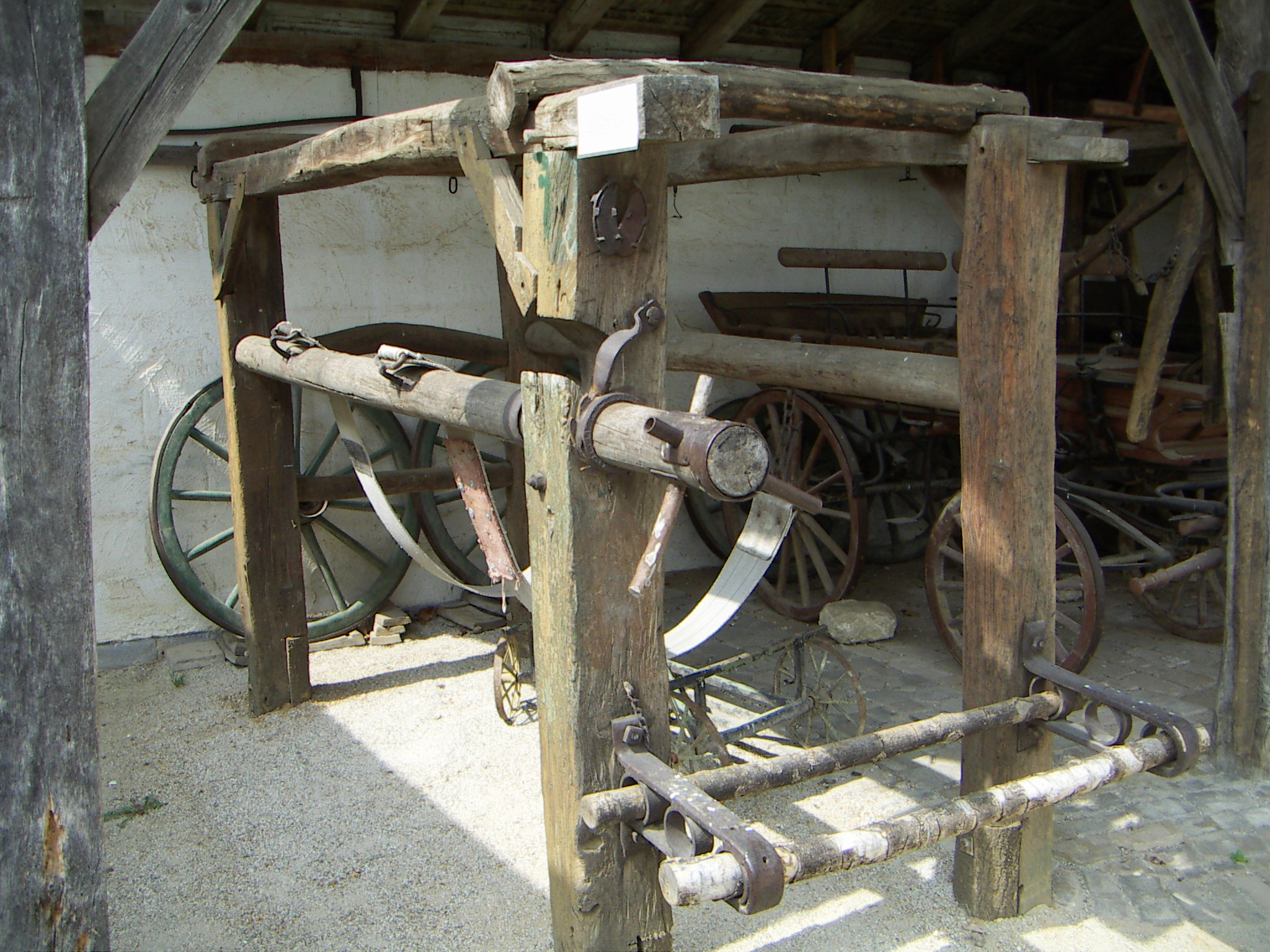
Ox shoeing sling in the Dorfmuseum of Mönchhof, Austria; a pair of ox shoes is attached to the near left column.

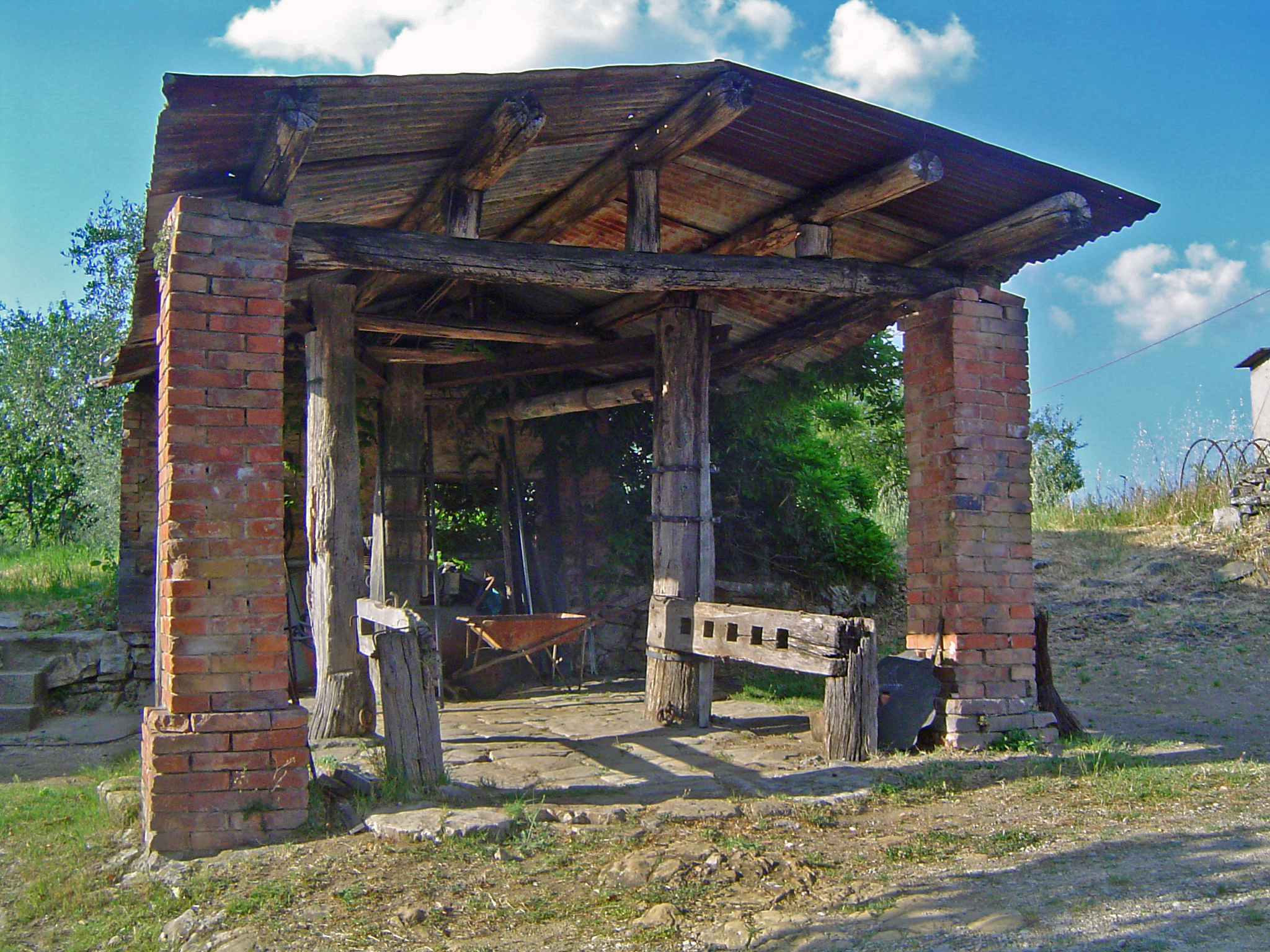
Roofed ox shoeing crush of three-column construction in Pievasciata, Castelnuovo Berardenga, Siena, Italy

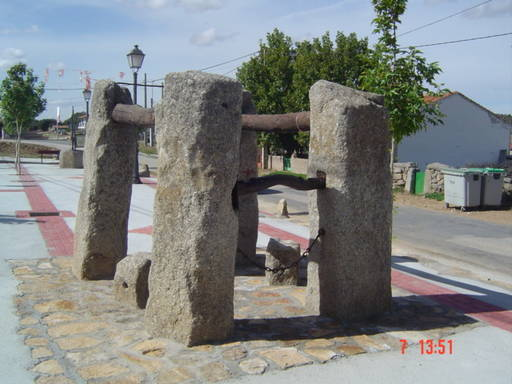
In Villar de Corneja (Ávila), Spain, the community potro de herrar includes a piece of the yoke used to limit movement of the animal's head.

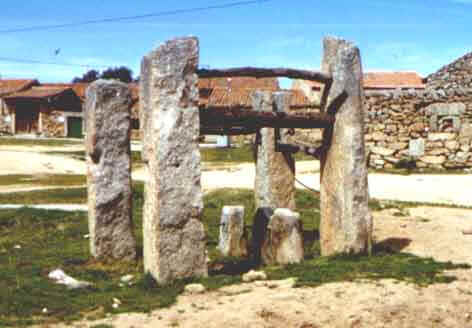
In Navamorales (Salamanca), Spain, the community potro de herrar has a stone belly block to further limit the animal's freedom of movement.

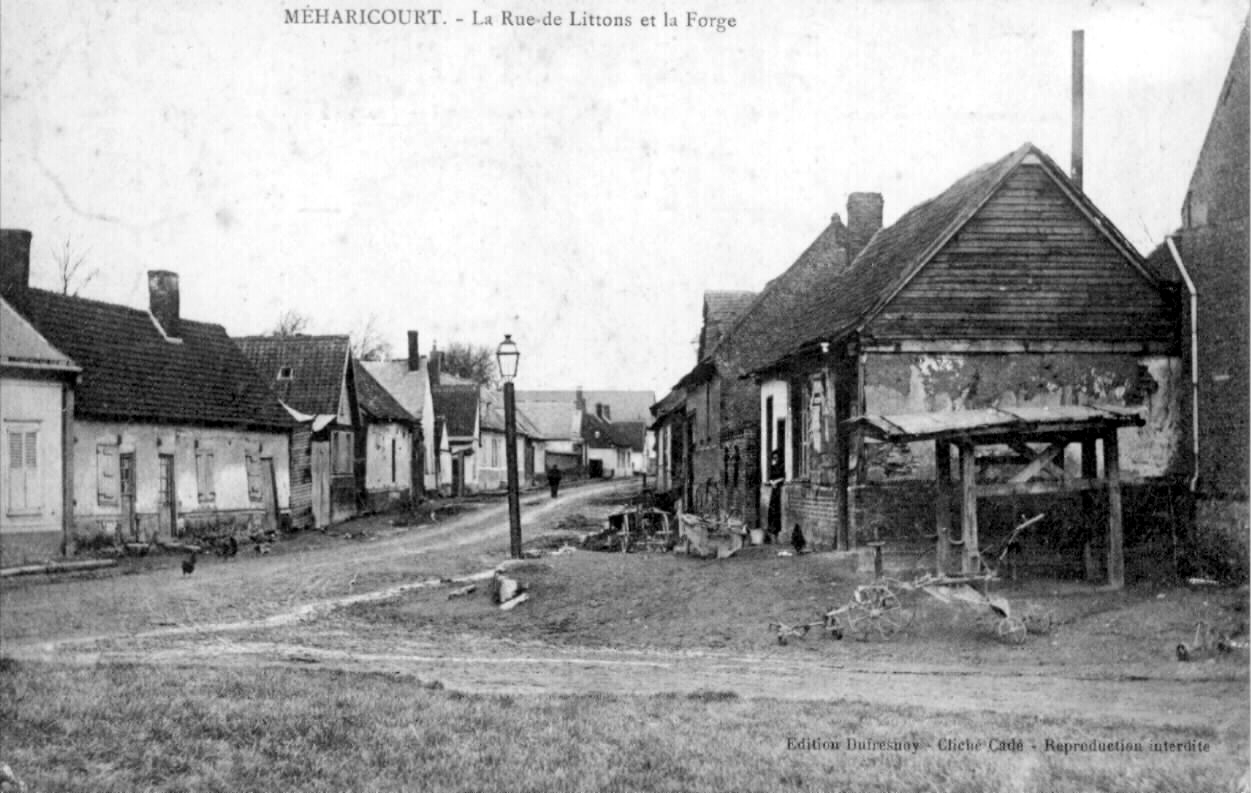
Historic French travail

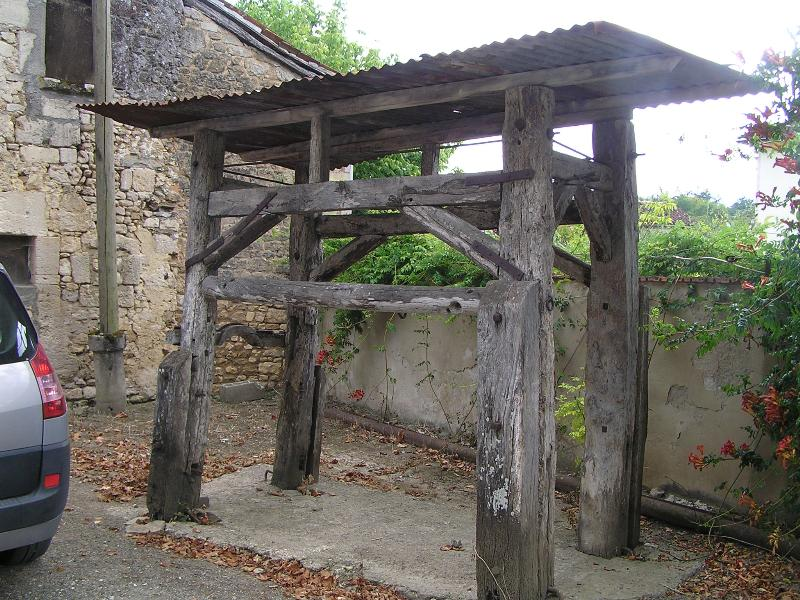
A travail in Saint-Sulpice-de-Cognac (Charente), France

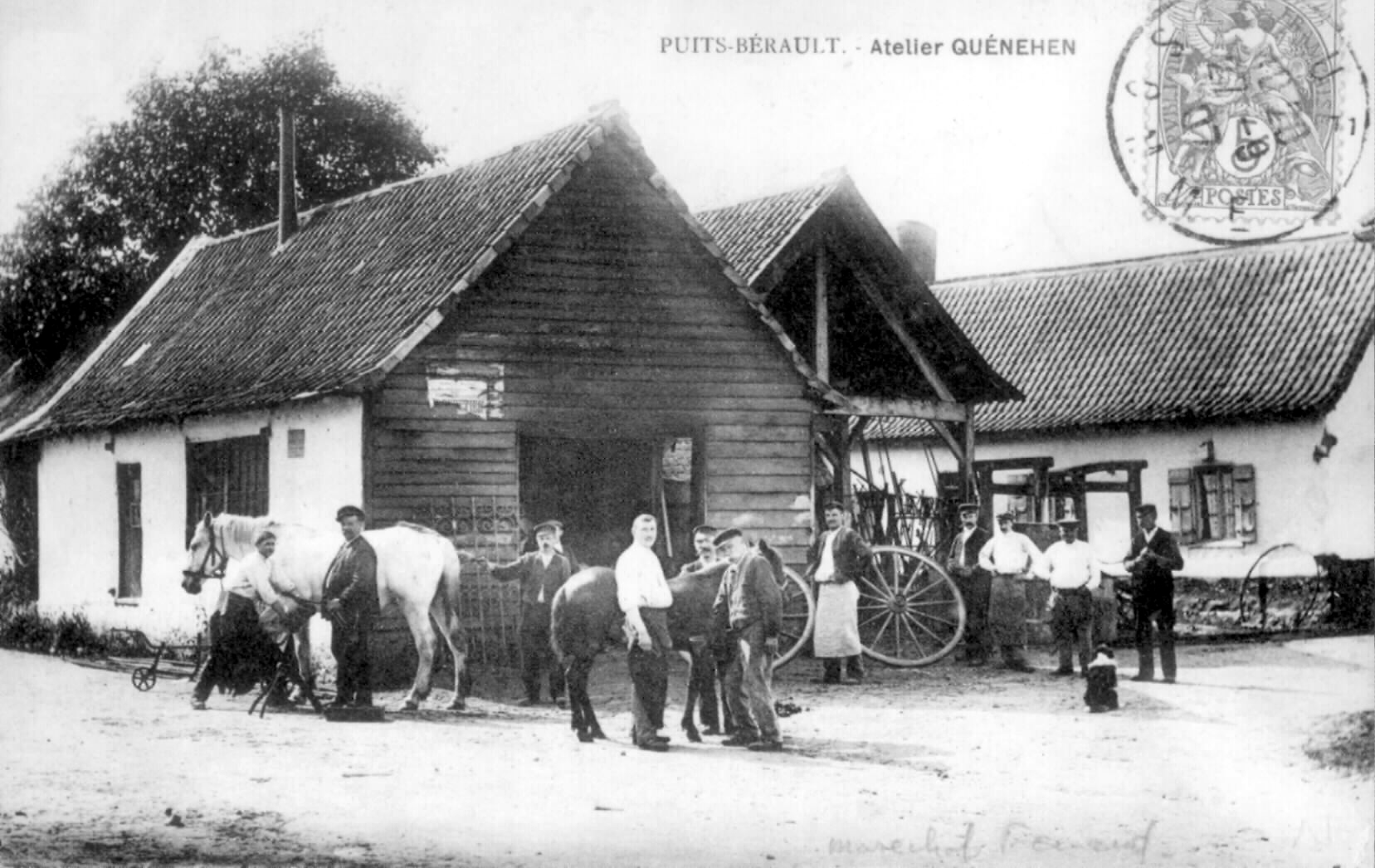
A French travail is in the background, between buildings, of this 1905 blacksmithy.

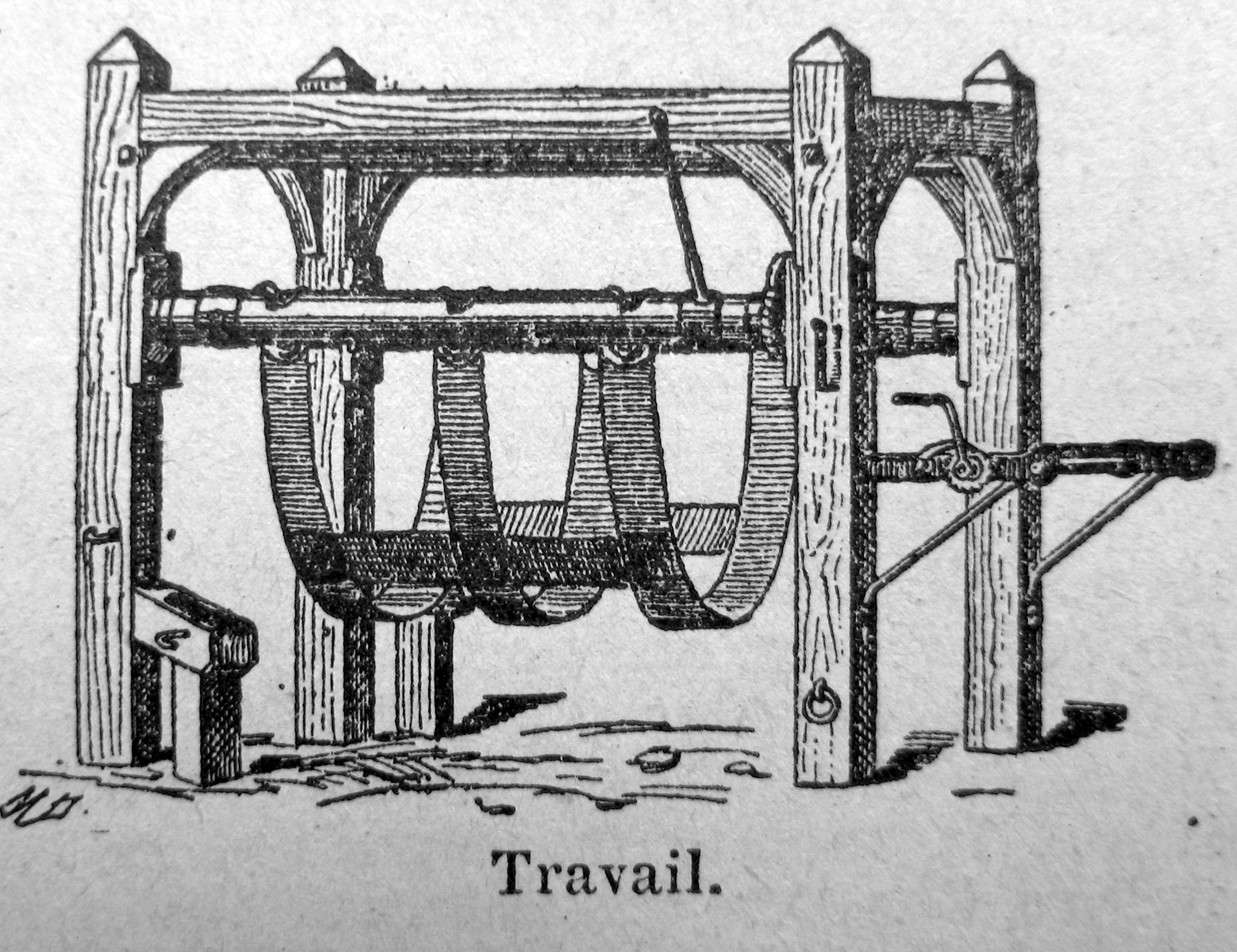
Illustration in a 1925 book from France

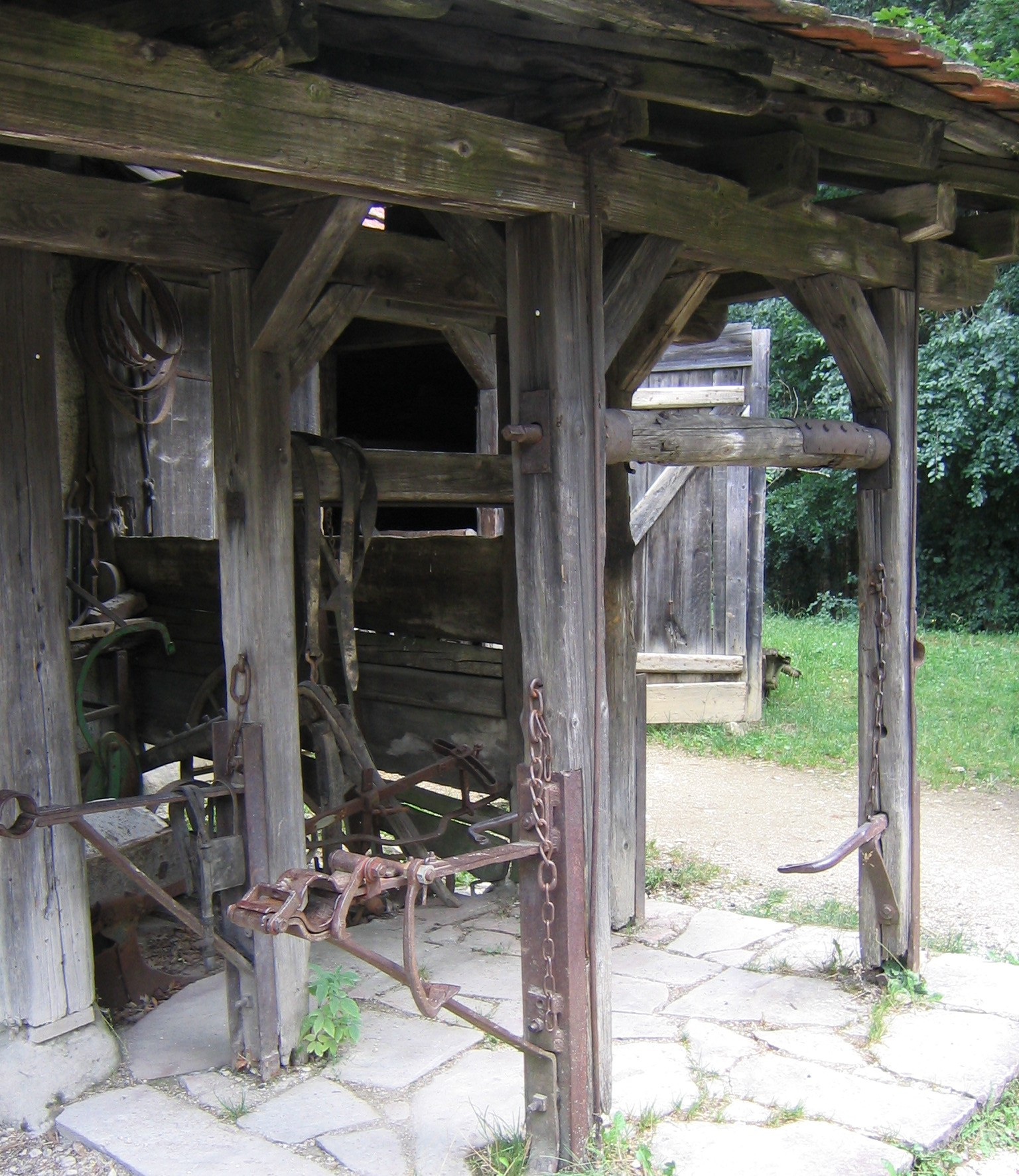
A Klauenstand in a living history museum in Neuhausen ob Eck (Baden-Wuerttemberg, Germany)
