= Nose piercing =

Piercing of the skin or cartilage of the nose for wearing jewelry

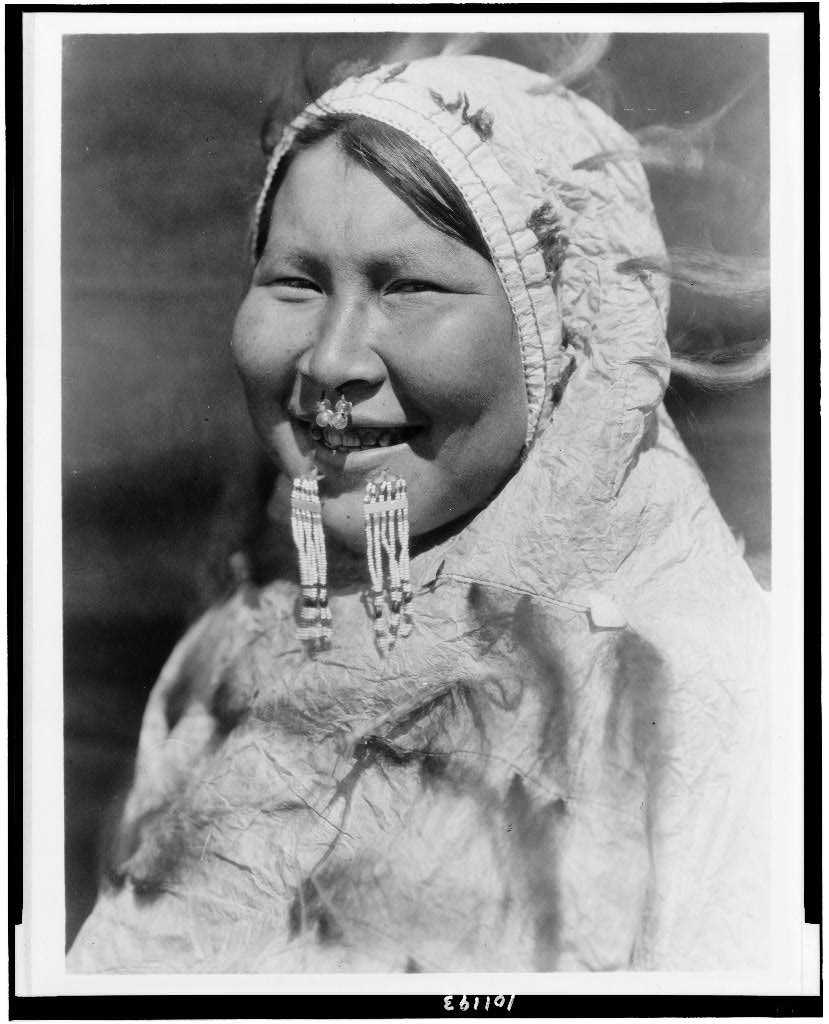
- Alaska woman wearing nose ring and labret piercing, Nunivak Island, 1929
- Nicknames: Nostril ring, nose ring, septum piercing
- Location: Nose (nostril, nasal septum, nose bridge)
- Jewelry: Nose stud, nose bone, circular barbell, curved barbell, captive bead ring
- Healing: 3 to 4 months for nostril and bridge, 1.5 to 2 for septum

Nose piercing is the piercing of the skin or cartilage which forms any part of the nose, normally for the purpose of wearing jewelry, called a nose-jewel. Among the different varieties of nose piercings, the nostril piercing is the most common.

== History ==
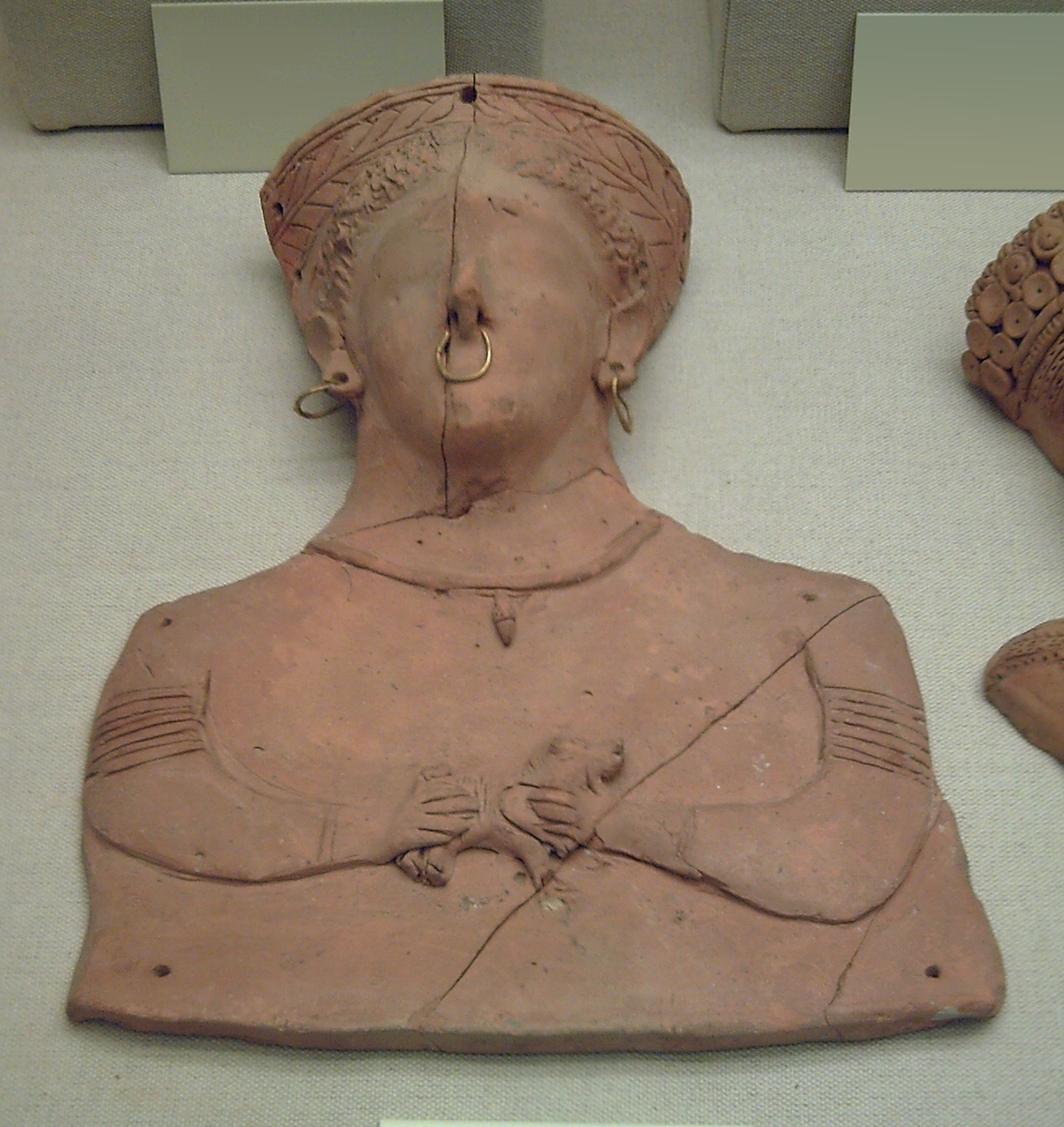
Carthaginian female figure with gold nose piercing, 400–201 BCE

Nose piercing is recorded in various parts of the world, including in some indigenous societies of Americas and Australia.

Earliest written evidence of nose piercing appears in the Hebrew Bible, such as Genesis 24:22 and Isaiah 3:21. According to Barry Ladizinski et al. 2013, "The practice, which is performed for symbolic or beautification purposes, originated more than 4000 years ago in the Middle East, migrating to India in the 1500s and reaching Western civilization by the 20th century."

Nose piercing remains a significant cultural and aesthetic practice, symbolizing beauty, identity, and tradition across diverse societies worldwide.

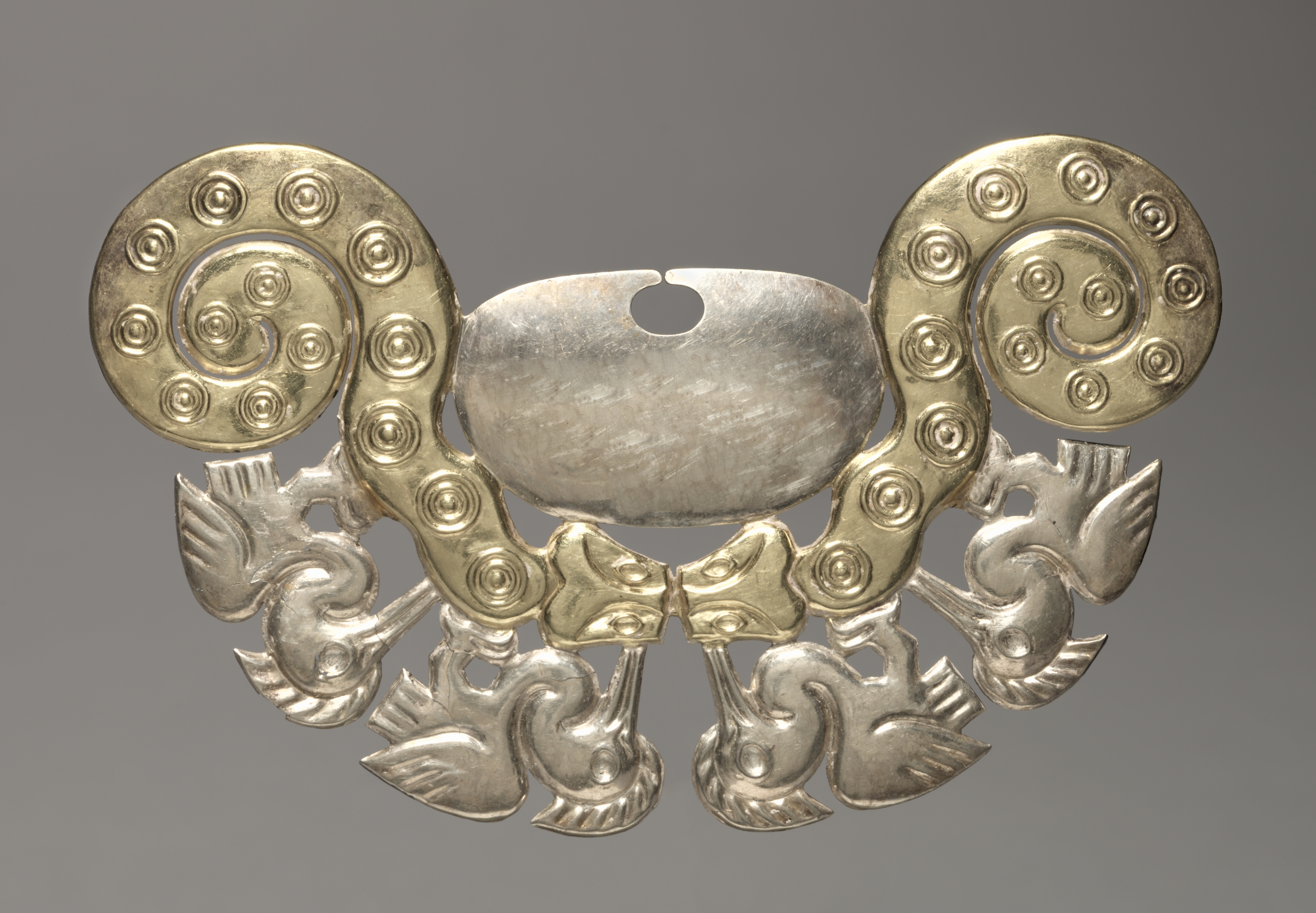
Nose ornament from the Moche culture, c. 100–300 CE

In the Americas, nose piercing can be dated through pre-Columbian and colonial times throughout North and South America. Numerous status ceremonies are carved into the North Temple of the Great Ballcourt at Chichin Itza. One of these ceremonies is a nose piercing ritual that is illustrated on the North Temple vault. Rather than depicting sacrifice, the common theme of the temple's carvings, the central figure is shown aiming what most likely is a bone awl to pierce the figure's nose. The ritual of the nostril piercing signified the elevated status of this figure. His place in society is symbolized by his nose piercing. Similarly, nose piercing signified elevated status in Colonial Highland Maya. The two prominent lords, Ajpop and the Ajpop K'ama, of the K'iche were pierced through the nose at the pinnacle of an elaborate ceremony. Similar to a crowning of a king, the nose piercing was to show their newfound leadership of the K'iche.

In Yucatán, explorers Oviedo y Valdes, Herrera y Tordesillas, Diego de Landa, and Jeronimo de Aguilar all noted different nose piercings that they observed in Mayans and other cultures in Yucatán in general. They reported that different stones could have different meaning within each civilization. In addition, they believed the different placement and size and shape of beads could denote the specific society the person came from. The Toltecs were believed to have piercings through the ala of the nose that was adorned with a bead. While the Mayans pierced through the septum and consisted of an oblong bead rather than spherical.

Since the introduction and diffusion in western culture in the 1960s, punks and subsequent youth cultures of the 1980s and 1990s adopted nostril piercing. Today, nostril piercing is popular in the wider world including South America, United States of America, Canada, the Caribbean, Australia, Africa, Japan and Europe, with piercings being performed on either the left or right nostril. For some cultures, this practice is simply for ornament, while for others it is for religious practices. Initially in America, this practice was for subcultures and was seen to be associated with minority youth.

In the United States, nose piercings may have negative connotations. For example, in a 2006 survey done in the hospitality industry, 81% of hiring managers stated that piercings and tattoos affect their perception of the candidate negatively.

== Nostril piercing ==
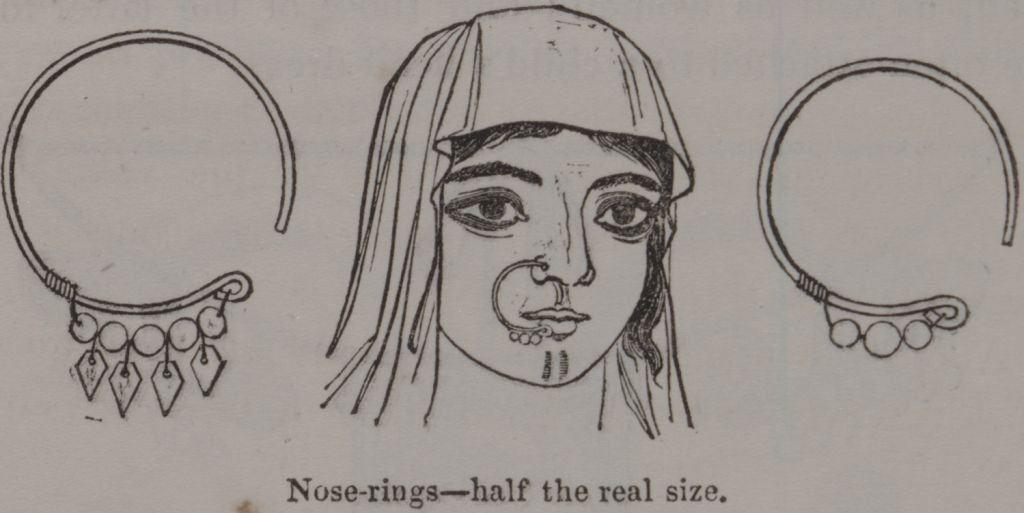
Drawing of an Egyptian woman wearing an engraved nose ring, as drawn by Edward Lane in his book An Account of the Manners and Customs of the Modern Egyptians

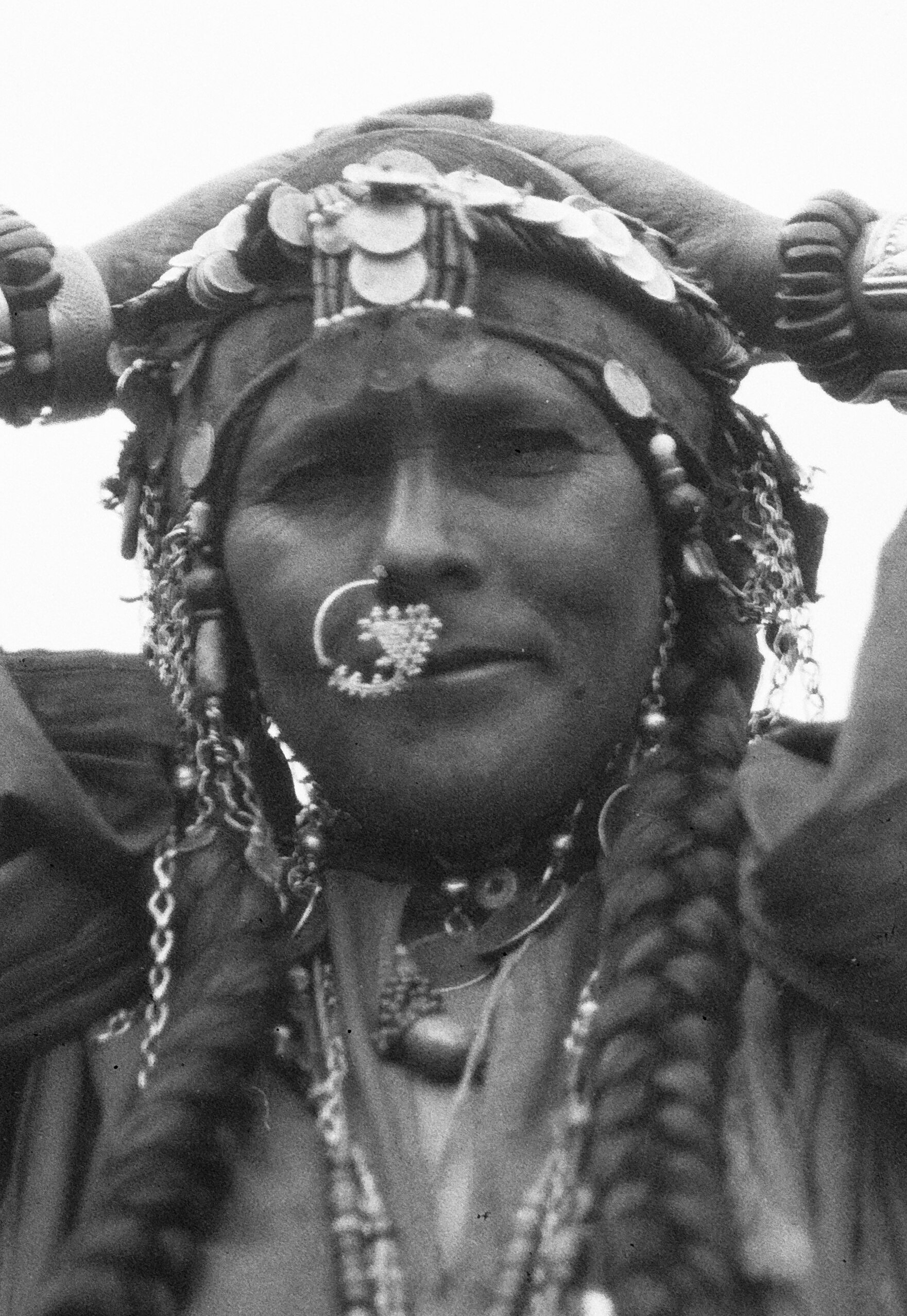
Woman with nose ornament, Palestine, c. 1920s

Nostril piercing is a body piercing practice that allows the insertion of jewelry into the nostrils. The historical record in Egypt only indicates nose piercings being worn by women. The specifics of jewelry in Egypt are regional, though some form of nose piercing has been known throughout Egypt, by urban and desert dwelling women. An exception is Siwa—while other women in Marsa Matruh wore nose rings, Siwi women do not. In Upper Egypt the nose ring is commonly called a Khuzam, a name used since the 1830s. According to Lane, the nose rings of his time were an inch to an inch and a half diameter of brass, strung with beads, and worn on the right side of the nose.

In Bahariya, the nose piercing is called the gatar or qatrah, made from 12-carat gold, with filigree and granulation. Commonly, the design is a ring with decoration around the lower half (on some nose rings, this extends to decorating inside the circle, creating a circle where half is empty and half is filled in with filigree), and a flat circle of gold applied to hide the end of the wire that goes through the nose. It is never made of silver, and women believe that the area of nose they pierce has fine blood vessels that would be harmed by silver. It is only worn by married women and is worn on the left. Traditionally the women of the region believe the nose ring, while worn, will prevent pains and headaches.

In Sinai, the nose piercing is called the shenaf, and like much of the region's jewelry, bears a resemblance to Palestinian examples. It is typically made of gold and sometimes will have colored beads worked into the design. Pieces that dangle from the main ring are common.

Sudanese woman with zimam

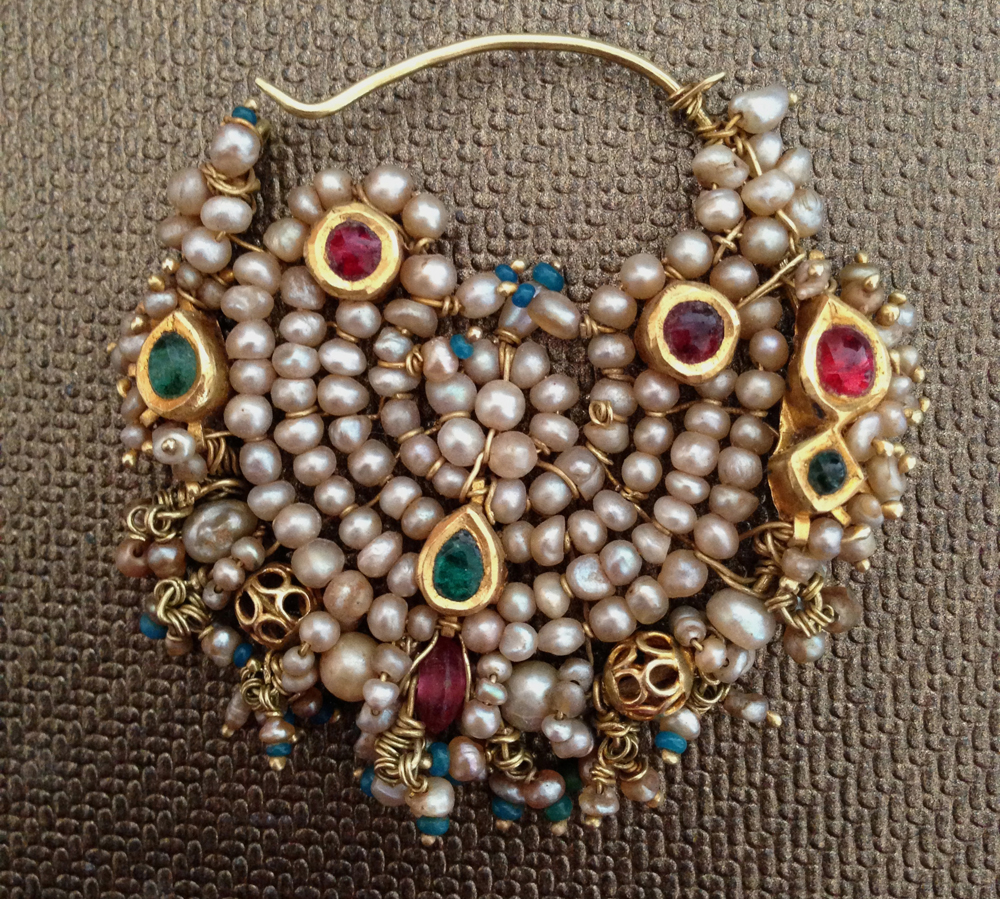
Nose ornament called Nath, 19th century, India

In Nubian Egypt and Sudan, the nose ring is called a zimam. The Rashayda call it by the same name and make it from 21-carat gold. The Bishariya also wear a nose ring- there is some overlap between the three groups jewelry, as they live in proximity and would buy jewelry from the same cities. The nose rings of the Rashayda have a similar shape to the small nose rings of Bahariya with a thickened decoration around the lower half, but do not employ filigree. Some nose rings in the region are similar to Lane's drawing from 1836, being just a wire with some beads strung on it.

In Central Asia, nose piercings are called Arawak or Arabek and were introduced to the region during Arab conquests. Uzbek women traditionally wore nose piercing called Arawak as part of traditional attire. In Eastern Europe, some Nogai and Tatar women were also known to wear similar nose rings in the nostrils and septum.

In South Asia, nose piercings were introduced as early as 10th century and were common across South Asia by the 15th century. Historian A.S Altekar suggests that nose piercings have not been mentioned in Indian literature before the 8th century and was likely introduced after this period. According to historian Benoytosh Bhattacharya, the 12th-century text Manasollasa mentions various ornaments worn by women, but does not mention ornaments for the nose, which were likely introduced by Muslims after the 12th century. Jewelry historian Oppi Untracht suggests that nose piercings were introduced in the 13th century by Muslims and was quickly established over the years. As a cultural practice, nose rings are one of the ornaments associated with married women in South Asia among both Hindus and Muslims in various diverse regional cultures.

== Septum piercing ==
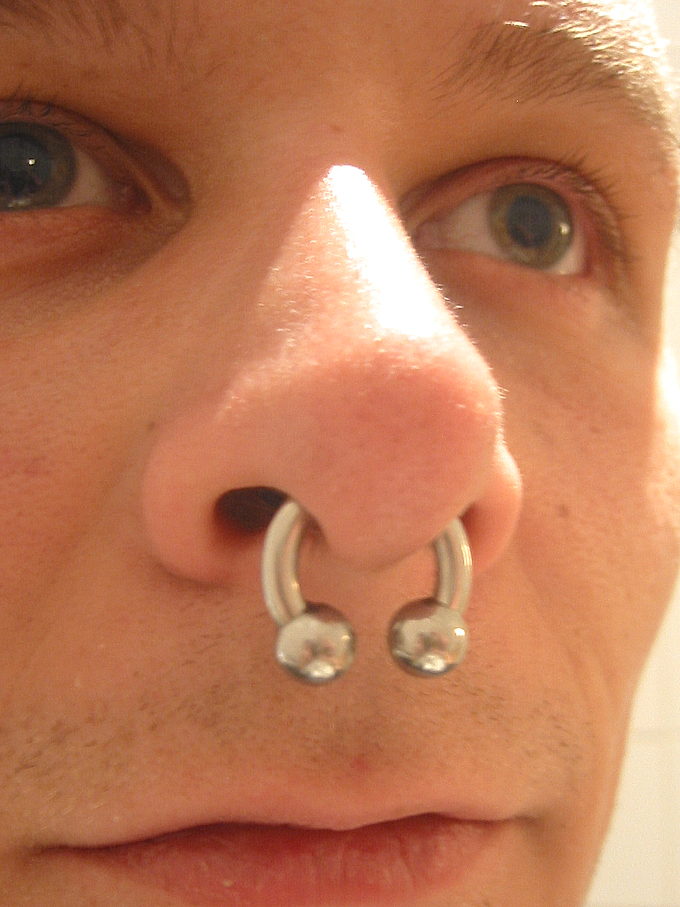
Large-gauge septum piercing

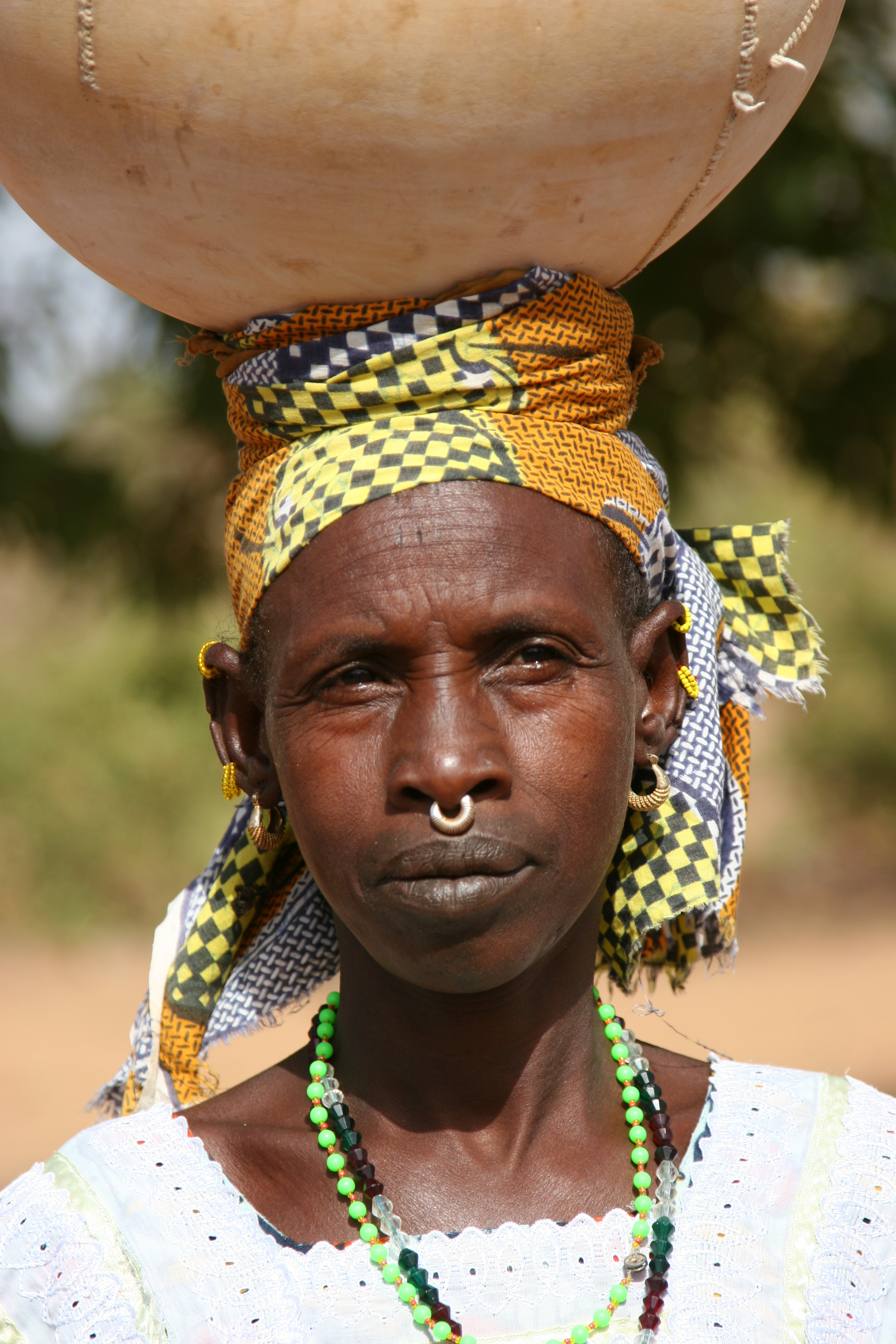
Fulani woman with traditional nose ring and mouth tattoo

The nasal septum is the cartilaginous dividing wall between the nostrils. Generally, the cartilage itself is not pierced, but rather the small gap between the cartilage and the bottom of the nose (sometimes called the "sweet spot" by piercers), typically at 16g (1.2 mm) although it is often stretched to a larger gauge (size). This piercing heals within a month and a half to three months also depending on the individual. It should only be stretched by 1mm at a time, and waiting at least a month between stretches is advisable. If a certain point is exceeded, usually about 8mm, the cartilage gets forced towards the top of the nose, which can be uncomfortable.

Many types of jewelry generally are worn in a septum piercing, such as: Captive bead rings (CBRs), rings that close with a bead held in the center by the tension of the ring, circular barbells (as shown in the picture), a circular bar with a bead that screws onto either end, a "tusk" that is a straight or shaped piece of material generally tapered on either end, or pinchers. For large gauge septums, many individuals choose to wear plugs, as the plugs do not weigh their noses down, which is helpful in healing. This measure allows the piercing not to be damaged by the sudden movement of the jewelry.

Another option is a septum retainer, which is staple-shaped. This type of nose piercing is particularly easy to hide when desired, for example to comply with a dress code. A septum retainer makes possible turning the jewelry up into the nose, thus concealing it. With black jewelry flipped up into the nostrils, this piercing can be made practically invisible. A circular barbell can also be hidden by pushing it to the back into the nose, but it may be uncomfortable.

=== Cultural traditions ===
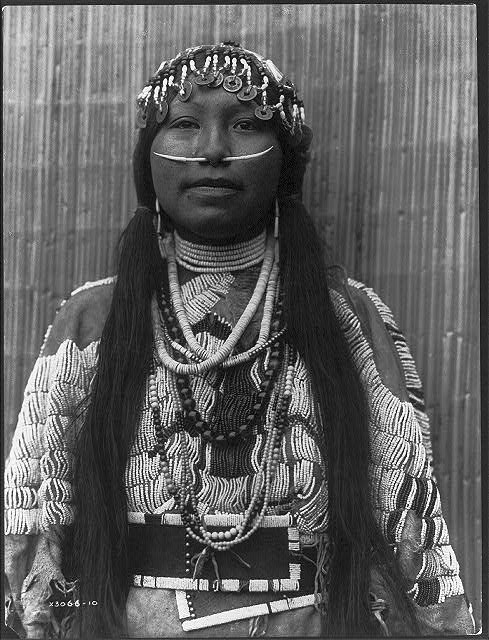
Nose ornament made of shell, North America, c. 1910

In ancient Carthage, septum piercings were worn by both Carthaginian men and women. These were commonly made of gold, some examples in silver are also known.

Septum piercing is noted in several Native American peoples in history; the Shawnee leaders Tecumseh and Tenskwatawa, for example, had such piercings.

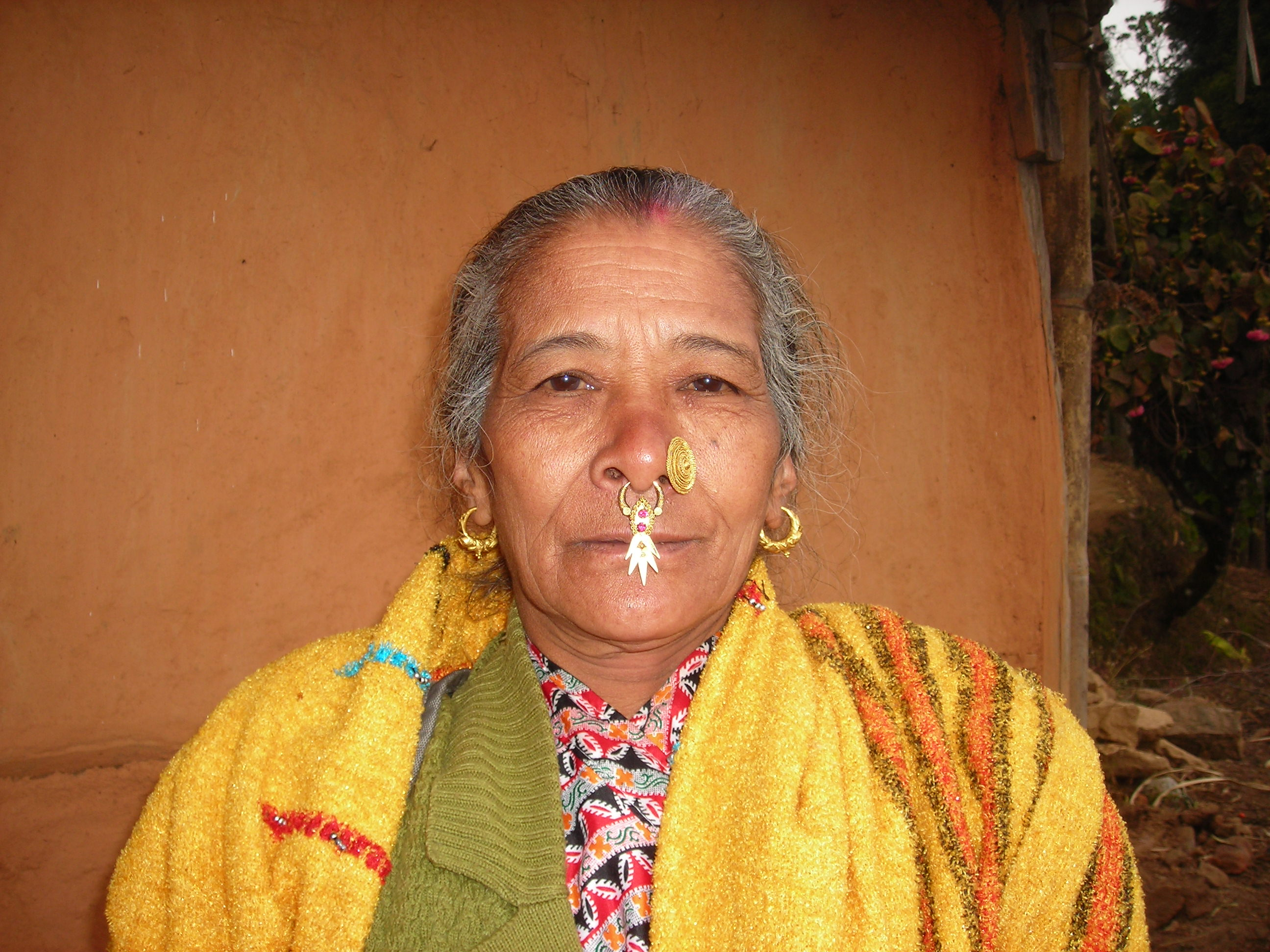
A woman in eastern Nepal wearing Jhamke Bulaki (a septum ring with ornamental designs)

The septum piercing is often worn with nostril piercings in India, Nepal, and Bangladesh. In India, such piercing is called the Nathori and Bulak. Septum piercing is also worn by Kuchipudi and Bharatnatyam dancers called bullakku or pullakku in south. Bengali women traditionally would wear the nathori along with nostril nath as a sign of being a married woman. The nathori would be gold with a tear drop that would move along the ring. Many lower-class women in rural Bengal still keep this tradition. This practice is now declining as many women prefer the smaller nose studs.

In hilly region of Nepal, the septum piercing is known as Bulaki and is worn by women of multiple ethnic groups. In Southern region of Nepal the septum piercing is still common. Many older women still adorn their noses with both the septum and left nostril rings. Many women have gold nose piercings to show their social, tribal, and religious status in society.

In Central Australia, nose piercing was central to the development of a boy to a man. For the Arunta, an Aboriginal group in Central Australia, it is a rite of passage for a boy. The rite of passage began with dancing ceremonies and developed into the boy moving to the men's camp and learning to hunt. The boys are usually between the ages of eleven and thirteen. The women at first throw the boy into the air, then he is handed to the men to throw him into the air to symbolize the boy belonging to the men from then on after. The boy learns to hunt larger animals that requires a tactful skill set that was not needed for smaller game. After some time, the boy's nasal septum was pierced and inserted with a bone by his father or grandfather to flatten his nose according to aesthetics.

Likewise, girls' symbol of coming of age was a nose piercing, but was done by her husband after marriage.Culturally, the piercings signified the social status of the individual and their right to access other ceremonies. For women, it displayed their ability to acquire a husband. For the husband, it displayed his ownership and right to his wife. For men, it presented the boy now as a man and his place is society with men. He no longer belonged to the children and the women who raised him. In addition, he now had the right to ceremonies such as circumcision, subincision and an elevated position in society.

=== Risks ===
The septum or nasal septum is the cartilaginous wall that separates the two nostrils. The cartilage is generally not penetrated. It is the slim segment of extremely delicate and adaptable skin, just between the cartilage and the lower part of the nose, where the septum is generally pierced. Puncturing the skin rather than the cartilage can extraordinarily limit the aggravation, as well as different inconveniences related with this sort of piercing. This piercing ought to be done exclusively with a needle. Taking everything into account, captive bead rings, circular barbells, plugs, tusks, twists, and septum retainers can be utilized. Risk of bacterial contamination is additionally present in pools, waterways and showers.

All types of body piercings, including septum piercings, are associated with the risk of contracting certain blood borne diseases, like hepatitis, from the needles and piercing guns used in the procedure. This risk can be reduced by getting the piercing done by a reputable piercer and making sure that the piercer uses only sterile single-use needles. The next most common risk associated with almost all types of piercing is the risk of infection and pain. These issues can be minimized greatly if piercing is done on the soft and flexible skin that lies between the cartilage and bottom of the nose. As far as infection risks are concerned, they can be managed with proper piercing aftercare.

This piercing can sometimes lead to septal hematoma, an injury to the soft tissue within the septum that can disrupt the blood vessels to cause the accumulation of blood and fluid under the lining. Nasal septum hematoma can eventually cause nasal congestion and interfere with breathing along with causing pain and inflammation. If not treated immediately, the condition can ultimately cause formation of a hole in the septum, leading to nasal congestion. Sometimes, that part of the nose may collapse, resulting in a cosmetic deformity, known as saddle nose.

== Bridge piercing ==
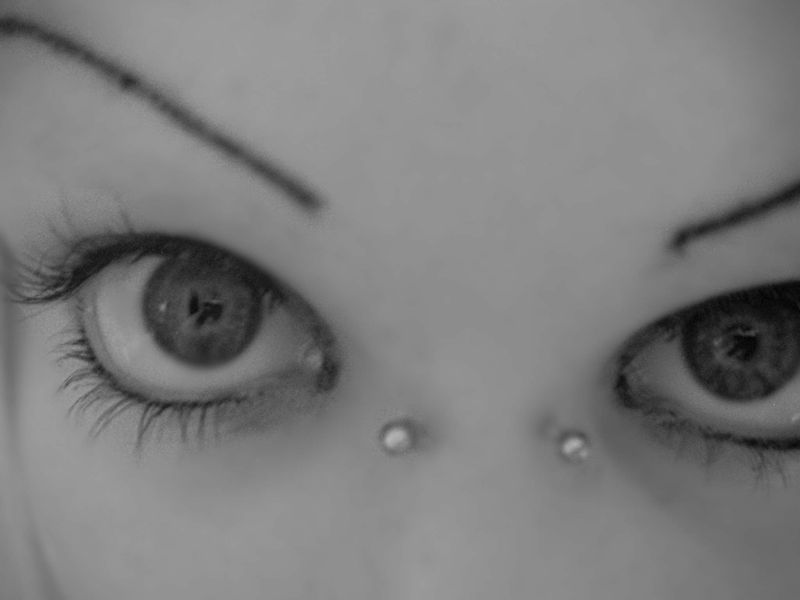
Bridge piercing

Bridge piercings are inserted through the skin at the top of the nose, between the eyes. Curved barbells and straight barbells are the most commonly used in this piercing, while seamless and captive rings are not recommended. Getting a bridge piercing done is somewhat riskier than other nose piercings. Like other surface piercings, the jewelry may migrate or cause scarring if not taken care of correctly. Bridge piercings require very specific anatomy, careful maintenance, and often many jewelry changes. A bridge piercing is pierced through the loose skin at the bridge of the nose. It is often pierced with a 14-gauge needle, depending on the preference of the piercer and the client's anatomy.

=== Rhino piercing ===
Rhino piercings are inserted through the tip of the nose. This piercing gives the look of the horn on a rhinoceros. Rhino piercings are distinct from other nose piercings because they are placed through the tip of the nose instead of on the sides or middle of the nose. Due to the fact that this piercing is inserted through the nose's cartilage, it can take up to a full year for the piercing to completely heal. The rhino piercing is usually a safe procedure to perform as long as the nose is properly cleaned and sanitized.

== See also ==
- Nose ring (animals)
