= Cattle chute =

Livestock herding device

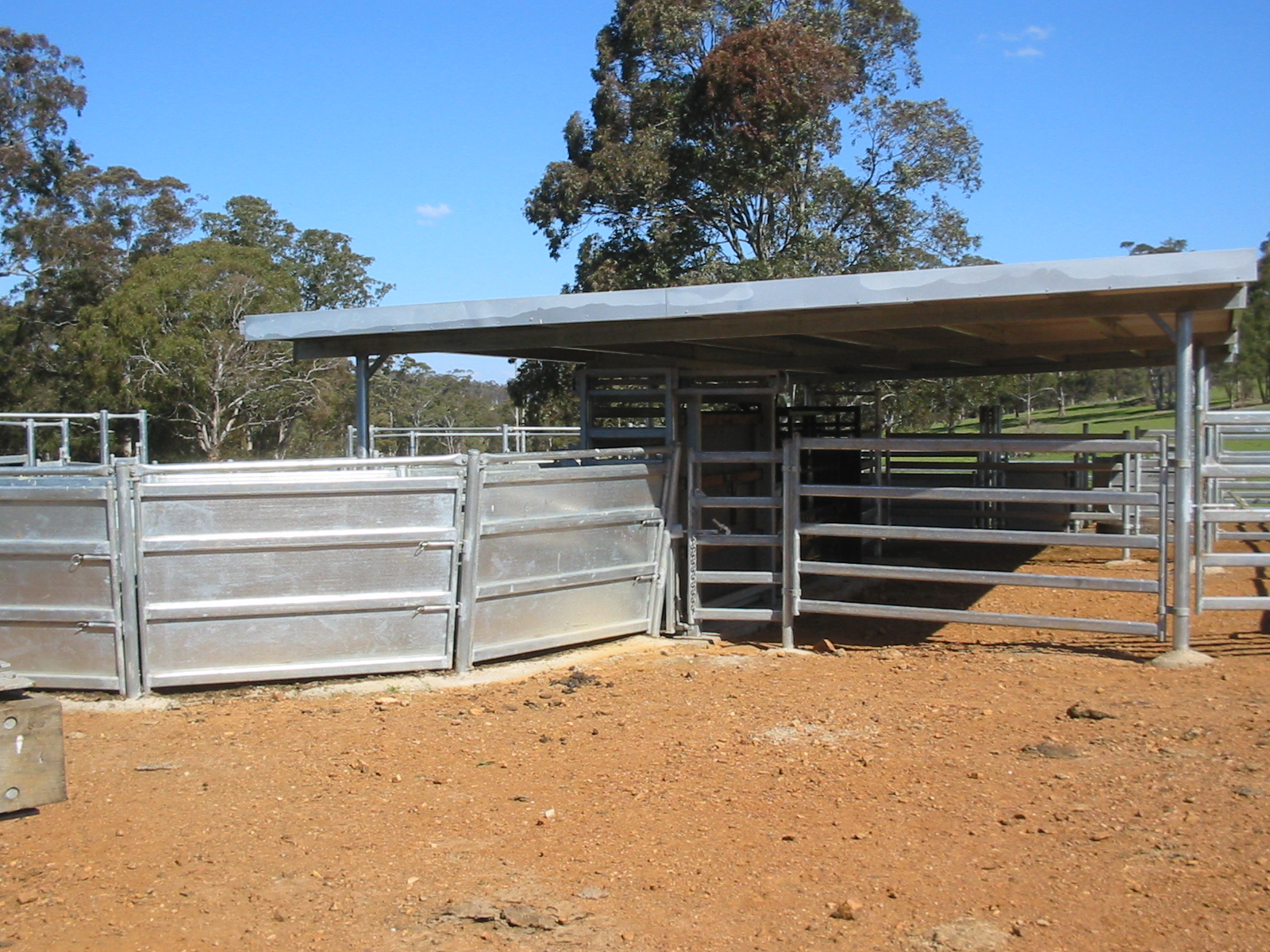
A curved "V" (tapered) race or alley leading to a covered crush

A cattle chute (North America) or cattle race (Australia, British Isles and New Zealand) also called a run or alley, is a narrow corridor built for cattle that separates them from the rest of the herd and allows handlers and veterinarians to provide medical care or restrain the animal for other procedures. A conventional cattle chute consists of parallel panels or fences with a space between them that is slightly wider than one animal so they are unable to turn around. Cattle chutes gently restrain the animal using a squeeze mechanism. The chute is connected to an alley, forming the animals into a queue that only allows them to go forward. Cattle tubs or a BudBox can also be used to help with animal flow and maintain low-stress cattle handling principles. It is used for routine husbandry activities such as drafting (sorting) or loading animals via ramp or loading chute into a vehicle; placing them one at a time in a cattle crush (variations also called a squeeze chute or standing stock) for examination, marking or veterinary treatment. They are also used at packing plants to move animals into a crush designed for slaughter.

== Overview ==
An experimental humane design of cattle handling system, by Temple Grandin, gradually narrows so that cattle have ample time to form the queue, and curves to encourage cattle to move forward in a controlled manner (see photo). It uses the principles of animal science research and animal behavior to encourage cattle flow.

Calves (and other smaller animals such as sheep) can turn around in an adult cattle handling system, so a narrower race is required for proper handling. Thus the width of some cattle chutes are adjustable to accommodate different sized animals.

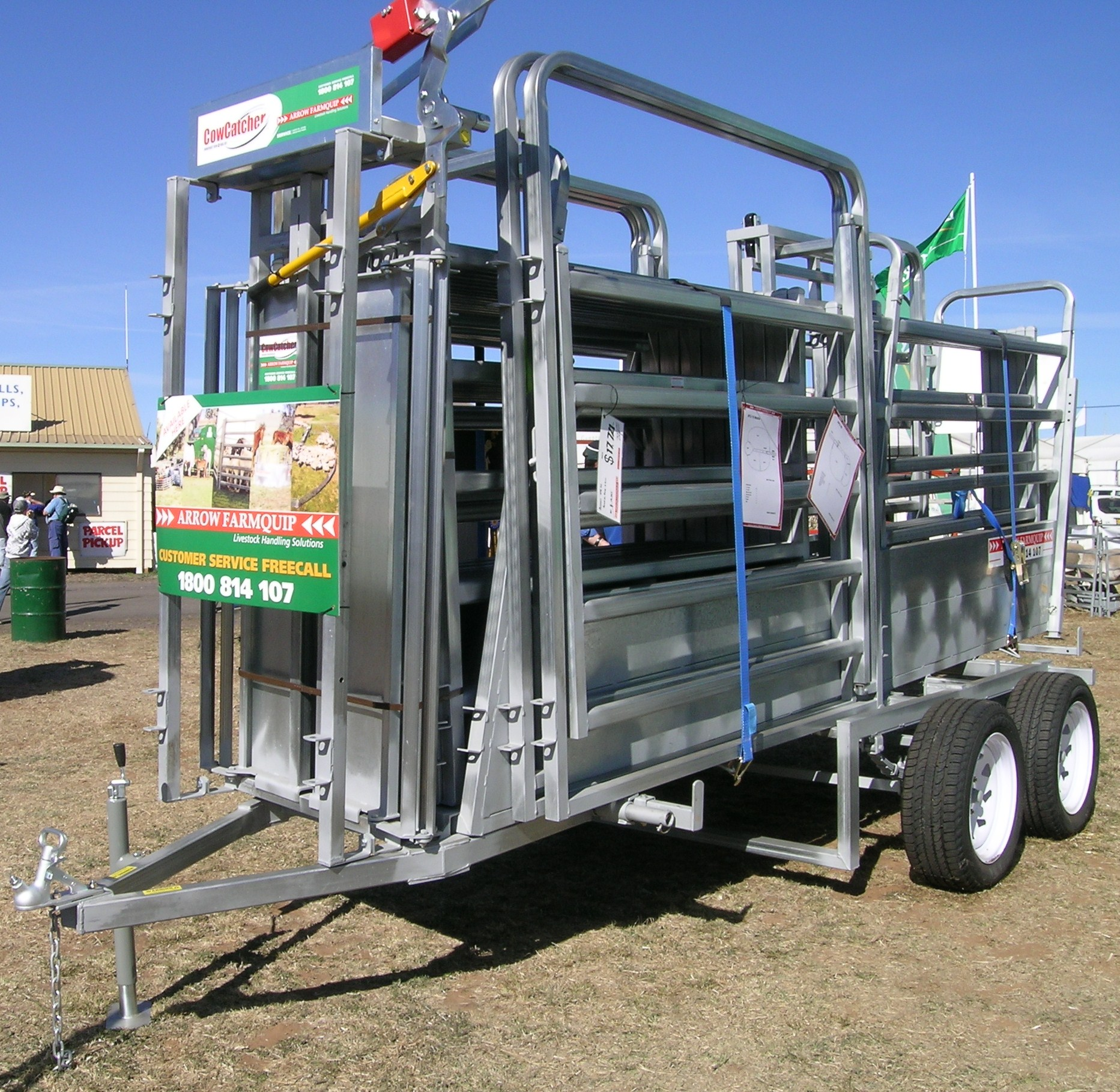
Portable cattle yards including a head gate, Gunnedah, New South Wales

Cattle chutes may be portable, or may be a permanent fixture with a concrete walkway. There are manual and hydraulic options. Portable chutes may be made of steel, iron or aluminum; but modern permanent ones are usually of steel or iron (sometimes timber or even concrete) which is usually set in concrete, with solid or railed sides and a non-slip floor. Anti-bruise chutes do not have sharp edges, and instead use pipe with rounded edges such as oval rails; alternatively sides with sheet iron or steel can be found or built onto the chutes, which improves livestock movement and also prevents injuries from animals getting their legs or heads caught between the rails. Cattle chutes that have concrete floors have the flooring made wider than the race itself to prevent hooves catching between the bottom rail and the edge of the concrete. The concrete is also not smooth like that on city sidewalks but roughed out to give the animals more traction to prevent slipping and injury. Lower parts of the chute have removable side panels for access points and in the event of an animal becoming cast (stuck after falling down) or caught up in which the animal is needed to be freed to prevent injury. Some cattle chutes also have veterinarian access, allowing safe inspection for the veterinarian.

The length of the cattle chute is usually determined by the size of the herd – a longer one requires less penning-up of a larger herd. Longer cattle chutes with alleys may be curved, to improve the movement and forward flow of the animals towards the chute. However alleys longer than 24 feet (7.3 m) tend to cause trouble with the flow of the animals into the loading or cattle chute. A walkway may be provided on the outside of the alleys and chute, on one or both sides, to allow handlers easier handling, examination or treatment of animals from above, while adhering to the best practices of livestock handling outlined in low-stress cattle handling principles and through the research of Temple Grandin.

There are gates at the start and end of the race to regulate the movement of animals. The entrance is from a small funnel-shaped or semi-circular holding pen (or crowding tub or BudBox), where a gate is used to move cattle into the chute. Hybrid versions of this model are also available, and prevent cattle from turning around in the box. The gates are usually arranged so the cattle handler cannot become trapped or injured by the cattle. Most systems allow extra gates to be added so the system can be adapted too. This is achieved in several ways:

- using a sliding gate operated from outside the alleys and chute, commonly found between the exit of the crowding tub and the entrance to the chute, in the middle of the alley itself, or at the end of the alley in entrance to the chute;
- unlatching exit gates by a remotely operated cord;
- or for a holding pen gate which uses a self-locking brake-latch that will lock if animals move back on it but be pushed forward by the handler. A latch is pulled back to unlock the gate so that it can open to another batch of livestock waiting to be moved in behind the previous batch. This holding pen gate can swing at an angle of 180° to 300°. Newer models can swing to 360°.

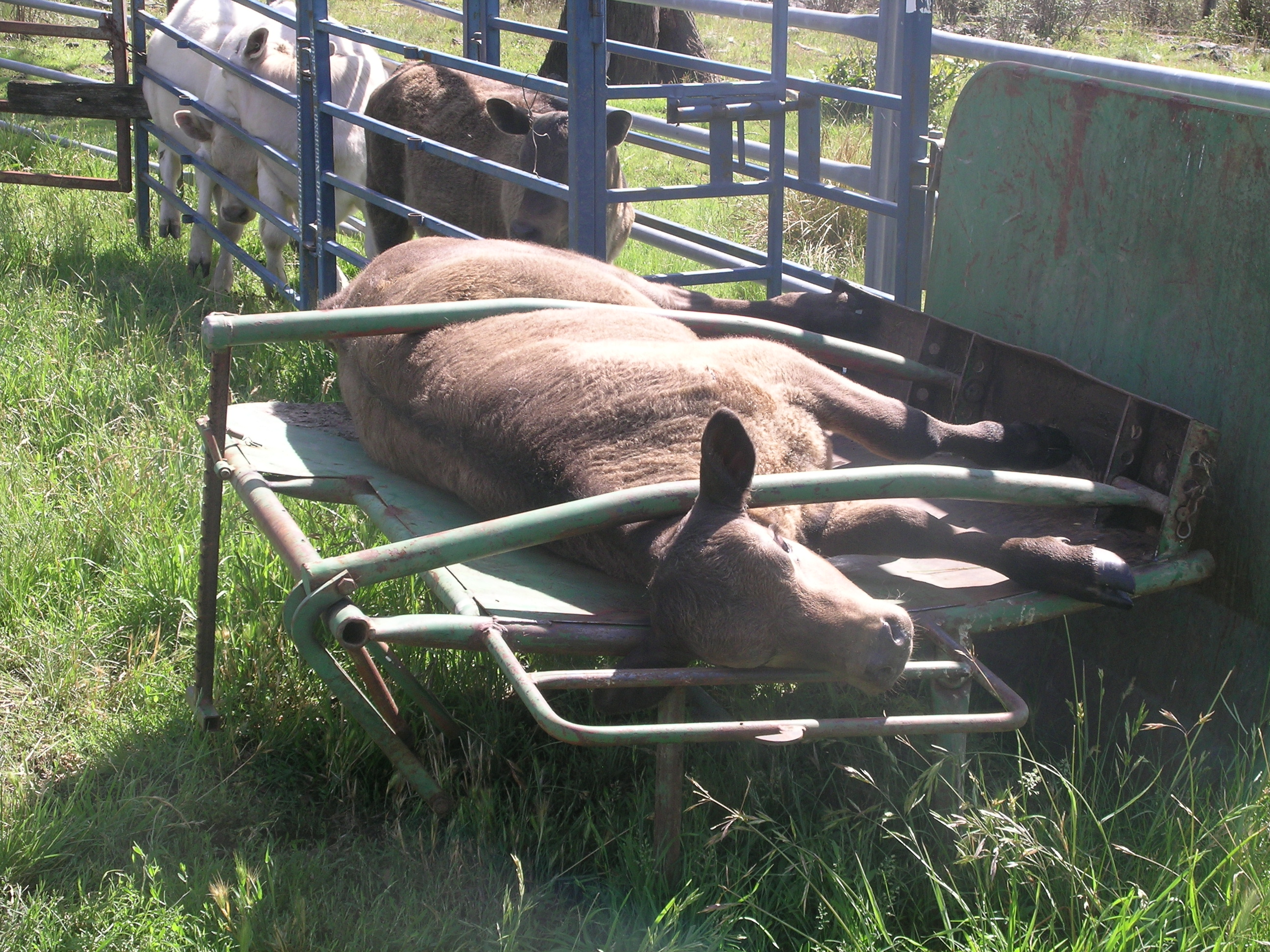
A calf race leading to a calf cradle

The exit from the chute may be through a head gate, which swings or slides to open one or another of several exits for separating animals into various groups.

== Calf chute or race/cradle ==
A calf race and cradle, or chute in North America, makes calf branding and castration much quicker and cleaner. The calf is forced into a chute or crush, like that of a normal chute or crush, except it is pushed to one side and cradled in place by steel bars. Note that the bars are nowhere near the belly region of the calf, only located on the neck and in front of the stifle. Then one side of the crush is tipped 90°, exposing the side of the calf to be branded or examined. Calf cradles are available in temporary or permanent styles like that described above. The steel transportable race and table cradle, as shown in the photo, are very popular in Australia and New Zealand, but are also found in North America. Full-size versions are also used in North America for safely trimming hooves on cattle.
