= Bulak =

A bulak or bulaki is an ornament or jewellery item that is a part of traditional attire of women in Northern India and Nepal.

== Design ==
Bulak is a type of nose ring worn at the nasal septum. It is usually worn by married women and is generally made out of 10-12 gram pure gold. It is peculiarly designed by the skillful goldsmiths who carve intricate motif designs on it. The average length of a bulak can be up to 4–5 cm along with a hook-like end, so that it could be worn easily. The bottom part of a bulak has intricate carving on it and the pearls are in a conical shape giving it an elegant look. The hook at which the bulaq is worn, resembles the inverted 'U' of the English alphabet.

Bulaks previously on display at the V&A museum.

== Other names for bulak ==
- Bulankh (in Garhwali and Himachali)
- Besar (in Kumaoni)
- Bulaki (in Nepali)

== Region ==
In former years, it was adorned by the women of Garhwal, Kumaon and of Jaunsar belt. But nowadays the trend for bulak is diminishing and considered an old fashion. Apart from Uttarakhand, it is also worn in the state of Himachal Pradesh and in Nepal.

== See also ==
- Nose piercing
- Nose ring
