= Nose ring (animal) =

For controlling bulls and weaning calves

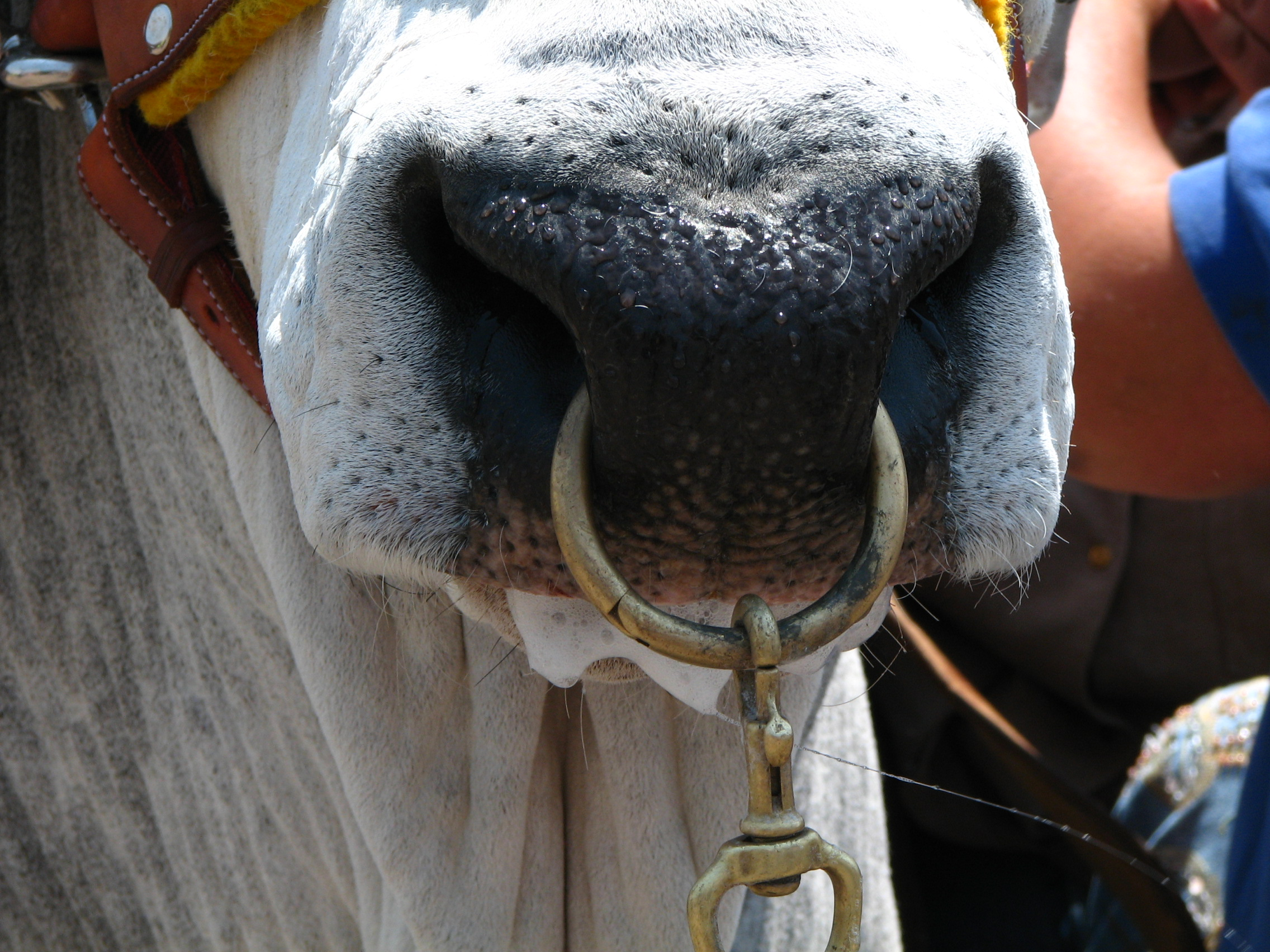
Nose ring on a bull

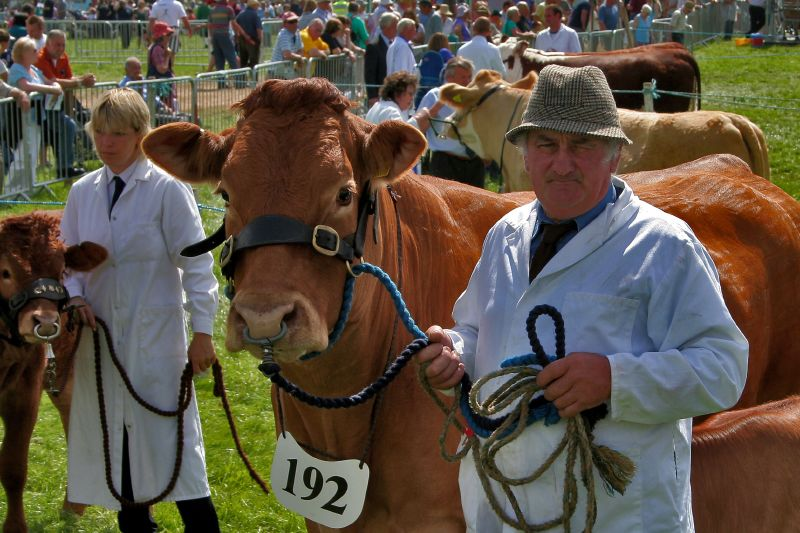
Nose rings in cattle at a show

A nose ring is inserted into the nose of an animal. Nose rings are used to control bulls and occasionally cows, and to help wean young cattle by preventing suckling. Nose rings are used on pigs to discourage rooting. Some nose rings are installed through a pierced hole in the nasal septum or rim of the nose and remain there, while others are temporary tools.

== History ==
Historically, the use of nose rings for controlling animals dates to the dawn of recorded human civilization. They were used in ancient Sumer and are seen on the Standard of Ur, where they were used on both bovines and equines. There are theories that the rod-and-ring symbol are a shepherd's crook and a nose rope.

== Calf-weaning nose ring ==
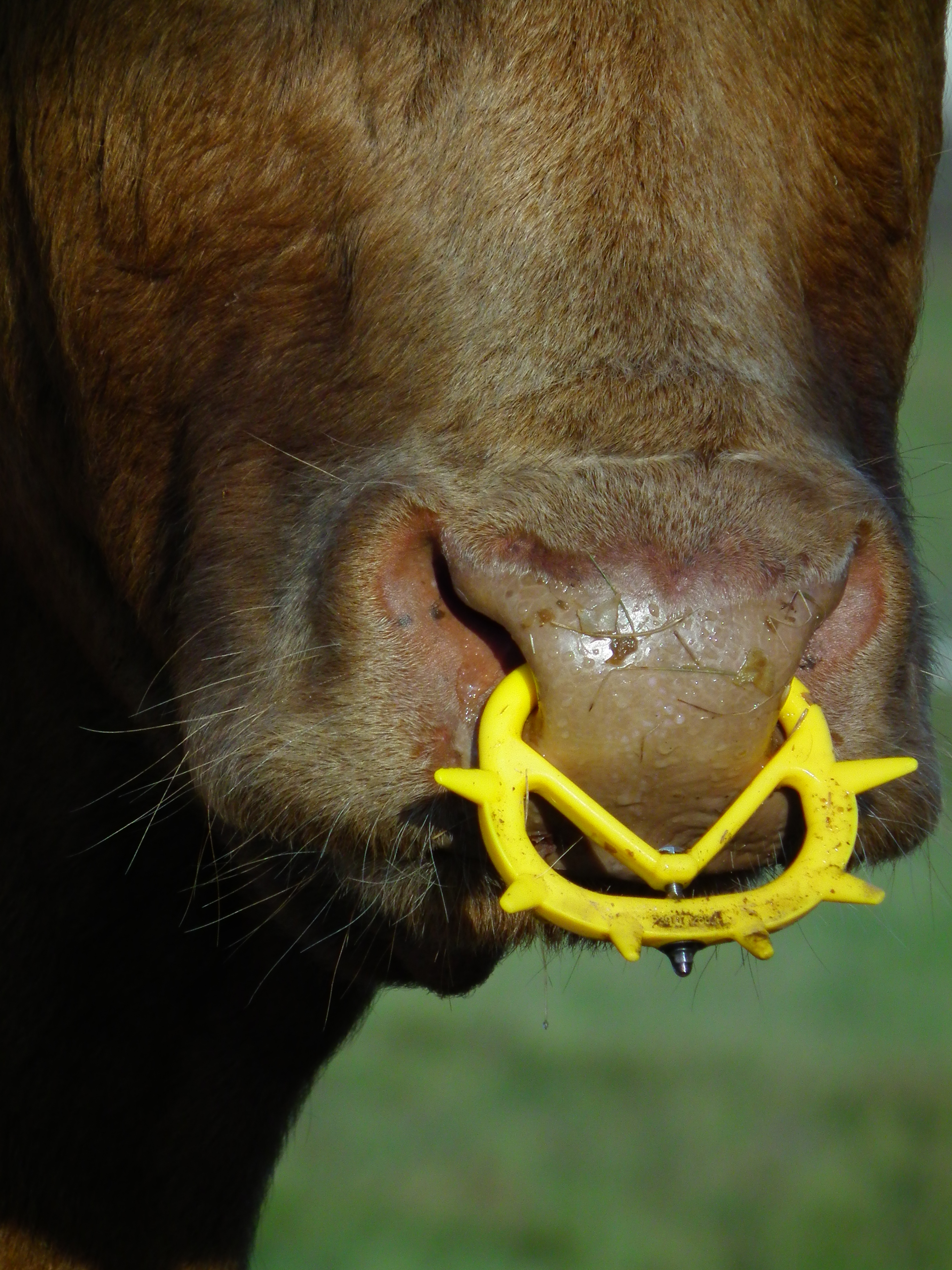
A calf-weaning ring prevents suckling

Calf-weaning nose rings, sometimes called weaners, are pain-based anti-suckling devices. These nose rings (usually made of plastic) clip onto the nose without piercing it, and are reusable. They provide an alternative to separating calves from their mothers during the weaning period. They have plastic spikes which are uncomfortable for the dam when her calf presses against her udder, causing her to reject the calf's efforts at suckling. Use of calf-weaning nose rings reduces the stress of weaning by separating it into two stages. First, the calf is weaned from suckling milk—this stage usually lasts up to 14 days. Then later the calf is separated from its dam. Weaning nose rings are also available for sheep and goats.

== Rings for adult cattle ==
The nose ring assists the handler to control a potentially dangerous animal with minimal risk of injury or disruption by exerting stress on one of the most sensitive parts of the animal, the nose. Bulls, especially, are powerful and sometimes unpredictable animals which, if uncontrolled, can kill or severely injure a human handler.

Control of the bull may be done by holding the ring by hand, attaching a lead rope to it, or clipping on a bull staff or bull pole. A rope or chain from the ring may be attached to a bull's horns or to a head-collar for additional control. A short length of chain or rope may be left hanging loose from the ring of an aggressive bull, so when he ducks in a threatening manner the bull will step on the chain and be deterred from attacking. This dangling lead may also facilitate capture and control of a frisky bull.

For safety reasons, many show societies require bulls over 10 months to be accompanied by two people, wear a halter and lead, and be led with a rope, chain, or bull pole attached to the bull's nose ring. Some shows require other cattle to be led with temporary rings, see nose tongs below.

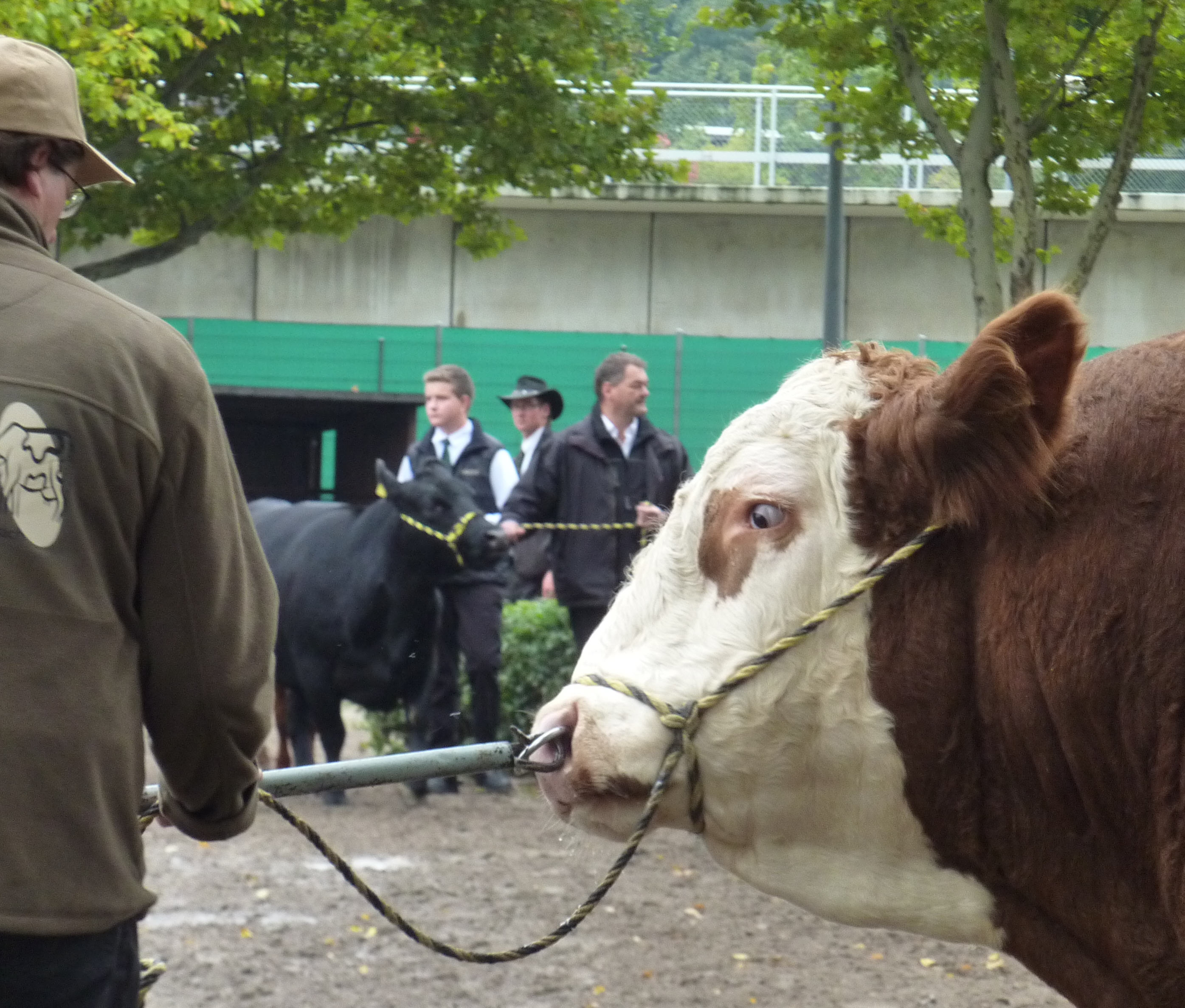
A bull staff hooked to a nose ring

A bull pole or bull staff is a wooden or metal pole with a special hook on the end that snaps onto the nose ring. The James Safety First Bull Staff (1919) was a five-foot-long steel tube with a lock hook on the bull's end operated from the handler's end of the pole. The pole is used to keep a distance between the handler and the bull, and can be used to push a bull out of a pen without requiring the handler to enter the pen for cleaning or feeding. There is some risk that a bull might drive the staff into the handler if the bull misbehaves. One veterinary text recommends the use of a bull staff in addition to the halter:

If you do choose to have a bull, be sure you are prepared to handle him properly. Many handlers rely on a nose ring to control a bull. But a ring in his nose is no good unless you have a bull staff and use it. A bull staff is a pole with a snap in the end that clips to the bull ring. Leading a bull with a staff gives you a lot more handling power as the bull can't get any closer to you than the length of the staff allows. Leading him only by a chain in the ring lets him run over you at will. Even with a staff, it's smart to never completely trust the ring; I have seen bulls rip rings out of their noses when they got angry enough.

Bull rings are usually 8 to 13 centimetres (3 to 5 inches) in diameter, depending on the size of the bull. Bull rings are commonly made from aluminium, stainless steel or copper, in the form of a pair of hinged semicircles, held closed by a small brass bolt whose head is broken off during installation. If a ring needs to be removed (for example, if the bull has grown out of it), it is cut or unscrewed.

The ring is normally placed on the bull between 9 and 12 months of age. It is usually done by a veterinarian, who pierces the septum with a scalpel or punch. Self-piercing rings (with sharp ends designed to be pressed through the septum and then pulled together with a screw) have been available for many years; these are also usually installed by a veterinarian rather than the owner.

== Nose tongs ==
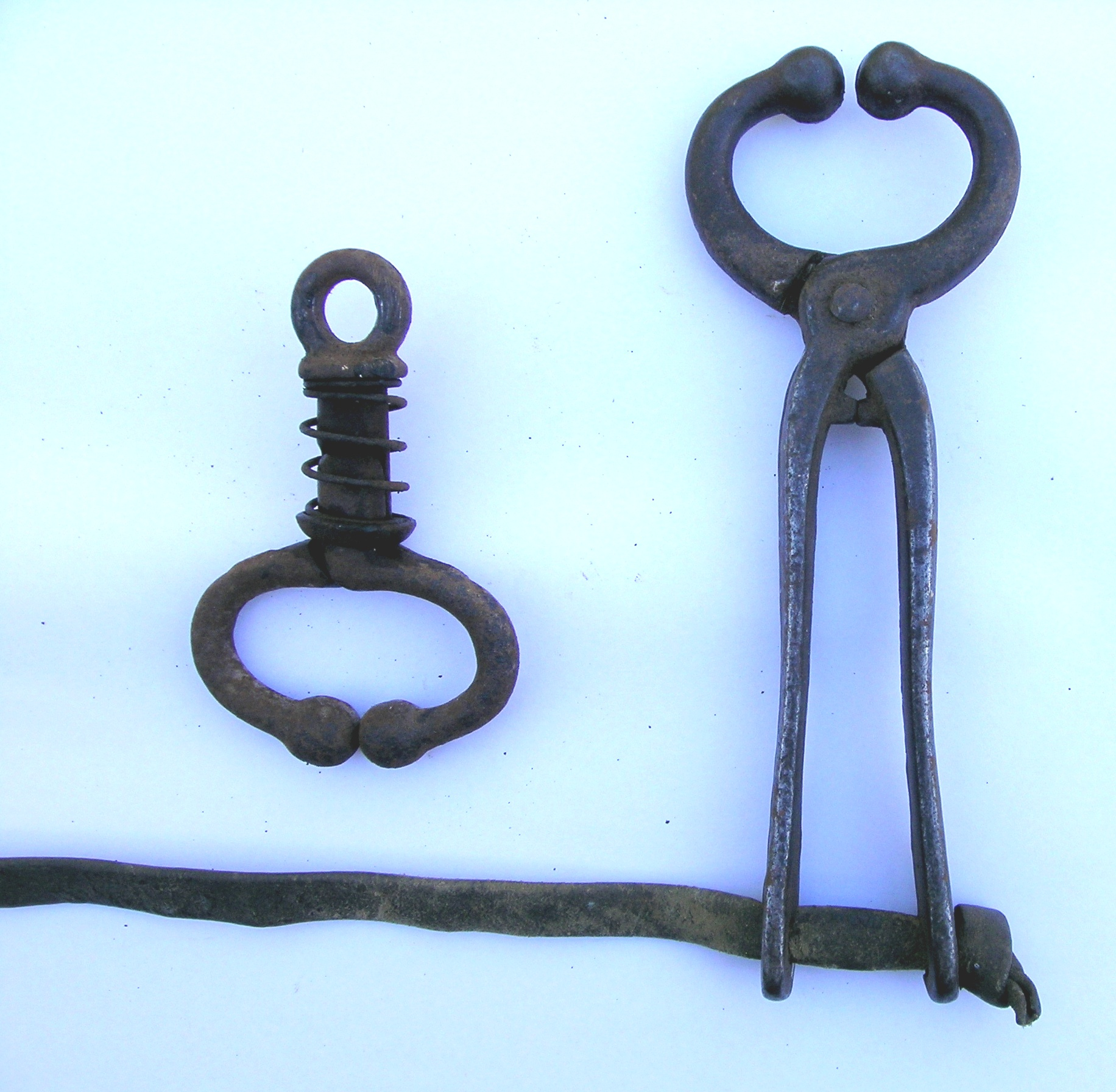
Bulldogs (left), bull tongs (right)

Another restraint method is tongs which temporarily grasp the septum. They are variously called nose clamps, nose tongs, dogs, bulldogs, bull tongs, or barnacles.

Self-locking or spring-closing show-lead nose rings, also called "bulldogs" or nose grips, are removable rings that do not require the nose to be pierced. They are often used on steers and cows, along with a halter, at agricultural shows, or when handling cattle for examination, marking or treatment. They stay shut until released, and usually have a loop for the attachment of a cord or lead rope. They give similar control to a bull ring without the need for permanent attachment.

Bull-holders, also known as bull-tongs, have a pliers action and are used for short periods on grown cattle when they are being mouthed or drenched. A chain, rope or strap keeps the grips closed and may be passed over a bar at the front of a head bail to elevate the head. The thumb and forefinger may also used in this way on smaller animals.

== Pig nose rings ==
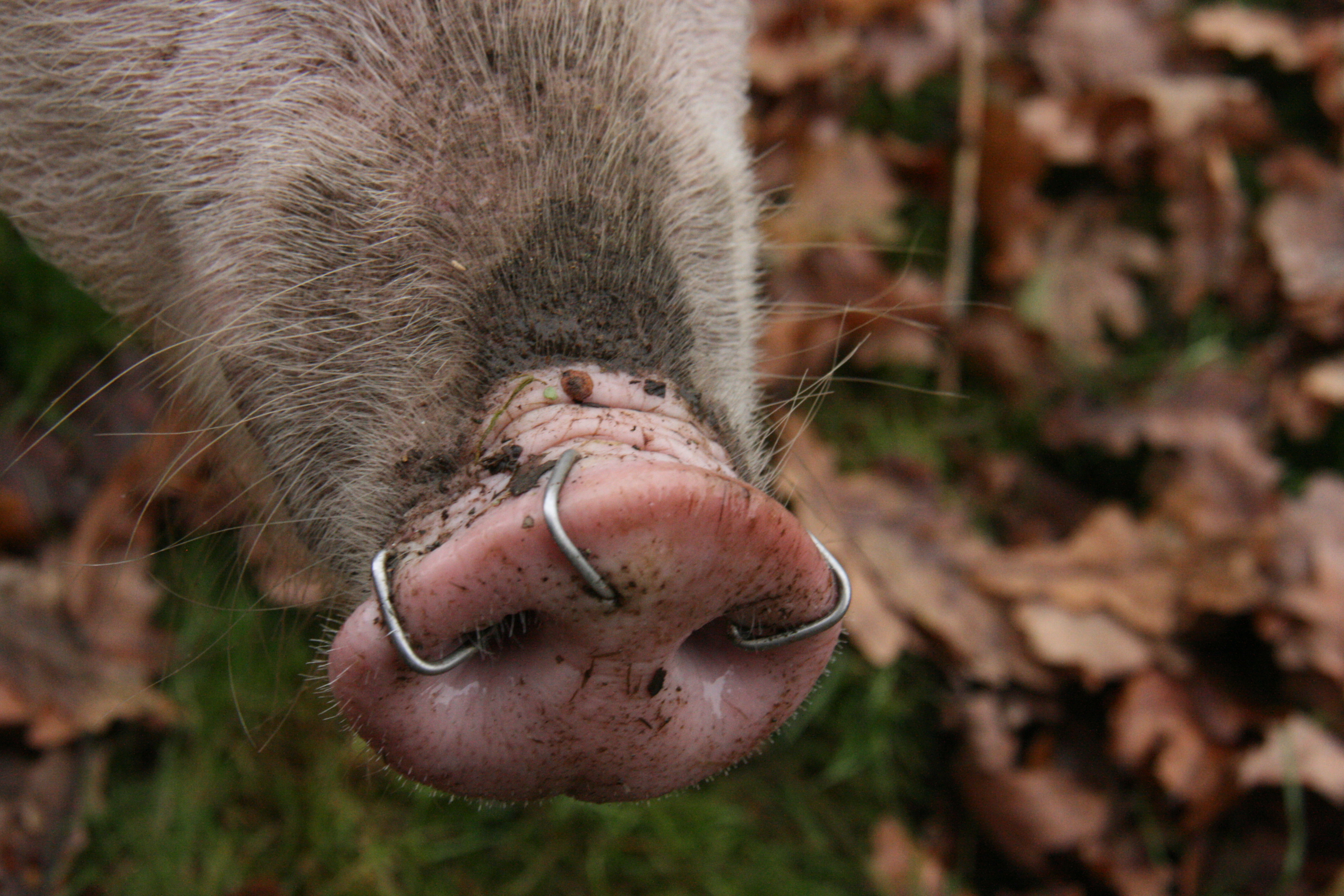
Nose rings on a pig

Rooting is the act of a pig nudging into something with its snout, such as into the dirt to unearth plants to eat. In some circumstances, owners of pigs may find this undesirable. Nose rings make rooting painful for the animal, although a ringed pig may still be able to forage freely through leaf litter and surface vegetation. Pig nose-ringing may sometimes be required by local regulations, as when farm pigs are released into public woods to pannage (such as on the New Forest in southern England).

Nose rings specifically designed for pigs usually consist of open copper or steel wire rings with sharp ends, about 25 mm (1 in) in diameter. These are typically clipped to the rim of the nose instead of through the septum, as this is far more painful to the pig and is considered "thus more effective for deterring the pig from rooting than piercing through the septum is". As they may sometimes become dislodged, an adult pig may be given three to four rings.

== See also ==
- Bull § Handling
- Animal husbandry
