= Cattle age determination =

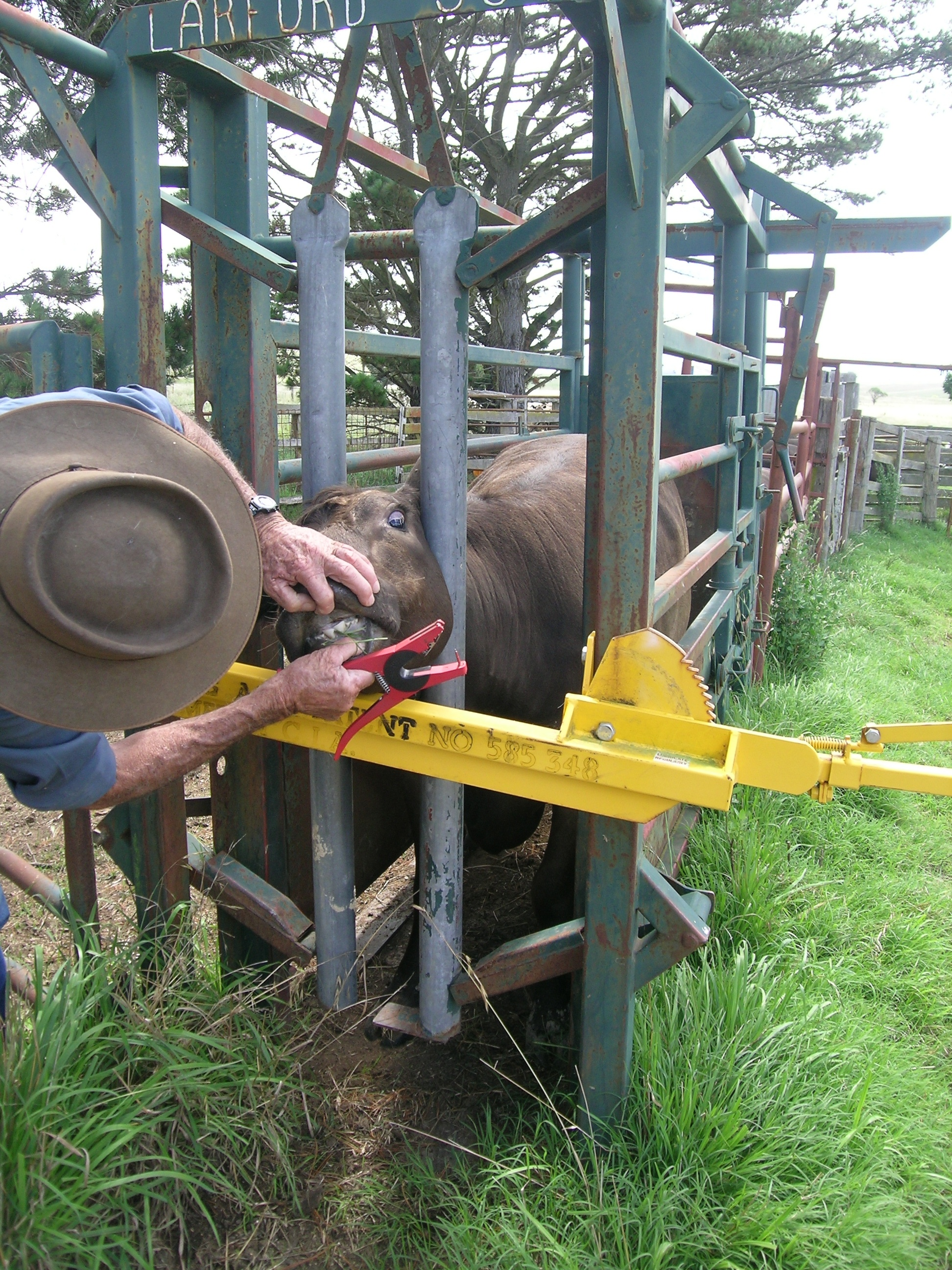
Mouthing a two tooth grass-fed Murray Grey heifer prior to sale

The age of cattle is determined chiefly by examination of the teeth, and less perfectly by the horn rings or the length of the tail brush; due to bang-tailing, which is the act of cutting the long hairs at the tip of the tail short to identify the animal after management practices, the last method is the least reliable.

This determination is less relevant in late 20th-century and 21st-century cattle-raising, as ear tags are applied to cattle nearly from birth and upon sale which allows a check of records of when precisely a particular cattle was born, traded, their medical history, and so on. A check of the dentition can still be helpful for when trading with unmarked cattle raised in more traditional systems, or when a cattle buyer wishes to verify a seller's records as accurate.

== Teeth method ==
Cattle are placed in a cattle crush in order to restrain them prior inspecting the mouth and amount of teeth that each animal has.

The temporary teeth are in part erupted at birth, and all the incisors are erupted in twenty days; the first, second and third pairs of temporary molars are erupted in thirty days; the teeth have grown large enough to touch each other by the sixth month. Temporary incisors or "milk" teeth are smaller than the permanent incisors.

Cattle have thirty-two teeth, including six incisors or biting teeth and two canines in the front on the bottom jaw. The canine teeth are not pointed but look like incisors. The incisor teeth meet with the thick hard dental pad of the upper jaw. Cattle have six premolars and six molars on both top and bottom jaws for a total of twenty-four molars. The teeth of cattle are suited primarily for grinding, and they use their rough tongues to grasp grass and then nip it off between their incisors and the dental pad.

There is controversy on the reliability of attempting to tell the age of cattle by their teeth, as rate of wear can be affected by the forage that is grazed. Drought or grazing on sandy country will also affect rate of wear.

The following is a guide:

- 12 months – All the calf teeth are in place.
- 15 months – Centre permanent incisors appear.
- 18 months – Centre permanent incisors showing some wear.
- 24 months – First intermediates up.
- 30 months – Six broad incisors up.
- 36 months – Six broad incisors showing wear.
- 39 months – Corner teeth up
- 42 months – Eight broad incisors showing wear.

The development is quite complete at from five to six years. At that time the border of the incisors has been worn away a little below the level of the grinders. At six years, the first grinders are beginning to wear, and are on a level with the incisors. At eight years, the wear of the first grinders is very apparent. At ten or eleven years, used surfaces of the teeth begin to bear a square mark surrounded by a white line, and this is pronounced on all the teeth by the twelfth year; between the twelfth and the fourteenth year this mark takes a round form.

It is a requirement in some locations that prime cattle have a dentition indication mark on them prior to auction. This is normally done by the vendor, or the stock agent. Fat cattle auctions in New South Wales, Australia identify the amount of teeth that prime animals have in the form of sprayed marks along the back. Thus two tooth cattle are marked on the wither, four tooth on the middle of the back and six tooth on their high bone (near tail). Milk and eight tooth cattle are not marked.

== Horn method ==
The rings on the horns are less useful as guides. At ten or twelve months the first ring appears; at twenty months to two years the second; at thirty to thirty-two months the third ring, at forty to forty-six months the fourth ring, at fifty four to sixty months the fifth ring, and so on. But, at the fifth year, the three first rings are indistinguishable, and at the eighth year all the rings.

== Tail brush method ==
The brush of the tail is only useful as a guide when assessing small, stunted or young cattle. A brush that is about fetlock length or longer is an indication that the beast is twelve months old or older. This method cannot be used on cattle which have been bang-tailed. Bang tailing is the act of cutting the long hairs at the tip of the tail short to act as a simple identifier of animals and is commonly used after a procedure has been performed on an individual animal that belongs to a large mob e.g. the mob is run through a race and each animal is vaccinated – immediately after being vaccinated the animal is bang-tailed so they are identified as vaccinated and will not be given a second dose of vaccine. This is useful when large numbers of animals are being processed by a group of individuals.

== Other methods ==
Cattle age in a carcass is determined checking the physiological skeletal maturity (ossification) (red) of the tips or "buttons" of the thoracic vertebrae. The size and shape of the rib bones are important considerations as well as the colour and texture of the flesh.

== Record keeping ==
Cattle are tracked in a number of ways. A cattle raised on a farm as a calf can have their age tracked directly. One technique used for a time were brands and/or tattoos with numbers or different colours to mark the cohort a calf or bought cattle is in. 21st century livestock raising is more likely to use RFID tags and ear tags which can serve as both a visual and electronic marker of identity. These records can then be bundled with a sale.
