= Nose-jewel =

Jewelry worn on or through the nose

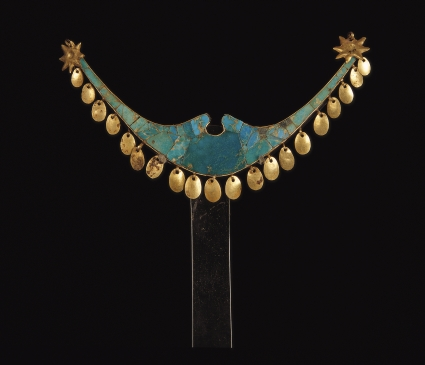
Turquoise gold nose ornament from the Moche culture.

These nose piercing ornaments are attached through a piercing in the nostril or septum.

== Middle East and North Africa ==
Earliest known reference to nose ornament comes from the Middle East dating back to 4,000 years ago. In the book of Genesis, Abraham’s servant gifts young Rebekah an array of jewellery as a marriage offering on behalf of her future husband, Isaac. Among the gifts and trinkets was a golden ring called a “Shanf” also known as a nose ring. Ezekiel 16:11-14 refers to personification of Jerusalem as a woman who was given a golden crown, earrings and a nose ring by the God; "And I put a ring on your nose and earrings in your ears and a beautiful crown on your head. Thus you were adorned with gold and silver, and your clothing was of fine linen and embroidered cloth.".

In ancient Carthage, septum piercings were worn by both Carthaginian men and women. These were commonly made of gold, some examples in silver are also known.

== Americas ==
In Americas, nose piercing can be dated through pre-Columbian and colonial times throughout North and South America. Numerous status ceremonies are carved into the North Temple of the Great Ballcourt at Chichin Itza. One of these processions is a nose piercing ceremony that is depicted on the North Temple vault. Rather than depicting sacrifice, the common theme of the temple's carvings, the central figure is shown aiming what most likely is a bone awl to pierce the figure's nose. The ritual of the nostril piercing signified the elevated status of this figure. His place in society is symbolized by his nose piercing. Similarly, nose piercing signified elevated status in Colonial Highland Maya. The two prominent lords, Ajpop and the Ajpop K'ama, of the K'iche were pierced through the nose at the pinnacle of an elaborate ceremony. Similar to a crowning of a king, the nose piercing was to show their newfound leadership of the K'iche.

In Yucatán, explorers Oviedo y Valdes, Herrera y Tordesillas, Diego de Landa, and Jeronimo de Aguilar all noted different nose piercings that they observed in Mayans and other cultures in Yucatán in general. They reported that different stones could have different meaning within each civilization. In addition, they believed the different placement and size and shape of beads could denote the specific society the person came from. The Toltecs were believed to have piercings through the ala of the nose that was adorned with a bead. While the Mayans pierced through the septum and consisted of an oblong bead rather than a spherical.

== South Asia ==
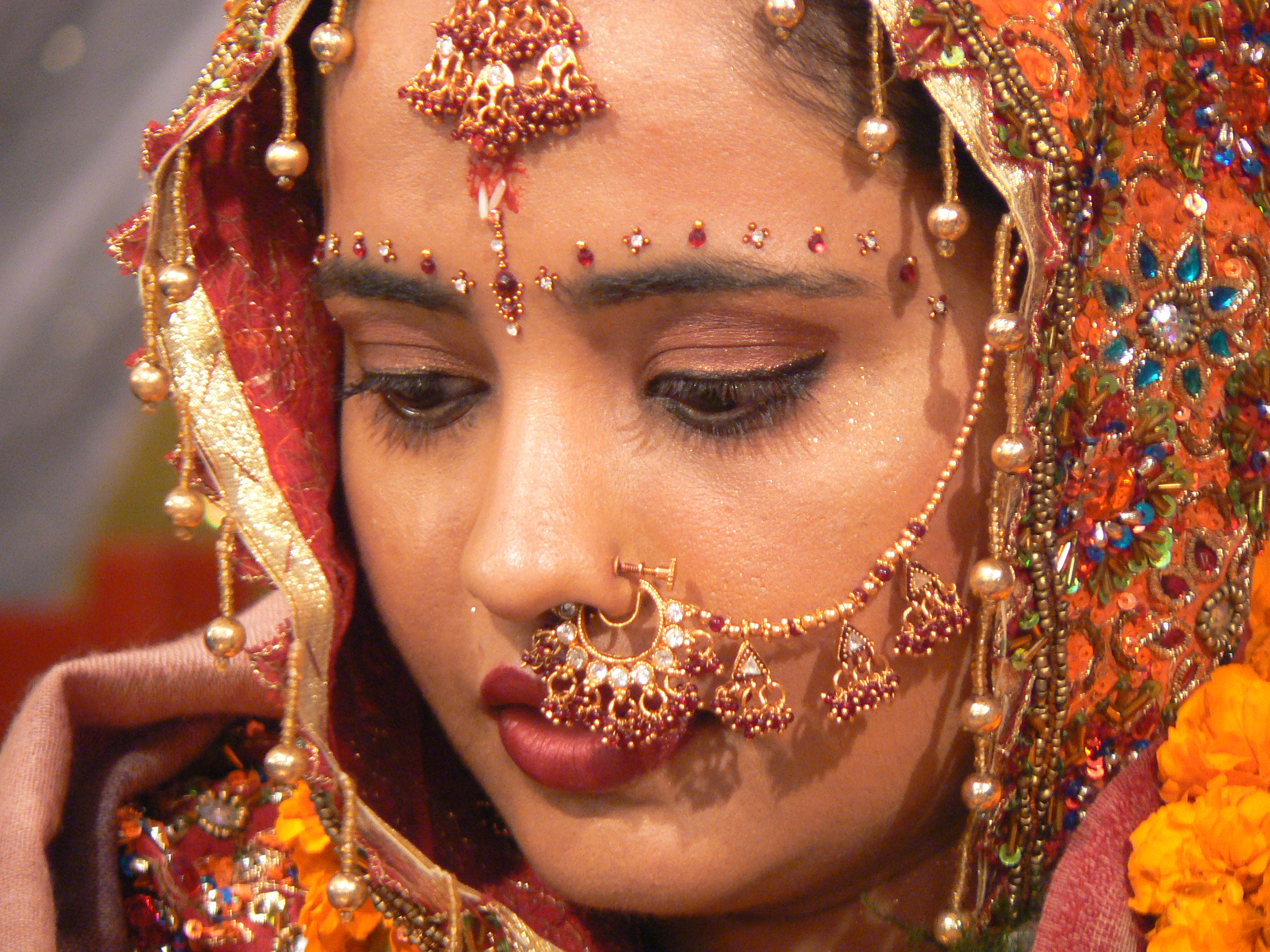
A Hindu bride wearing the Nath.

The nose ring is called a Nath (Hindi: नथ, IPA: [nətʰ]) in various local languages and was introduced around the 9th and 10th centuries becoming a symbol of a woman's marital status. The nath in its full form contains a jeweled ring with a chain connected to a hairpiece.

In South Asia, nose piercings were introduced as early as the 10th century, and by the 15th century they were common across South Asia. Historian A.S Altekar suggests nose piercings do not find mention in Indian literature before the 8th century and were likely introduced after this period. According to historian Benoytosh Bhattacharya, the 12th-century text Manasollasa mentions various ornaments worn by women but does not mention nose ring, and was likely introduced by Mohammadans after the 12th century. Jewelry historian Oppi Untracht suggests nose piercings were introduced during the 13th century by Muslims and was quickly established over the years.

The "nath" (nose jewel) displays the economic status of the wearer; made of pearls, sapphire and various gems set in gold while others wore those made of silver from the 15th century onwards. The ornament became quite popular during the 17th and 18th centuries. British Museum contains large collection of golden nose ring jewels from various parts of India, Nepal and Pakistan donated by researcher Dr. Waltraud Ganguly.

== See also ==
- Nose piercing
