= Villar de Corneja =

- municipality
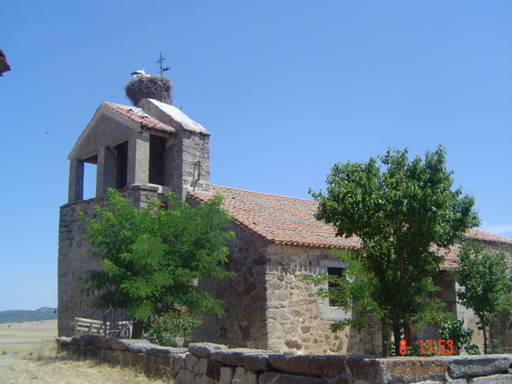
- Parish church of Villar de Corneja
- Flag Coat of arms
- Location in Spain. Villar de Corneja (Spain)
- Coordinates: 40°28′31″N 5°25′45″W
- Country: Spain
- Autonomous community: Castile and León
- Province: Ávila
- Municipality: Villar de Corneja

Area
  - Total: 7 km^{2} (2.7 sq mi)
- Elevation: 1,001 m (3,284 ft)

Population (2025-01-01)
  - Total: 31
  - Density: 4.4/km^{2} (11/sq mi)
- Time zone: UTC+1 (CET)
  - Summer (DST): UTC+2 (CEST)
- Website: Official website

Villar de Corneja is a municipality located in the province of Ávila, Castile and León, Spain.

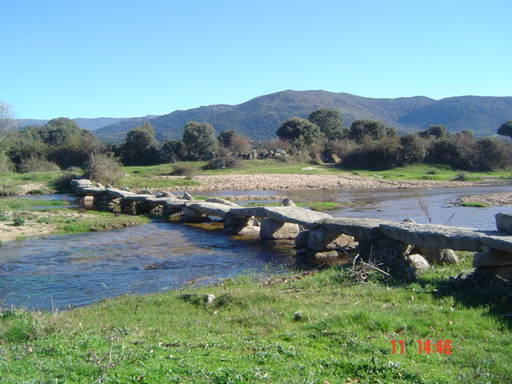
'La Fonseca' Roman bridge over Cornera River.

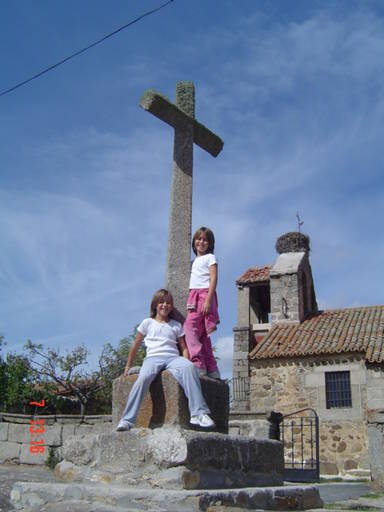
The ancient cross and the church.

== Population ==
Historical population
Year	Pop.	±% p.a.
2023	37	—
2024	36	−2.70%
2025	31	−13.89%
Source: INE
