= List of MeSH codes (C08) =

The following is a partial list of the "C" codes for Medical Subject Headings (MeSH), as defined by the United States National Library of Medicine (NLM).

This list continues the information at List of MeSH codes (C07). Codes following these are found at List of MeSH codes (C09). For other MeSH codes, see List of MeSH codes.

The source for this content is the set of 2006 MeSH Trees from the NLM.

== MeSH C08 – respiratory tract diseases ==
=== MeSH C08.127 – bronchial diseases ===
==== MeSH C08.127.108 – asthma ====
- MeSH C08.127.108.110 – asthma, exercise-induced
- MeSH C08.127.108.880 – status asthmaticus

==== MeSH C08.127.384 – bronchiectasis ====
- MeSH C08.127.384.500 – kartagener syndrome

==== MeSH C08.127.446 – bronchitis ====
- MeSH C08.127.446.135 – bronchiolitis
- MeSH C08.127.446.135.140 – bronchiolitis obliterans
- MeSH C08.127.446.135.140.200 – bronchiolitis obliterans organizing pneumonia
- MeSH C08.127.446.135.321 – bronchiolitis, viral
- MeSH C08.127.446.567 – bronchitis, chronic

=== MeSH C08.360 – laryngeal diseases ===
==== MeSH C08.360.535 – laryngitis ====
- MeSH C08.360.535.365 – croup

==== MeSH C08.360.940 – voice disorders ====
- MeSH C08.360.940.160 – aphonia
- MeSH C08.360.940.490 – hoarseness

=== MeSH C08.381 – lung diseases ===
==== MeSH C08.381.069 – atelectasis ====
- MeSH C08.381.069.542 – middle lobe syndrome

==== MeSH C08.381.423 – hypertension, pulmonary ====
- MeSH C08.381.423.694 – persistent fetal circulation syndrome

==== MeSH C08.381.472 – lung diseases, fungal ====
- MeSH C08.381.472.090 – aspergillosis, allergic bronchopulmonary
- MeSH C08.381.472.700 – pneumonia, pneumocystis

==== MeSH C08.381.483 – lung diseases, interstitial ====
- MeSH C08.381.483.125 – alveolitis, extrinsic allergic
- MeSH C08.381.483.125.125 – bird fancier's lung
- MeSH C08.381.483.125.365 – farmer's lung
- MeSH C08.381.483.187 – bronchiolitis obliterans
- MeSH C08.381.483.187.200 – bronchiolitis obliterans organizing pneumonia
- MeSH C08.381.483.250 – goodpasture syndrome
- MeSH C08.381.483.375 – histiocytosis, langerhans-cell
- MeSH C08.381.483.600 – pneumoconiosis
- MeSH C08.381.483.600.125 – asbestosis
- MeSH C08.381.483.600.225 – berylliosis
- MeSH C08.381.483.600.275 – byssinosis
- MeSH C08.381.483.600.300 – caplan's syndrome
- MeSH C08.381.483.600.750 – siderosis
- MeSH C08.381.483.600.760 – silicosis
- MeSH C08.381.483.600.760.125 – anthracosilicosis
- MeSH C08.381.483.600.760.750 – silicotuberculosis
- MeSH C08.381.483.620 – pulmonary fibrosis
- MeSH C08.381.483.675 – radiation pneumonitis
- MeSH C08.381.483.725 – sarcoidosis, pulmonary
- MeSH C08.381.483.950 – granulomatosis with polyangiitis

==== MeSH C08.381.495 – lung diseases, obstructive ====
- MeSH C08.381.495.108 – asthma
- MeSH C08.381.495.146 – bronchitis
- MeSH C08.381.495.146.135 – bronchiolitis
- MeSH C08.381.495.146.135.140 – bronchiolitis obliterans
- MeSH C08.381.495.146.135.140.200 – bronchiolitis obliterans organizing pneumonia
- MeSH C08.381.495.146.135.321 – bronchiolitis, viral
- MeSH C08.381.495.146.567 – bronchitis, chronic
- MeSH C08.381.495.389 – pulmonary disease, chronic obstructive
- MeSH C08.381.495.389.500 – bronchitis, chronic
- MeSH C08.381.495.389.750 – pulmonary emphysema
- MeSH C08.381.495.389.750.500 – lung, hyperlucent

==== MeSH C08.381.517 – lung diseases, parasitic ====
- MeSH C08.381.517.314 – echinococcosis, pulmonary

==== MeSH C08.381.540 – lung neoplasms ====
- MeSH C08.381.540.140 – carcinoma, bronchogenic
- MeSH C08.381.540.145 – carcinoma, non-small-cell lung
- MeSH C08.381.540.147 – carcinoma, small cell
- MeSH C08.381.540.150 – coin lesion, pulmonary
- MeSH C08.381.540.734 – pancoast's syndrome
- MeSH C08.381.540.867 – pulmonary sclerosing hemangioma

==== MeSH C08.381.677 – pneumonia ====
- MeSH C08.381.677.127 – bronchopneumonia
- MeSH C08.381.677.473 – pleuropneumonia
- MeSH C08.381.677.529 – pneumonia, aspiration
- MeSH C08.381.677.529.612 – pneumonia, lipid
- MeSH C08.381.677.540 – pneumonia, bacterial
- MeSH C08.381.677.540.500 – pneumonia, mycoplasma
- MeSH C08.381.677.540.530 – pneumonia of calves, enzootic
- MeSH C08.381.677.540.540 – pneumonia of swine, mycoplasmal
- MeSH C08.381.677.540.550 – pneumonia, pneumococcal
- MeSH C08.381.677.540.600 – pneumonia, rickettsial
- MeSH C08.381.677.540.620 – pneumonia, staphylococcal
- MeSH C08.381.677.675 – pneumonia, pneumocystis
- MeSH C08.381.677.807 – pneumonia, viral

==== MeSH C08.381.842 – respiratory distress syndrome, newborn ====
- MeSH C08.381.842.475 – hyaline membrane disease

==== MeSH C08.381.922 – tuberculosis, pulmonary ====
- MeSH C08.381.922.669 – silicotuberculosis

=== MeSH C08.460 – nose diseases ===
==== MeSH C08.460.669 – nose neoplasms ====
- MeSH C08.460.669.693 – paranasal sinus neoplasms
- MeSH C08.460.669.693.575 – maxillary sinus neoplasms

==== MeSH C08.460.692 – paranasal sinus diseases ====
- MeSH C08.460.692.503 – paranasal sinus neoplasms
- MeSH C08.460.692.503.503 – maxillary sinus neoplasms
- MeSH C08.460.692.752 – sinusitis
- MeSH C08.460.692.752.267 – ethmoid sinusitis
- MeSH C08.460.692.752.387 – frontal sinusitis
- MeSH C08.460.692.752.578 – maxillary sinusitis
- MeSH C08.460.692.752.827 – sphenoid sinusitis

==== MeSH C08.460.799 – rhinitis ====
- MeSH C08.460.799.631 – rhinitis, allergic, perennial
- MeSH C08.460.799.633 – rhinitis, allergic, seasonal
- MeSH C08.460.799.649 – rhinitis, atrophic
- MeSH C08.460.799.910 – rhinitis, vasomotor

=== MeSH C08.528 – pleural diseases ===
==== MeSH C08.528.240 – empyema, pleural ====
- MeSH C08.528.240.320 – empyema, tuberculous

==== MeSH C08.528.652 – pleural effusion ====
- MeSH C08.528.652.700 – pleural effusion, malignant

==== MeSH C08.528.694 – pleural neoplasms ====
- MeSH C08.528.694.700 – pleural effusion, malignant

==== MeSH C08.528.735 – pleurisy ====
- MeSH C08.528.735.473 – pleuropneumonia

==== MeSH C08.528.928 – tuberculosis, pleural ====
- MeSH C08.528.928.405 – empyema, tuberculous

=== MeSH C08.618 – respiration disorders ===
==== MeSH C08.618.085 – apnea ====
- MeSH C08.618.085.852 – sleep apnea syndromes
- MeSH C08.618.085.852.800 – sleep apnea, central
- MeSH C08.618.085.852.850 – sleep apnea, obstructive
- MeSH C08.618.085.852.850.500 – obesity hypoventilation syndrome

==== MeSH C08.618.326 – dyspnea ====
- MeSH C08.618.326.396 – dyspnea, paroxysmal

==== MeSH C08.618.501 – hyperventilation ====
- MeSH C08.618.501.271 – alkalosis, respiratory

==== MeSH C08.618.842 – respiratory distress syndrome, newborn ====
- MeSH C08.618.842.475 – hyaline membrane disease

==== MeSH C08.618.846 – respiratory insufficiency ====
- MeSH C08.618.846.093 – acidosis, respiratory
- MeSH C08.618.846.185 – airway obstruction
- MeSH C08.618.846.185.525 – nasal obstruction
- MeSH C08.618.846.414 – granuloma, laryngeal
- MeSH C08.618.846.450 – hantavirus pulmonary syndrome
- MeSH C08.618.846.565 – hypoventilation
- MeSH C08.618.846.565.500 – obesity hypoventilation syndrome
- MeSH C08.618.846.688 – positive-pressure respiration, intrinsic
- MeSH C08.618.846.812 – respiratory paralysis

=== MeSH C08.674 – respiratory hypersensitivity ===
==== MeSH C08.674.055 – alveolitis, extrinsic allergic ====
- MeSH C08.674.055.125 – bird fancier's lung
- MeSH C08.674.055.365 – farmer's lung

==== MeSH C08.674.095 – asthma ====
- MeSH C08.674.095.110 – asthma, exercise-induced
- MeSH C08.674.095.880 – status asthmaticus

=== MeSH C08.730 – respiratory tract infections ===
==== MeSH C08.730.085 – bovine respiratory disease complex ====
- MeSH C08.730.085.600 – pasteurellosis, pneumonic
- MeSH C08.730.085.660 – pneumonia, atypical interstitial, of cattle
- MeSH C08.730.085.675 – pneumonia of calves, enzootic

==== MeSH C08.730.099 – bronchitis ====
- MeSH C08.730.099.135 – bronchiolitis
- MeSH C08.730.099.135.321 – bronchiolitis, viral
- MeSH C08.730.099.567 – bronchitis, chronic

==== MeSH C08.730.265 – empyema, pleural ====
- MeSH C08.730.265.320 – empyema, tuberculous

==== MeSH C08.730.368 – laryngitis ====
- MeSH C08.730.368.351 – epiglottitis

==== MeSH C08.730.382 – legionellosis ====
- MeSH C08.730.382.380 – legionnaires' disease

==== MeSH C08.730.435 – lung diseases, fungal ====
- MeSH C08.730.435.090 – aspergillosis, allergic bronchopulmonary
- MeSH C08.730.435.700 – pneumonia, pneumocystis

==== MeSH C08.730.450 – lung diseases, parasitic ====
- MeSH C08.730.450.314 – echinococcosis, pulmonary

==== MeSH C08.730.582 – pleurisy ====
- MeSH C08.730.582.473 – pleuropneumonia

==== MeSH C08.730.610 – pneumonia ====
- MeSH C08.730.610.127 – bronchopneumonia
- MeSH C08.730.610.473 – pleuropneumonia
- MeSH C08.730.610.529 – pneumonia, aspiration
- MeSH C08.730.610.529.612 – pneumonia, lipid
- MeSH C08.730.610.540 – pneumonia, bacterial
- MeSH C08.730.610.540.500 – pneumonia, mycoplasma
- MeSH C08.730.610.540.530 – pneumonia of calves, enzootic
- MeSH C08.730.610.540.540 – pneumonia of swine, mycoplasmal
- MeSH C08.730.610.540.550 – pneumonia, pneumococcal
- MeSH C08.730.610.540.600 – pneumonia, rickettsial
- MeSH C08.730.610.540.620 – pneumonia, staphylococcal
- MeSH C08.730.610.675 – pneumonia, pneumocystis
- MeSH C08.730.610.763 – pneumonia, viral

==== MeSH C08.730.749 – sinusitis ====
- MeSH C08.730.749.267 – ethmoid sinusitis
- MeSH C08.730.749.387 – frontal sinusitis
- MeSH C08.730.749.578 – maxillary sinusitis
- MeSH C08.730.749.827 – sphenoid sinusitis

==== MeSH C08.730.817 – tonsillitis ====
- MeSH C08.730.817.700 – peritonsillar abscess

==== MeSH C08.730.912 – tuberculosis, pleural ====
- MeSH C08.730.912.405 – empyema, tuberculous

==== MeSH C08.730.939 – tuberculosis, pulmonary ====
- MeSH C08.730.939.669 – silicotuberculosis

=== MeSH C08.785 – respiratory tract neoplasms ===
==== MeSH C08.785.520 – lung neoplasms ====
- MeSH C08.785.520.140 – carcinoma, bronchogenic
- MeSH C08.785.520.145 – carcinoma, non-small-cell lung
- MeSH C08.785.520.147 – carcinoma, small cell
- MeSH C08.785.520.150 – coin lesion, pulmonary
- MeSH C08.785.520.734 – pancoast's syndrome
- MeSH C08.785.520.867 – pulmonary sclerosing hemangioma

==== MeSH C08.785.600 – nose neoplasms ====
- MeSH C08.785.600.693 – paranasal sinus neoplasms
- MeSH C08.785.600.693.575 – maxillary sinus neoplasms

==== MeSH C08.785.640 – pleural neoplasms ====
- MeSH C08.785.640.700 – pleural effusion, malignant

=== MeSH C08.846 – thoracic diseases ===
==== MeSH C08.846.187 – mediastinal diseases ====
- MeSH C08.846.187.145 – mediastinal cyst
- MeSH C08.846.187.290 – mediastinal emphysema
- MeSH C08.846.187.580 – mediastinal neoplasms
- MeSH C08.846.187.790 – mediastinitis

=== MeSH C08.907 – tracheal diseases ===
==== MeSH C08.907.863 – tracheoesophageal fistula ====
The list continues at List of MeSH codes (C09).
