= Inferior nasal concha =

Facial bone

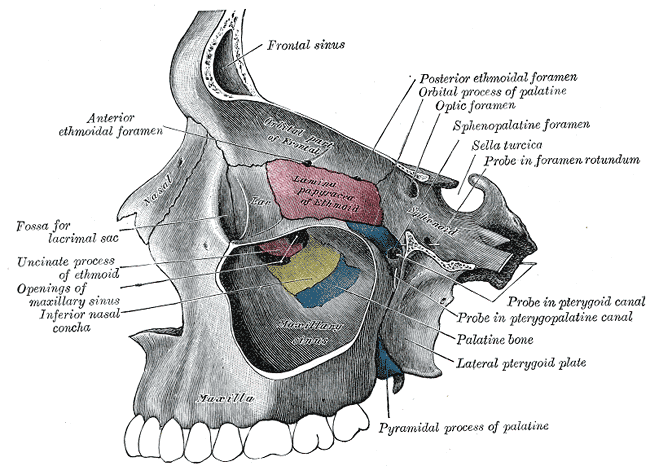
- Medial wall of left orbit. (Inferior nasal concha visible in center in yellow.)

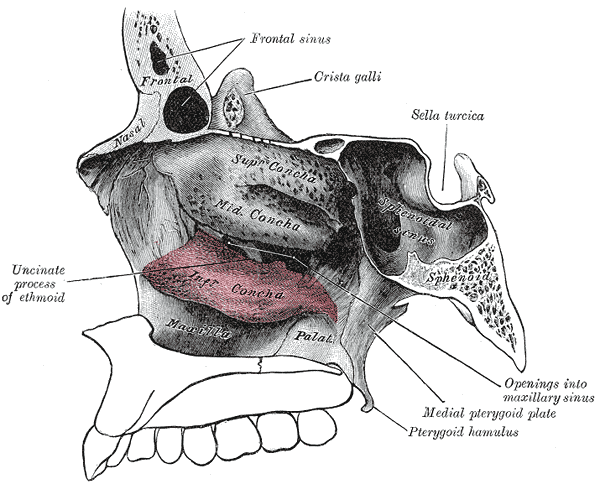
- Figure 1: Lateral wall of right nasal cavity showing inferior concha in situ. (pink)

Details
- Articulations: Ethmoid, maxilla, lacrimal and palatine bone

Identifiers
- Latin: concha nasi inferior, concha nasalis inferior
- TA98: A02.1.08.001
- TA2: 740
- FMA: 54736

Inferior nasal concha - animation 02

The inferior nasal concha (inferior turbinated bone or inferior turbinal/turbinate) is one of the three paired nasal conchae in the nose. It extends horizontally along the lateral wall of the nasal cavity and consists of a lamina of spongy bone, curled upon itself like a scroll, (turbinate meaning inverted cone). The inferior nasal conchae are considered a pair of facial bones. As the air passes through the turbinates, the air is churned against these mucosa-lined bones in order to receive warmth, moisture and cleansing. Superior to inferior nasal concha are the middle nasal concha and superior nasal concha which both arise from the ethmoid bone, of the cranial portion of the skull. Hence, these two are considered as a part of the cranial bones.

It has two surfaces, two borders, and two extremities.

== Structure ==
Right and left inferior nasal conchae

=== Surfaces ===
The medial surface is convex, perforated by numerous apertures, and traversed by longitudinal grooves for the lodgement of vessels.

The lateral surface is concave, and forms part of the inferior meatus.

=== Borders ===
Its upper border is thin, irregular, and connected to various bones along the lateral wall of the nasal cavity.

It may be divided into three portions: of these,

- the anterior articulates with the conchal crest of the maxilla;
- the posterior with the conchal crest of the palatine;
- the middle portion presents three well-marked processes, which vary much in their size and form.
  - Of these, the anterior or lacrimal process is small and pointed and is situated at the junction of the anterior fourth with the posterior three-fourths of the bone: it articulates, by its apex, with the descending process of the lacrimal bone, and, by its margins, with the groove on the back of the frontal process of the maxilla, and thus assists in forming the canal for the nasolacrimal duct.
  - Behind this process a broad, thin plate, the ethmoidal process, ascends to join the uncinate process of the ethmoid; from its lower border a thin lamina, the maxillary process, curves downward and lateralward; it articulates with the maxilla and forms a part of the medial wall of the maxillary sinus.

The inferior border is free, thick, and cellular in structure, more especially in the middle of the bone.

=== Extremities ===
Both extremities are more or less pointed, the posterior being the more tapering.

=== Development ===
The inferior nasal concha is ossified from a single center, which appears about the fifth month of fetal life in the lateral wall of the cartilaginous nasal capsule.

The entire inferior concha may be absent in some people. This is a consequence of embryologic agenesis and is a normal anatomic variant.

== Clinical significance ==
=== Dysfunction ===
Large, swollen inferior turbinates may lead to blockage of nasal breathing. Allergies, exposure to environmental irritants, or a persistent inflammation within the sinuses can lead to turbinate swelling. Deformity of the nasal septum can also result in enlarged turbinates.

Treatment of the underlying allergy or irritant may reduce turbinate swelling. In cases that do not resolve, or for treatment of deviated septum, turbinate surgery may be required.

=== Surgery ===
Inferior turbinate reduction is a surgery to reduce the size of the inferior turbinates. There are different techniques, including bipolar radiofrequency ablation (also known as somnoplasty), electrocautery, and use of cold steel instruments (e.g., microdebrider). Histological studies show that most of the mucosal thickening occurs in the medial layer, particularly due to venous congestion. Therefore, targeting the medial mucosa—while preserving sufficient tissue to maintain turbinate function—is considered optimal. Inferior turbinectomy is a surgery to remove the inferior turbinates.

In the case of turbinate reduction, only small amounts of turbinate tissue are removed because the turbinates are essential for respiration. Turbinectomy is usually reserved for patients who have persistent symptoms despite previous turbinate reduction surgery. Risks of reduction of the inferior or middle turbinates include empty nose syndrome.

== Additional images ==
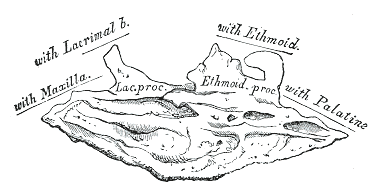
Right inferior nasal concha. Medial surface.

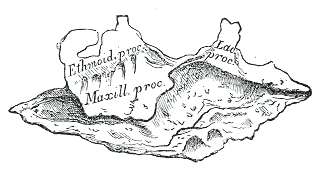
Right inferior nasal concha. Lateral surface.

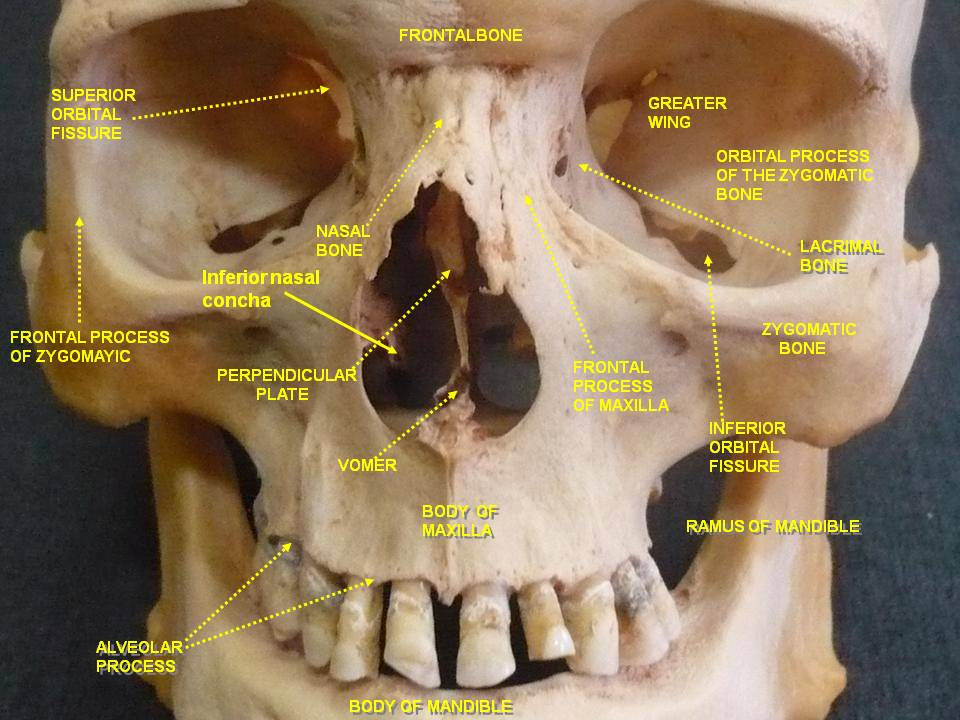
Human skull. Inferior nasal concha.

== See also ==
- Empty nose syndrome
- Nasal concha
