= List of MeSH codes (C09) =

The following is a partial list of the "C" codes for Medical Subject Headings (MeSH), as defined by the United States National Library of Medicine (NLM).

This list continues the information at List of MeSH codes (C08). Codes following these are found at List of MeSH codes (C10). For other MeSH codes, see List of MeSH codes.

The source for this content is the set of 2006 MeSH Trees from the NLM.

== MeSH C09 – otorhinolaryngologic diseases ==
=== MeSH C09.218 – ear diseases ===
==== MeSH C09.218.458 – hearing disorders ====
- MeSH C09.218.458.341 – hearing loss
- MeSH C09.218.458.341.186 – deafness
- MeSH C09.218.458.341.374 – hearing loss, bilateral
- MeSH C09.218.458.341.562 – hearing loss, conductive
- MeSH C09.218.458.341.750 – hearing loss, functional
- MeSH C09.218.458.341.812 – hearing loss, high-frequency
- MeSH C09.218.458.341.849 – hearing loss, mixed conductive-sensorineural
- MeSH C09.218.458.341.887 – hearing loss, sensorineural
- MeSH C09.218.458.341.887.432 – hearing loss, central
- MeSH C09.218.458.341.887.460 – hearing loss, noise-induced
- MeSH C09.218.458.341.887.772 – presbycusis
- MeSH C09.218.458.341.887.886 – usher syndromes
- MeSH C09.218.458.341.900 – hearing loss, sudden
- MeSH C09.218.458.341.950 – hearing loss, unilateral
- MeSH C09.218.458.505 – hyperacusis
- MeSH C09.218.458.670 – tinnitus

==== MeSH C09.218.568 – labyrinth diseases ====
- MeSH C09.218.568.120 – cochlear diseases
- MeSH C09.218.568.217 – endolymphatic hydrops
- MeSH C09.218.568.217.500 – Ménière's disease
- MeSH C09.218.568.315 – labyrinthitis
- MeSH C09.218.568.900 – vestibular diseases
- MeSH C09.218.568.900.883 – vertigo

==== MeSH C09.218.705 – otitis ====
- MeSH C09.218.705.496 – otitis externa
- MeSH C09.218.705.663 – otitis media
- MeSH C09.218.705.663.652 – mastoiditis
- MeSH C09.218.705.663.683 – otitis media with effusion
- MeSH C09.218.705.663.694 – otitis media, suppurative

==== MeSH C09.218.807 – retrocochlear diseases ====
- MeSH C09.218.807.186 – auditory diseases, central
- MeSH C09.218.807.186.094 – auditory perceptual disorders
- MeSH C09.218.807.186.432 – hearing loss, central
- MeSH C09.218.807.800 – vestibulocochlear nerve diseases
- MeSH C09.218.807.800.675 – neuroma, acoustic
- MeSH C09.218.807.800.675.500 – neurofibromatosis 2
- MeSH C09.218.807.800.837 – vestibular neuronitis

=== MeSH C09.400 – laryngeal diseases ===
==== MeSH C09.400.535 – laryngitis ====
- MeSH C09.400.535.365 – croup

==== MeSH C09.400.940 – voice disorders ====
- MeSH C09.400.940.160 – aphonia
- MeSH C09.400.940.490 – hoarseness

=== MeSH C09.603 – nose diseases ===
==== MeSH C09.603.669 – nose neoplasms ====
- MeSH C09.603.669.693 – paranasal sinus neoplasms
- MeSH C09.603.669.693.575 – maxillary sinus neoplasms

==== MeSH C09.603.692 – paranasal sinus diseases ====
- MeSH C09.603.692.503 – paranasal sinus neoplasms
- MeSH C09.603.692.503.503 – maxillary sinus neoplasms
- MeSH C09.603.692.752 – sinusitis
- MeSH C09.603.692.752.267 – ethmoid sinusitis
- MeSH C09.603.692.752.387 – frontal sinusitis
- MeSH C09.603.692.752.578 – maxillary sinusitis
- MeSH C09.603.692.752.827 – sphenoid sinusitis

==== MeSH C09.603.799 – rhinitis ====
- MeSH C09.603.799.631 – rhinitis, allergic, perennial
- MeSH C09.603.799.633 – rhinitis, allergic, seasonal
- MeSH C09.603.799.649 – rhinitis, atrophic
- MeSH C09.603.799.910 – rhinitis, vasomotor

=== MeSH C09.647 – otorhinolaryngologic neoplasms ===
==== MeSH C09.647.675 – neuroma, acoustic ====
- MeSH C09.647.675.500 – neurofibromatosis 2

==== MeSH C09.647.685 – nose neoplasms ====
- MeSH C09.647.685.693 – paranasal sinus neoplasms
- MeSH C09.647.685.693.575 – maxillary sinus neoplasms

==== MeSH C09.647.710 – pharyngeal neoplasms ====
- MeSH C09.647.710.485 – hypopharyngeal neoplasms
- MeSH C09.647.710.650 – nasopharyngeal neoplasms
- MeSH C09.647.710.685 – oropharyngeal neoplasms
- MeSH C09.647.710.685.800 – tonsillar neoplasms

=== MeSH C09.775 – pharyngeal diseases ===
==== MeSH C09.775.350 – nasopharyngeal diseases ====
- MeSH C09.775.350.650 – nasopharyngeal neoplasms
- MeSH C09.775.350.700 – nasopharyngitis

==== MeSH C09.775.549 – pharyngeal neoplasms ====
- MeSH C09.775.549.485 – hypopharyngeal neoplasms
- MeSH C09.775.549.650 – nasopharyngeal neoplasms
- MeSH C09.775.549.685 – oropharyngeal neoplasms
- MeSH C09.775.549.685.800 – tonsillar neoplasms

==== MeSH C09.775.955 – velopharyngeal insufficiency ====
The list continues at List of MeSH codes (C10).
