= Acrodynia =

Pain and pink skin discoloration due to mercury poisoning

- Other names: Bilderbeck's, Selter's, Swift's and Swift-Feer disease.
- Specialty: Emergency medicine

Acrodynia is a medical condition which occurs due to mercury poisoning. The condition of pain and dusky pink discoloration in the hands and feet is due to exposure or ingesting of mercury. It was known as pink disease (due to these symptoms) before it was accepted that it was just mercury poisoning. The word acrodynia is derived from Greek άκρος (akros) 'end, extremity' and οδύνη (odyni) 'pain'. As such, it might be (erroneously) used to indicate that a patient has pain in the hands or feet. The condition is known by various other names including hydrargyria, mercurialism, erythredema, erythredema polyneuropathy, Bilderbeck's, Selter's, Swift's and Swift-Feer disease.

== Symptoms and signs ==
Besides peripheral neuropathy (presenting as paresthesia or itching, burning or pain) and discoloration, swelling (edema) and desquamation may occur. Since mercury blocks the degradation pathway of catecholamines, epinephrine excess causes profuse sweating (diaphora), tachycardia, salivation and elevated blood pressure. Mercury is suggested to inactivate S-adenosyl-methionine, which is necessary for catecholamine catabolism by catechol-o-methyl transferase. Affected children may show red cheeks and nose, red (erythematous) lips, loss of hair, teeth, and nails, transient rashes, hypotonia and photophobia. Other symptoms may include kidney dysfunction (e.g. Fanconi syndrome) or neuropsychiatric symptoms (emotional lability, memory impairment, insomnia).

Thus, the clinical presentation may resemble pheochromocytoma or Kawasaki disease.

There is some evidence that the same mercury poisoning may predispose to Young's syndrome (men with bronchiectasis and low sperm count).

== Causes ==
Mercury compounds like calomel were historically used for various medical purposes: as laxatives, diuretics, antiseptics or antimicrobial drugs for syphilis, typhus and yellow fever. Teething powders were a widespread source of mercury poisoning until the recognition of mercury toxicity in the 1940s.

However, mercury poisoning and acrodynia still exist today. Modern sources of mercury intoxication include broken thermometers.

== Diagnosis ==
Removal of the inciting agent is the goal of treatment. Correcting fluid and electrolyte losses and rectifying any nutritional imbalances (vitamin-rich diets, vitamin-B complex) are of utmost importance in the treatment of the disease.

The chelating agent meso 2,3-dimercaptosuccinic acid has been shown to be the preferred treatment modality. It can almost completely prevent methylmercury uptake by erythrocytes and hepatocytes. In the past, dimercaprol (British antilewisite; 2,3-dimer-capto-l-propanol) and D-penicillamine were the most popular treatment modalities. Disodium edetate (Versene) was also used. Neither disodium edetate nor British antilewisite has proven reliable. British antilewisite has now been shown to increase CNS levels and exacerbate toxicity. N -acetyl-penicillamine has been successfully given to patients with mercury-induced neuropathies and chronic toxicity, although it is not approved for such uses. It has a less favorable adverse effect profile than meso 2,3-dimercaptosuccinic acid.

Hemodialysis with and without the addition of L-cysteine as a chelating agent has been used in some patients experiencing acute kidney injury from mercury toxicity. Peritoneal dialysis and plasma exchange also may be of benefit.

Tolazoline (Priscoline) has been shown to offer symptomatic relief from sympathetic overactivity. Antibiotics are necessary when massive hyperhidrosis, which may rapidly lead to miliaria rubra, is present. This can easily progress to bacterial secondary infection with a tendency for ulcerating pyoderma.
