= Forager (disambiguation) =

A forager is one who forages, i. e., looks for forage.

Forager may also refer to:

- A hunter-gatherer
  - Non-timber forest products (general discussion)
- Forager (character), a fictional superhero published by DC Comics
- Foraging theory, a branch of behavioral ecology
- ST Forager, a tug-in service with Steel & Bennie Ltd, Glasgow, from 1947 to 1962
- The Mariana and Palau Islands campaign in World War II, also known as Operation Forager
- The Forager, a 1910 American silent film
- Forager, a 2019 video game developed by HopFrog and released by Humble Bundle
- Forager (HBC vessel), operated by the HBC from 1839-1841, see Hudson's Bay Company vessels

== See also ==
- Forage (disambiguation)
- Forage analysis
- Forage harvester
- Forage War
- Category:Forages
