= Petrosal =

Petrosal may refer to:

- Inferior petrosal sinus
- Petrosal process
- Petrosal nerve (disambiguation)
- Petrous ganglion
- Petrous part of the temporal bone, in various animals referred to as the petrosal bone
- Petrosal bone
