= Process (anatomy) =

Projection or outgrowth of tissue from a larger body

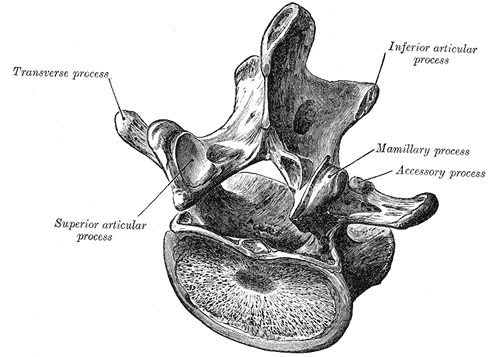
- The transverse, articular, mamillary and accessory processes of a lumbar vertebra.

Details

Identifiers
- Latin: processus
- TA98: A02.0.00.028
- TA2: 397
- FMA: 75428

In anatomy, a process (Latin: processus) is a projection or outgrowth of tissue from a larger body. For instance, in a vertebra, a process may serve for muscle attachment and leverage (as in the case of the transverse and spinous processes), or to fit (forming a synovial joint), with another vertebra (as in the case of the articular processes). The word is also used at the microanatomic level, where cells can have processes such as cilia or pedicels. Depending on the tissue, processes may also be called by other terms, such as apophysis, tubercle, or protuberance.

== Examples ==
Examples of processes include:

- The many processes of the human skull:
  - The mastoid and styloid processes of the temporal bone
  - The zygomatic process of the temporal bone
  - The zygomatic process of the frontal bone
  - The orbital, temporal, lateral, frontal, and maxillary processes of the zygomatic bone
  - The anterior, middle, and posterior clinoid processes and the petrosal process of the sphenoid bone
  - The uncinate process of the ethmoid bone
  - The jugular process of the occipital bone
  - The alveolar, frontal, zygomatic, and palatine processes of the maxilla
  - The ethmoidal and maxillary processes of the inferior nasal concha
  - The pyramidal, orbital, and sphenoidal processes of the palatine bone
  - The coronoid and condyloid processes of the mandible
- The xiphoid process at the end of the sternum
- The acromion and coracoid processes of the scapula
- The coronoid process of the ulna
- The radial and ulnar styloid processes
- The uncinate processes of ribs found in birds and reptiles
- The uncinate process of the pancreas
- The spinous, articular, transverse, accessory, uncinate, and mammillary processes of the vertebrae
- The trochlear process of the heel
- The appendix, which is sometimes called the "vermiform process", notably in Gray's Anatomy
- The olecranon process of the ulna

== See also ==
- Eminence
- Tubercle
- Appendage
- Pedicle of vertebral arch
