= Hyperventilation syndrome =

Medical condition involving hyperventilating

Hyperventilation syndrome.
- Specialty: Psychiatry, neurology, pulmonology

Hyperventilation syndrome (HVS), also known as chronic hyperventilation syndrome (CHVS), dysfunctional breathing hyperventilation syndrome, cryptotetany, spasmophilia, latent tetany, and central neuronal hyper excitability syndrome (NHS), is a respiratory disorder, psychologically or physiologically based, involving breathing too deeply or too rapidly (hyperventilation). HVS may present with chest pain and a tingling sensation in the fingertips and around the mouth (paresthesia), in some cases resulting in the hands "locking up" or cramping (carpopedal spasm, also known as Trousseau sign). HVS may accompany a panic attack.

People with HVS may feel that they cannot get enough air. In reality, they have about the same oxygenation in the arterial blood (normal values are about 98% for hemoglobin saturation) and too little carbon dioxide (hypocapnia) in their blood and other tissues. While oxygen is abundant in the bloodstream, HVS reduces effective delivery of that oxygen to vital organs due to low-CO_{2}-induced vasoconstriction and the suppressed Bohr effect.

The hyperventilation is self-promulgating as rapid or deep breathing causes carbon dioxide levels to fall below healthy levels, and respiratory alkalosis (high blood pH) develops. This makes the symptoms worse, which causes the person to breathe even faster, which then, further exacerbates the problem.

The respiratory alkalosis leads to changes in the way the nervous system fires and leads to the paresthesia, dizziness, and perceptual changes that often accompany this condition. Other mechanisms may also be at work, and some people are physiologically more susceptible to this phenomenon than others.

The mechanism for hyperventilation causing Paresthesia, lightheadedness, and fainting is: hyperventilation causes increased blood pH (see Respiratory alkalosis for this mechanism), which causes a decrease in free ionized calcium (Hypocalcaemia), which causes paresthesia and symptoms related to hypocalcaemia.

== Causes ==
Hyperventilation syndrome is believed to be caused by psychological factors. It is one cause of hyperventilation with others including infection, blood loss, heart attack, hypocapnia or alkalosis due to chemical imbalances, decreased cerebral blood flow, and increased nerve sensitivity.

In one study, one third of patients with HVS had "subtle but definite lung disease" that prompted them to breathe too frequently or too deeply.

A study, found that 77% of patients with empty nose syndrome have hyperventilation syndrome. Empty nose syndrome can appear in people having done nose surgery like cauterization, turbinectomy, turbinoplasty, etc.

Many people with panic disorder or agoraphobia will experience HVS. However, most people with HVS do not have these disorders.

== Diagnosis ==
Hyperventilation syndrome is a remarkably common cause of dizziness complaints. About 25% of patients who complain about dizziness are diagnosed with HVS.

A 1985 study, Efficacy of Nijmegen Questionnaire in recognition of the hyperventilation syndrome, stated: "It is concluded that the questionnaire is suitable as a screening instrument for early detection of HVS, and also as an aid in diagnosis and therapy planning."

== Treatment ==
One review of research, published in 2013, concluded "The results of this systematic review are unable to inform clinical practice, based on the inclusion of only 1 small poorly reported RCT [randomised controlled trial] ... Therefore, no recommendations for clinical practice can be made."

While traditional intervention for an acute episode has been to have the patient breathe into a paper bag, causing rebreathing and restoration of CO_{2} levels, this is not advised. The same benefits can be obtained more safely from deliberately slowing down the breathing rate by counting or looking at the second hand on a watch. This is sometimes referred to as "7–11 breathing", because a gentle inhalation is stretched out to take 7 seconds (or counts), and the exhalation is slowed to take 11 seconds. This in-/exhalation ratio can be safely decreased to 4–12 or even 4–20 and more, as the O_{2} content of the blood will easily sustain normal cell function for several minutes at rest when normal blood acidity has been restored.

It has also been suggested that breathing therapies such as the Buteyko Breathing method may be effective in reducing the symptoms and recurrence of the syndrome.

Benzodiazepines can be prescribed to reduce stress that provokes hyperventilation syndrome. Selective serotonin reuptake inhibitors (SSRIs) can reduce the severity and frequency of hyperventilation episodes.

== History ==
The original traditional treatment of breathing into a paper bag to control psychologically based hyperventilation syndrome (which is now almost universally known and often shown in movies and TV dramas) was invented by New York City physician (later radiologist), Alexander Winter, M.D. [1908–1978], based on his experiences in the U.S. Army Medical Corps during World War II and published in the Journal of the American Medical Association in 1951. Because other medical conditions can be confused with hyperventilation, namely asthma and heart attacks, most medical studies advise against using a paper bag since these conditions worsen when CO_{2} levels increase.
