= Forage (disambiguation) =

Forage may refer to:

- Forage, plant material (mainly plant leaves and stems) eaten by grazing livestock
- Forage (honey bee), bees' food supply consisting of nectar and pollen from blooming plants

== See also ==
- Foraging or Foraging theory, a topic in the behavioural ecology of animals
- Forage War, a partisan war of many small skirmishes that took place in New Jersey, USA during the American Revolutionary War in 1777
- Forage fish, small fish which are preyed on by larger predators for food
- Forager (disambiguation)
