= Young's operation =

- Specialty: Otorhinolaryngology

Young's operation is a surgery designed for the treatment of atrophic rhinitis, first described by Austen Young in 1967.

== Procedure ==
The surgical procedure involves closure of the nasal cavity affected with atrophic rhinitis by creating mucocutaneous flaps. These flaps are sutured together in two layers: first the mucosal layer, then the skin layer. The nasal cavity is kept closed for a period of 6 months/each; then an examination is done - if the crusts have disappeared, a revision surgery is performed and the nasal cavity is reopened. The theory behind this procedure is that the closed nasal cavity has time to heal.

=== Outcome ===
The first patient to undergo Young's operation specifically to treat Atrophic Rhinitis was in Sheffield in 1963, by Austen Young, when both nostrils were closed. The patient had a chronic condition causing social ostracism due to the strong odour. Both nostrils were re-opened in 1965 and the patient has had no problem since then (current as at October 2020). However, the patient has no sense of smell and inhibited taste (i.e. cannot taste spices/herbs).
