= Ethmoidal process of inferior nasal concha =

Anatomy

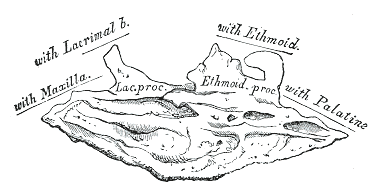
- Right inferior nasal concha. Medial surface. (Ethmoidal process labeled at center right.)

Details

Identifiers
- Latin: processus ethmoidalis conchae nasalis inferioris
- TA98: A02.1.08.004
- TA2: 743
- FMA: 54742

Behind the lacrimal process of the inferior nasal conchae lies a broad, thin plate, the ethmoidal process, which ascends to join the uncinate process of the ethmoid; from its lower border a thin lamina, the maxillary process, curves downward and lateralward; it articulates with the maxilla and forms a part of the medial wall of the maxillary sinus.
