= Peter Derrick Samman =

Peter Derrick Samman (20 March 1914 – 1 December 1992), was a British dermatologist who, along with William White, first published a case series of yellow nail syndrome in 1964.
