= Williams–Campbell syndrome =

- Other names: Bronchomalacia
- Usual onset: Typically childhood
- Causes: Genetic mutation
- Risk factors: Family history
- Diagnostic method: Diagnosis of exclusion, Bronchoscopy
- Prevention: None
- Treatment: Lung transplantation
- Frequency: Unknown but extremely rare

Williams–Campbell syndrome (WCS) is a disease of the airways where cartilage in the bronchi is defective. It is a form of congenital cystic bronchiectasis. This leads to collapse of the airways and bronchiectasis. It acts as one of the differential to allergic bronchopulmonary aspergillosis. WCS is a deficiency of the bronchial cartilage distally.

== Symptoms ==
1. Persistent cough
2. Wheeze
3. Impaired lung function

== Pathology ==
It is thought to result from a deficiency of cartilage formation in the 4th to 6th order segmental bronchi.

== Diagnosis ==
Most described cases present sporadically in early childhood. However, some have been diagnosed as late as adulthood. Due to its rarity it presents a difficulty in adult diagnoses, and its initial presentation can be confused with septic shock.

Diagnosis requires an appropriate clinical history, the characteristic expiratory airway collapse on radiological investigation, and exclusion of other causes of congenital and acquired bronchiectasis. Pathology of the affected bronchi by bronchoscopy showing the deficiency of cartilaginous plates in the bronchial wall is the confirmatory test. However, lung biopsy has several complications and is not always diagnostic.

Considering its non-invasive methodology, facility of execution, and good patient tolerance, multi-slice spiral CT or CT bronchoscopy should be the test of choice to study cystic lung diseases in particular WCS.

Radiologically, the lungs are overinflated, and on bronchoscopy bronchomalacia is demonstrated.

== Treatment ==
In 2011, Hacken et al. conducted a systematic review, aiming to answer what are the effects of treatments in people with bronchiectasis but without cystic fibrosis. There are not enough studies to prove if bronchopulmonary hygiene, physical therapy, mucolytics, inhaled hyperosmolar agents, oral corticosteroids, leukotriene receptor antagonists, short-acting beta 2 agonists, long-acting beta 2 agonists, or anticholinergic therapy is beneficial. However, there are some promising results in other approaches.

=== Lung transplantation ===
This was previously attempted in a patient with end-stage lung disease secondary to WCS. Although the patient did not have proximal airway collapse prior to transplantation, his posttransplant course was complicated by the development of bronchomalacia of the right and left mainstem bronchi. The patient experienced recurrent pulmonary infections and died of bacterial pneumonia one year after transplantation.

In 2012, the first WCS patient lung transplant with prolonged survival (approaching 10 years) was reported.

=== Lobectomy ===
Surgery to remove part of the lungs is often considered for people with extreme damage to one or two lobes of the lung who are at risk of severe infection or bleeding. However, surgery in two patients, one given a triple lobectomy and the other a right upper lobectomy, resulted in severe respiratory failure.

=== Medicine ===
WCS is an obstructive disorder that shares some similarities with chronic obstructive pulmonary disorder (COPD). Non-invasive positive pressure ventilation (NPPV) has been reported to improve chronic respiratory failure in patients with bronchiectasis. NPPV combined with long-term home oxygen therapy decreases carbon dioxide retention and improves dyspnea in hypercapnic COPD. Moreover, long-term NPPV may decrease acute exacerbation and recurrent hospitalization. There are case reports that NPPV may have an advantage in adult patients with WCS who have severe respiratory failure and recurrent pulmonary infections.

== History ==
It was described in 1960 by Howard Williams and Peter Campbell. They described a case study of five children with similar clinical and radiological symptoms, and proposed that the abnormal development of cartilage in bronchial tree was responsible for this presentation.

In 1976, the first report of the occurrence of familial bronchiectasis in siblings was published, and it supported the theory that WCS was congenital, based on the uniformity of the cartilaginous defect. It may have been the result of an autosomal recessive mutation, but the specific gene has not yet been identified.
