= Petrosal nerve =

Petrosal nerve may refer to:

- Deep petrosal nerve
- Greater petrosal nerve (also known as the greater superficial petrosal nerve)
- Lesser petrosal nerve (also known as the lesser superficial petrosal nerve) from the geniculate ganglion to the otic ganglion

== See also ==
- Petrosal (disambiguation)
