= Merciful anosmia =

Upper respiratory medical condition

Merciful anosmia is a condition in which the person is unaware of a foul smell emanating from their own nose. This condition is seen in atrophic rhinitis. In atrophic rhinitis, the turbinates, venous sinusoids, seromucinous glands and nerves undergo atrophy, resulting in a foul smelling discharge. As the nerve fibres sensing smell are also atrophied, the patient is unable to appreciate the foul smell.
