= Somnoplasty =

Medical procedure

Somnoplasty is type of sleep surgery using radiofrequency ablation medical devices for habitual snoring, chronic nasal obstruction, and obstructive sleep apnea (OSA) to shrink the tissues that are causing obstruction. Somnoplasty is typically an outpatient procedure that takes 30–45 minutes.

== Procedure ==
Prior to somnoplasty procedure, a doctor may want a patient to attempt more conservative remedies such as sleeping in a different position. Once the Somnoplasty procedure is started, the patient is given a local anesthetic and a special needle-like electrode with an insulating sleeve covering all but the tip, that delivers RF energy under the surface of the tissue. The electrode is used to administer controlled, low-power RF energy to create coagulative (clotting) lesions, where tissue is denatured, beneath the mucosa (lining) of the targeted areas:

- For chronic nasal obstruction, the turbinates are targeted
- For habitual snoring, the soft palate and the uvula are targeted
- For obstructive sleep apnea, the base of the tongue and other airway structures are targeted

Note: the actual areas targeted depends on each individual's specific anatomy, so the above are just general associations.

After 6–8 weeks, the lesions are naturally resorbed as the necrotic tissue is swept away and the surface sinks to fill the void, which reduces the volume of the tissue while stiffening what remains. When this occurs the airway is enlarged, allowing a less-restricted flow of air. In addition, the scar tissue at the margins of the lesion is relatively firm and less inclined to contribute to snoring. Several follow-up treatments are usually required to obtain the desired results. Most insurance companies do not cover somnoplasty since it is not a widely accepted treatment for sleep apnea.

== Side effects ==
Common side effects include swelling and discomfort. Rarer side effects include bleeding and infection.

== History ==
Somnoplasty was invented by Stuart D. Edwards, and Ingemar Henry Lundquist of Menlo Park, California. The original patent assignee was Vidamed, Inc. It is currently marketed by Somnus Medical Technologies, Inc. of Sunnyvale, California. Somnoplasty is a trademark by Somnus Medical Technologies.

== See also ==
- Nasal concha
- Turbinectomy
- Septoplasty
- Empty Nose Syndrome
