= Yellow nail syndrome =

- Other names: primary lymphedema
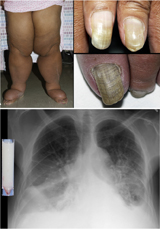
- Yellow nail syndrome: This patient has a 20-year history of severe lymphedema of her legs; thick, ridged, yellowish, hypercurved thumbnails (top right); similarly affected, yellow-green to brown toenails (bottom right); and bilateral, chylous pleural effusions. A sample of her chylous pleural fluid is shown to the left of the radiograph.
- Specialty: Dermatology

Yellow nail syndrome, also known as "primary lymphedema associated with yellow nails and pleural effusion", is a very rare medical syndrome that includes pleural effusions, lymphedema (due to under development of the lymphatic vessels) and yellow dystrophic nails. Approximately 40% will also have bronchiectasis. It is also associated with chronic sinusitis and persistent coughing. It usually affects adults.

== Signs and symptoms ==
The nails are markedly thickened with yellow to yellow-green discoloration of the nails. They grow slowly, at a rate of 0.25 mm/week or less. The nails may have ridges and increased side-to-side curvature, reduction of the white crescent and detachment of the nail from the nailbed. These nail abnormalities may also change over time.

Most people with yellow nail syndrome (four fifths) have lymphedema; it is symmetrical and typically affects both legs. It is the first symptom of the condition in about a third. Involvement of the arms and face is more unusual, as is lymphedema of the abdomen with ascites (fluid collection in the abdominal cavity) and fluid collection around the heart.

Various lung problems can occur in people with yellow nail syndrome. Many experience cough and shortness of breath. Forty percent of cases develop pleural effusions, which are collections of fluid in the pleural cavity (the space that contains the lungs and normally only has a minimal amount of fluid in it). About half of all people with yellow nail syndrome have either recurrent chest infections or a chronic lung condition known as bronchiectasis which causes chronic production of sputum with episodes of worsening. Forty percent of people with yellow nail syndrome have chronic sinusitis.

Yellow nail syndrome has been associated with some drugs, e.g. penicillamine, bucillamine and gold sodium thiomalate.

It has also been associated with exposure to titanium from dental implants or consuming food containing titanium dioxide.

== Genetics ==
Although it has been described in families, it has been suggested that it might not have a genetic link.

== Diagnosis ==
The diagnosis is based on the combination of the symptoms. Generally, people are diagnosed with yellow nail syndrome if they have two or three of the three classical symptoms (yellow nails, lymphedema and pleural effusion). The nail changes are considered essential for the diagnosis, but they can be subtle.

Pulmonary function testing can show obstruction of the airways. People with pleural effusions may show evidence of restriction in lung volumes due to the fluid. Analysis of the fluid in pleural effusions generally shows high levels of protein but low levels of cholesterol and lactate dehydrogenase, but about 30% of effusions are chylous (chylothorax) in that they have the characteristics of lymph.

A lymphogram may be performed in people with lymphedema. This can show both under developed (hypoplastic) lymphatic ducts and dilated ducts. Dye may be found in the skin months after the initial test. Scintigraphy of lymph flow (lymphoscintigraphy) shows delays in drainage of lymph (sometimes asymmetrically), although this test can also be normal.

== Treatment ==
Normal treatment for swelling and any respiratory problems is appropriate. Nutritional supplementation with Vitamin E in some studies has been shown to be effective in controlling nail changes.

== Prognosis ==
People with yellow nail syndrome have been found to have a moderately reduced lifespan compared to people without the condition.

== Epidemiology ==
The condition is thought to be rare, with approximately 150 cases described in the medical literature.

== History ==
The condition was first reported by Heller in 1927 and the first case series was described in a publication in 1964 by London physicians Peter Samman and William White. Other cases may have been recorded in 1962.
