= Turbinate reduction =

Surgical removal of the turbinate bones in the nasal passage

Turbinectomy/Turbinoplasty
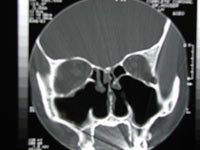
- CT scan of the nose after total bilateral turbinectomy
- ICD-9-CM: 21.6

Turbinate reduction is a surgical procedure, that removes tissue, and sometimes bone, of the turbinates in the nasal passage, particularly the inferior nasal concha. The procedure is usually performed to relieve nasal obstructions. In most cases, turbinate hypertrophy is accompanied by some septum deviation, so the surgery is done along with septoplasty.

== Indications ==
Turbinate reduction is usually performed when medical management fails to resolve turbinate hypertrophy, where the turbinates are swollen and enlarged. Common causes of this condition are allergies, environmental irritants, or a deviated septum.

== Procedure ==
=== Traditional methods ===
There are many different techniques used in turbinate reduction, including turbinectomy (partial, total), electrocautery, cryotherapy (cryoturbinectomy), laser vaporization, and various methods of turbinoplasty. These require general anesthesia.

=== Radiofrequency ablation ===
The use of radiofrequency ablation has shown to be a safer alternative, being performed as an outpatient procedure, using lidocaine for local anesthesia. It does not alter the epithelial structure or function. It causes no postoperative pain, bleeding, or crusting, though it can result in some temporary nasal blockage or rhinorrhea due to resulting inflammation.

== Complications ==
Empty nose syndrome, one form of atrophic rhinitis, is a condition that can develop as a result of turbinate surgery or other surgeries that have an impact on the turbinates. It is a rare condition in which people whose nasal passages are clear following turbinate surgery experience a number of symptoms, including feelings of nasal obstruction, nasal dryness, and crusting, as well as a sensation of being unable to breathe, inter alia.

== See also ==
- Nasal concha
- Nasal obstruction
- Somnoplasty
- Septoplasty
