= Ingemar Lundquist =

American inventor and mechanical engineer (1921–2007)

- Born: Ingemar Henry Lundquist; October 19, 1921; Stockholm, Sweden
- Died: February 25, 2007 (aged 85); Carmel Valley, California, U.S.
- Resting place: Mountain View Cemetery (Oakland, California); 37°50′07″N 122°14′13″W
- Citizenship: American
- Education: Stockholm Institute of Technology
- Spouse: Mary Lundquist (until her death); Linda Lundquist
- Children: Richard Lundquist; Christian Lundquist
- Engineering career
- Discipline: Mechanical Engineering
- Employers: Torex, Inc., Ultimax, Inc., Vidamed, Inc.
- Projects: Balloon Angioplasty, Somnoplasty, T.U.N.A.

Ingemar Henry Lundquist (October 19, 1921 – February 25, 2007) was a Swedish inventor and mechanical engineer. He became an American citizen in 1950.

== Early life and education ==
Lundquist graduated from the Stockholm Institute of Technology in 1945 with a mechanical engineering degree. He migrated to the United States in 1948 and became an American citizen in 1950.

== Career ==
He worked for various medical technology companies in the San Francisco Bay Area, including Advanced Cardiovascular Systems and E. P. Technologies.

=== Patents ===
Lundquist had hundreds of inventions, typically working in his garage or basement. He held more than a hundred patents. His inventions included over-the-wire balloon angioplasty, T.U.N.A., and somnoplasty. He also worked on cardiac stem-cell therapy.
