= Fog fever =

Cattle disease

Fog fever is a refeeding syndrome in cattle, clinically named acute bovine pulmonary emphysema and edema (ABPEE) and bovine atypical interstitial pneumonia. This veterinary disease in adult cattle follows an abrupt move from feedlot (dried feed indoors) to 'foggage pasture' (fast growing, lush pasture, with high protein levels). Clinical signs begin within 1 to 14 days and death may follow within 2 to 4 days. The condition can affect up to 50% of the herd, and around 30% of affected cattle may die as a result. This metabolic nutritional-respiratory disturbance has also been reported in other ruminants (red deer) and on a wide variety of grasses, alfalfa, rape, kale, and turnip tops.

== Clinical signs ==
The bovine experiences difficulty breathing and will do everything it can to ease this discomfort. It will try to stand with its airway as straight and extended as possible, raising its head and stretching its neck forwards. Breathing rate will increase as high as 80 breaths per minute. there may also be extension of the tongue, and drooling. The animal may grunt as it breathes and froth may form around the mouth as the condition progresses. Rectal temperature will be normal, although some may show an elevated temperature from respiratory effort.

== Cause ==
'Fog fever' results from feedlot economics and the biochemistry of the cattle stomach (rumen) being slow to adjust to green grazing. After a low-protein, dried formulation, cattle are less prepared for a sudden, large exposure to high-protein grass. The level of L-tryptophan in crops is most likely to be high in lush, rapidly growing pastures, particularly (but not exclusively) in the fall. The change in diet to vegetation rich in L-tryptophan causes a corresponding increase of the amino acid typically found in protein in the rumen. Lactobacillus bacteria in the rumen degrade L-tryptophan to indoleacetic acid; bacteria in the rumen convert this to 3-methylindole (3MI) (skatole), which is readily absorbed through the rumen wall into the portal circulation. (3-methylindole is produced exclusively from indoleacetic acid and not directly from L-tryptophan.) Club cells in the terminal bronchioles convert the 3-methylindole to 3-methyleneindolenine, which is toxic to the adjacent alveolar epithelial cells. This toxicity leads to emphysema and pulmonary edema which may cause death by asphyxiation.

In the history of research into this causative pathway, the roles of L-tryptophan and indoleacetic acid to 3-methylindole were identified as early as 1967 and 1972.

== Treatment ==
There is little that can be done for affected cattle. They should be moved from the pasture only on the advice of a veterinarian, since the stress of movement can be deadly even in less severely affected cattle. Mild cases may recover quickly, but full recovery may require a few weeks.

== Prevention ==
Ideally pastures should be used before they become overly lush and protein-rich. If this is not possible, the new diet should be introduced slowly by grazing the cattle just a few hours each day and increasing gradually, over a period of a fortnight. Cutting the pasture immediately before putting the cattle out may help. Drugs are available (monensin or lasalocid) which change the rumen biochemistry in preparation for high tryptophan levels, inhibiting the bacteria that convert L-tryptophan to 3-methylindole. Care must be taken to keep these products away from horses, for which, since horses have no rumen, they are toxic.

== See also ==
- Forage analysis
