= Young's syndrome =

- Other names: Azoospermia sinopulmonary infections

Young's syndrome, also known as azoospermia sinopulmonary infections, sinusitis-infertility syndrome and Barry-Perkins-Young syndrome, is a rare condition that encompasses a combination of syndromes such as bronchiectasis, rhinosinusitis and reduced male fertility. In individuals with this syndrome the functioning of the lungs is usually normal but the mucus is abnormally viscous. The reduced fertility (obstructive azoospermia) is due to functional obstruction of sperm transport down the genital tract at the epididymis, where the sperm is found in viscous, lipid-rich fluid. The syndrome was named after Donald Young, the urologist who first made observations of the clinical signs of the syndrome in 1972. Possible causes include genetics, and exposure to mercury during childhood, but the cause is unknown.

== See also ==
- Infertility
- Cystic fibrosis
