= Petrosal process =

Bone projection of the sphenoid bone

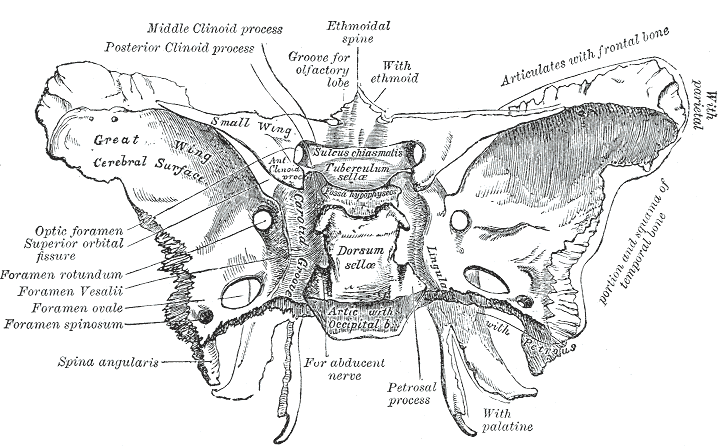
- Sphenoid bone. Upper surface. Petrosal process labeled at bottom center

Details

Identifiers
- Latin: processus petrosus (ossis sphenoidalis)

The petrosal process is a sharp process below the notch for the passage of the abducent nerve on either side of the dorsum sellae of the sphenoid bone. It articulates with the apex of the petrous portion of the temporal bone, and forms the medial boundary of the foramen lacerum.
