= Tracheobronchomegaly =

- Other names: Mounier-Kühn syndrome
- Specialty: Pulmonology
- Complications: Recurrent pulmonary infections
- Causes: atrophy of elastic fibers in the trachea and main bronchi, leading to thinning of the smooth muscle layer
- Diagnostic method: CT Chest. Tracheobroncheal flaccidity, dilatation, and/or collapse.
- Frequency: <500 reported cases as of 2025

Tracheobronchomegaly is a rare lung condition characterised by abnormal widening of the trachea and main bronchi, typically presenting with no symptoms, or a long-standing cough or recurrent chest infections. There may be copious purulent sputum production, eventually leading to bronchiectasis and other respiratory complications.

It may be acquired secondary to another lung disease or medical lung procedure, but when no cause is identified it is presumed congenital and is known as Mounier-Kühn syndrome.

Diagnosis is by medical imaging and excluding other causes of long-term cough. Typically the trachea appears wide on chest X-ray.

== Signs and symptoms ==
The abnormally widened trachea and mainstem bronchi are associated with recurrent lower respiratory tract infection and copious purulent sputum production, eventually leading to bronchiectasis and other respiratory complications.

== Diagnosis ==
Diagnosis is by medical imaging and excluding other causes of long-term cough. Typically the trachea appears wide on chest X-ray.

Woodring et al. (1991) suggested the following diagnostic criteria for tracheomegaly in adults based on chest radiography:

- Adult Males: Tracheal transverse diameter > 25 mm and sagittal diameter > 27 mm.
- Adult Females: Tracheal transverse diameter > 21 mm and sagittal diameter > 23 mm.

== History ==
The term "Mounier-Kuhn syndrome" derives from the characterization of the condition by Prof. Pierre-Louis Mounier-Kuhn in 1932, while the name "tracheobronchomegaly" was introduced by Katz et al. in 1962.
