= Forage analysis =

Forage analysis is an integral part of modern animal production. Livestock managers require detailed information about the feedstuffs of their herds in order to best achieve production goals, whether they are concerned with economic efficiency, nutrient efficiency or maximum yields. There are various methods of analysing livestock diets for different constituents all differing in expense, time, and accuracy. The focus of most studies is the following three main attributes; Metabolisable Energy (MJ/Kg), Protein content (%) and Fibre content (%).

== See also ==
- Fog fever
