= Chronic atrophic rhinitis =

Chronic inflammation and degradation of the nose

- Specialty: Otorhinolaryngology

Chronic atrophic rhinitis (often simply atrophic rhinitis) is a chronic inflammation of the nose characterised by atrophy of nasal mucosa, including the glands, turbinate bones and the nerve elements supplying the nose. Chronic atrophic rhinitis may be primary and secondary. Special forms of chronic atrophic rhinitis are rhinitis sicca anterior and ozaena. It can be described by empty nose syndrome.

== Signs and symptoms ==
- It is most commonly seen in females.
- It is reported among patients from lower socioeconomic groups.
- The nasal cavities become roomy and are filled with foul smelling crusts which are black or dark green and dry, making expiration painful and difficult.
- Microorganisms are known to multiply and produce a foul smell from the nose, though the patients may not be aware of this, because the nerve endings (responsible for the perception of smell) have become atrophied. This is called merciful anosmia.
- Patients usually complain of nasal obstruction despite the roomy nasal cavity, which can be caused either by the obstruction produced by the discharge in the nose, or as a result of sensory loss due to atrophy of nerves in the nose, so the patient is unaware of the air flow. In the case of the second cause, the sensation of obstruction is subjective.
- Bleeding from the nose, also called epistaxis, may occur when the dried discharge (crusts) are removed.
- Septal perforation and dermatitis of nasal vestibule can occur. The nose may show a saddle-nose deformity.
- Atrophic rhinitis is also associated with similar atrophic changes in the pharynx or larynx, producing symptoms pertaining to these structures. Hearing impairment can occur due to Eustachian tube blockage causing middle ear effusion.

== Etiology ==
Causes can be remembered by the mnemonic HERNIA:

- Hereditary factors: the disease runs in families
- Endocrine imbalance: the disease tends to start at puberty and mostly involves females
- Racial factors: white people are more susceptible than natives of equatorial Africa
- Nutritional deficiency: vitamins A or D, or iron
- Infection: Klebsiella pneumoniae subsp. ozaenae, diphtheroids, Proteus vulgaris, E. coli, etc.
- Autoimmune factors: viral infection or some other unidentified insult may trigger antigenicity of the nasal mucosa.

=== Secondary atrophic rhinitis ===
Specific infections, such as syphilis, leprosy and rhinoscleroma, may cause destruction of the nasal structures leading to atrophic changes. Atrophic rhinitis can also result from long-standing purulent sinusitis or radiotherapy of the nose, or as a complication of surgery of the turbinates. The United Kingdom National Health Service has stated that "Most cases of atrophic rhinitis in the UK occur when the turbinates are damaged or removed during surgery". Some authors refer to as Atrophic rhinitis secondary to sinus surgery as the empty nose syndrome.

=== Unilateral atrophic rhinitis ===
Extreme deviation of nasal septum may be accompanied by atrophic rhinitis on the wider side.

== Pathology ==
- The ciliated columnar epithelium of the nasal mucosa is replaced by stratified squamous epithelium.
- Atrophy of mucosa, turbinal bones and seromucinous glands tends to occur, due to obliterative endarteritis and periarteritis causing decreased blood supply, hence the supplying area atrophies.
- Arrested development of paranasal sinuses.

== Diagnosis ==
Diagnosis is based on clinical history and examination. Examination is clinical, via anterior rhinoscopy and fibreoptic, using nasendoscopy. A CT scan can be used to confirm the diagnosis and review disease extent.

== Treatment ==
Treatment of atrophic rhinitis can be either medical or surgical.

Medical measures include:

- Nasal irrigation using normal saline
- Nasal irrigation and removal of crusts using alkaline nasal solutions.
- 25% glucose in glycerine can be applied to the nasal mucosa to inhibit the growth of proteolytic organisms which produce foul smell.
- Local antibiotics, such as Chloromycetin.
- Vitamin D_{2} .
- Estradiol spray for regeneration of seromucinous glands and vascularization of mucosa.
- Systemic streptomycin (1g/day) against Klebsiella organisms.
- Oral potassium iodide for liquefaction of secretion.
- Placental extract injected in the submucosa.
- Rifampicin 600 mg once daily for 12 weeks.

Surgical interventions include:

- Young's operation.
- Modified Young's operation.
- Narrowing of nasal cavities, submucosal injection of Teflon paste (William's operation), section and medial displacement of the lateral wall of the nose.
- Transposition of parotid duct to maxillary sinus or nasal mucosa (Wittmack's operation)
- Complete inversion of mucoperiosteum of maxillary antrum to create a neo-turbinate (Raghav Sharan's operation)
- Repeated Stellate ganglion block (Sardana's operation)
- Vestibuloplasty

== History ==
This disorder was known since the time of ancient Egypt, almost 4,000 years ago, and descriptions of it are found in the historical medical papyri. In the Edwin Smith Papyrus (1700 BC) it was prescribed a treatment based on wine and breast milk to cure this disease. The ancient Greek and Indian civilizations were aware of atrophic rhinitis.
