= Lethal midline granuloma =

- Other names: Extranodal NK/T-cell lymphoma, nasal type
- Specialty: Oncology and hematology
- Causes: Epstein–Barr virus

Lethal midline granuloma (LMG) is an historical term for a condition in which necrotic and highly destructive lesions develop progressively in the middle of the face, principally the nose and palate. Many cases presented with ulcerations in or perforations of the palate.

LMG was thought to be a manifestation of three or four different diseases: the well-characterized disease of granulomatosis with polyangiitis, the ill-defined disorders of polymorphic reticulosis or mid-line malignant reticulosis, and an incompletely defined form of non-Hodgkin lymphoma. Subsequent studies found that the cells infiltrating the midline tissues in cases of lethal midline granuloma that were not clearly diagnosed as granulomatosis with polyangiitis were: a) infected by the Epstein–Barr virus and b) consisted of malignant lymphocytes, usually NK cells or, rarely, cytotoxic T cells. The disease is therefore now regarded as a NK/T cell malignancy, is grouped with other Epstein–Barr virus–associated lymphoproliferative diseases and is classified by the World Health Organization (2017 update) as a manifestation of the well-defined disease, extranodal NK/T-cell lymphoma, nasal type (ENKTCL-NT).

ENKTCL-NT is a rare type of lymphoma that commonly involves the nasal cavity, oral cavity, and/or pharynx but less commonly can also involve the eye, larynx, lung, gastrointestinal tract, skin, and various other tissues. Patients presenting with highly localized midline facial disease fit the historical definition of lethal midline granuloma. These cases, unlike other cases ENKTCL-NT that have more widespread disease, often show no or relatively little progression of their disease over long periods of time. Since cases of LMG that were manifestations of granulomatosis with polyangiitis, a vascular inflammatory but not malignant disease, the term lethal midline granuloma is considered confusing and obsolete.
