= Maxillary process of inferior nasal concha =

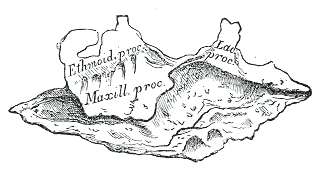
- Right inferior nasal concha. Lateral surface.

Details

Identifiers
- Latin: processus maxillaris conchae nasalis inferioris
- TA98: A02.1.08.003
- TA2: 742
- FMA: 54741

From the lower border of the inferior nasal concha, a thin lamina, the maxillary process, curves downward and laterally; it articulates with the maxilla and forms a part of the medial wall of the maxillary sinus.
