= Empty nose syndrome =

Medical symptoms including a sense of suffocation despite a clear airway

Empty Nose Syndrome
- Other names: Secondary atrophic rhinitis
- ENS caused by loss of the inferior half of the left inferior turbinate.
- Specialty: Otolaryngology
- Symptoms: Sensation of nasal suffocation despite clear airway, loss of airflow sensation
- Complications: Hyperventilation syndrome, depression, anxiety, fatigue
- Usual onset: Following surgery or any procedure to the nasal interior
- Differential diagnosis: Anxiety, Hyperventilation
- Treatment: Artificial nasal moisture, experimental corrective surgeries
- Frequency: Unknown, but considered rare in medical literature

Empty nose syndrome (ENS) is a clinical syndrome in which there is a sensation of suffocation despite a clear airway. This syndrome is often referred to as a form of secondary atrophic rhinitis. ENS is a potential complication of nasal turbinate surgery or procedure. Affected individuals have usually undergone a turbinectomy (total or partial resection of structures inside the nose called turbinates), or other surgical procedures of the nasal turbinates.

There is a range of symptoms, including feelings of nasal obstruction, loss of airflow sensation, nasal dryness and crusting, and a sensation of being unable to breathe. Sleep may be severely impaired due to one or a combination of these symptoms. ENS onset can be immediately after surgery or delayed.

The overall incidence of ENS is unknown due to the small body of epidemiological study and the lack of a dedicated International Classification of Diseases (ICD-10) code, which would allow incidence reporting of the syndrome. Many cases of ENS may be unrecognized, underdiagnosed, and unreported.

ENS usually occurs with unobstructed nasal passages with a history of previous surgical intervention and sensations of suffocation or obstruction following recovery. Early literature attributed ENS to complete inferior turbinate resection, but later research demonstrated the syndrome in patients who had undergone a range of procedures that involved nasal turbinates (both middle and inferior), including conservative reductions. Even unilateral (one-sided) ENS has been reported.

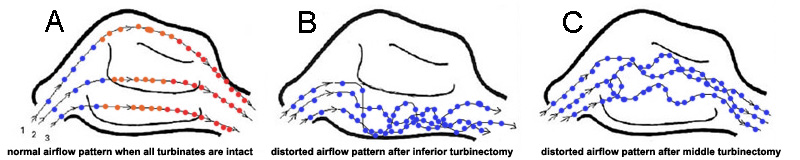
Altered airflow patterns after resection.

The existence of ENS as a distinct medical condition is controversial. More ear, nose and throat (ENT) practitioners and plastic surgeons are recognizing the condition. The Haute-Autorité de Santé (HAS) published guidelines in 2022. ENS is not fully understood and practitioner knowledge about altered nasal breathing in turbinate surgeries varies. Understanding why some individuals exhibit ENS symptoms while others do not and incorrectly attributing symptoms to psychological causes such as anxiety are common reasons people with ENS do not receive care. ENS as a distinct condition is subject to debate, including whether it should be considered solely rhinologic or whether it may have neurological or psychosomatic aspects. Growing awareness of the syndrome and an increasing body of research has led to more acceptance by ENT practitioners.

== Signs and symptoms ==
The major symptoms of ENS include a sensation of suffocation, nasal dryness, nasal burning, nasal crusting, and an impaired sense of airflow through the nose in patients who have had surgery or any procedure to nasal turbinates. ENS can greatly reduce a patient's quality of life and many patients struggle to complete activities of daily living. While ENS is physical in its origin, many ENS patients also struggle with depression, anxiety, and sleep disturbances. Individuals with ENS may experience all or some of these symptoms.

A limited study of ENS patients found that ENS is associated with hyperventilation syndrome (HVS) in 77.3% of the study population. The study suggests that there could be an epidemiological link between ENS and HVS. The possible link between ENS and HVS could be explained by changes to the respiratory control system. Another study found that laryngopharyngeal reflux disease (LPRD) symptoms and prevalence were significantly higher in ENS patients compared to controls.

ENS patients have higher scores on the Epworth Sleepiness Scale compared to control groups. The severity of ENS symptoms correlated with severity of sleepiness. Sleep apnea is correlated with severity of ENS symptoms and high BMI.

== Cause ==
Downward shift post-IMAP, from middle to inferior meatus.

The cause of ENS may be due to the body not accepting the new airflow in the nasal passages following surgical procedures, indicated sometimes by an improvement in sensation after placement of wet cotton in place of the missing turbinate. The nose is an incredibly complex area of the body and one that has been very poorly researched in terms of the effects on aerodynamics from surgical procedures. In many patients with ENS, the airflow is modeled as being more turbulent with less laminar flow across the mucosa. This reduced amount of mucus in the nose can also be attributed to the change in airflow often resulting in dry cool air hitting the back of the patient's throat.

One possible cause may be changes to the nasal mucous membrane and to the nerve endings in the mucosa resulting from chronic changes to the temperature and humidity of the air flowing inside the nose, caused in turn by removal or reduction of the turbinates. The TRPM8 receptor, responsible for the sensation of nasal openness (patency), is activated by high-speed airflow, which cools the nasal lining through evaporation. This cooling triggers signals to the brain, making breathing feel easier. Nasal passage enlargement alters airflow, reducing turbulence and mucosal cooling which results in reduced sensation of airflow. Studies confirm that without the inferior turbinate, air conditioning in the nose is less effective.

Direct damage to the nerves may be a result of surgical intervention; however, as of 2015, there is no technology that allows the mapping of the sensory nerves within the nose, so it is difficult to determine whether this is causative of ENS. Nerve healing varies, sometimes leading to long-term numbness or altered sensation. Investigators have been unable to identify consistent diagnostic or precipitating features, psychological causes leading to a psychosomatic condition have been proposed.

There seems to be a relation between reduced levels of nasal nitric oxide and depression/anxiety symptoms in ENS patients. Both have been shown to be reversible via implantation surgery.

It has been proposed, that the airflow in ENS is changed so that most of the air flows through the middle meatus, compared to most of the air flowing through the inferior meatus in healthy individuals. This can be corrected via inferior meatus augmentation (IMAP surgery).

== Diagnosis ==
No consensus criteria exist for the diagnosis of ENS and many ENTs will wait a year before diagnosing in hopes the patient accepts the new airflow; it is typically diagnosed by ruling out other conditions, with ENS remaining the likely diagnosis if the signs and symptoms are present. A "cotton test" has been proposed, in which moist cotton is held where a turbinate should be or in various locations in the nasal passages, to see if it provides relief and an airflow pattern that allows for natural breathing; while this has not been validated nor is it widely accepted, it may be useful to identify which people may benefit from surgery.

As of 2015, protocols for using rhinomanometry to diagnose ENS and measure response to surgery were under development, as was a standardized clinical instrument (a well defined and validated questionnaire) to obtain more useful reporting of symptoms.

A validated ENS-specific, 6-item questionnaire called the Empty Nose Syndrome 6-item Questionnaire (ENS6Q) was developed as an adjunct to the standard Sino-Nasal Outcome Test 22 (SNOT-22). The ENS6Q is the first validated, specific, adjunct questionnaire to the SNOT-22. It can more reliably identify patients suspected of ENS. The ENS6Q is gaining usage in studies on ENS.

== Classification ==
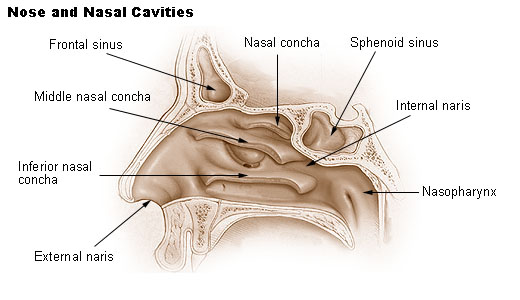
All turbinates removed – Right lateral wall view.

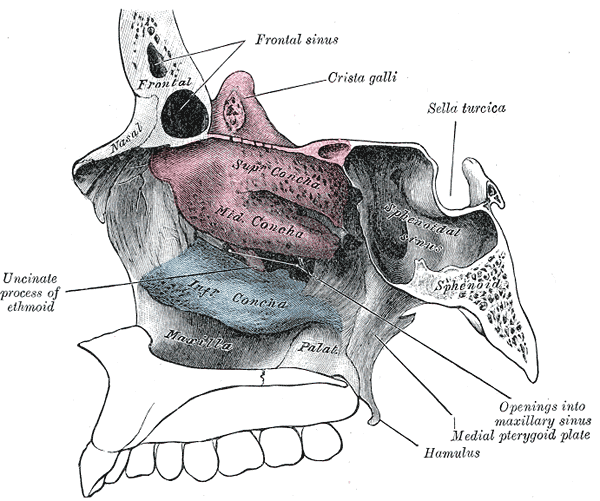
Anatomy of the nasal cavity

Four types have been proposed:

- ENS-IT: Inferior turbinate (IT) was fully or partially resected
- ENS-MT: Middle turbinate (MT) was fully or partially resected
- ENS-both: Both the IT and MT were both at least partially resected
- ENS-type: Patient appears to have adequate turbinate tissue but suffers ENS symptoms due to damage to the mucosal surface of the turbinates.

== Prevention ==
Non-surgical methods (steroid, allergy treatment) are usually attempted for an extended period of time prior to surgical intervention. In order to prevent ENS, it was suggested that unnecessary nasal surgery and surgical treatment to the turbinates and septum may be better avoided. Any proposed nasal surgery may require prior imaging of the nasal passages and an opinion from a surgeon who is familiar with ENS. It is sometimes stated that ENS is only seen after excessive turbinate reduction, but studies have shown that any surgery/procedure involving the nasal turbinates can potentially lead to ENS, for example even unilateral, partial reduction of the inferior turbinate may lead to severe ENS. People planning for surgery to the nose for function or appearance should be made aware of the risk of ENS developing if the body does not accept the new airflow and exchange of gasses.

The Haute Autorité de Sante (HAS) guidelines recommend that rhinoplasty/septoplasty shouldn't be followed immediately by any turbinate surgery. Turbinate surgery should be the last resort if medication fails. If reduced, at least two-thirds of the inferior turbinate must remain intact.

== Treatment ==
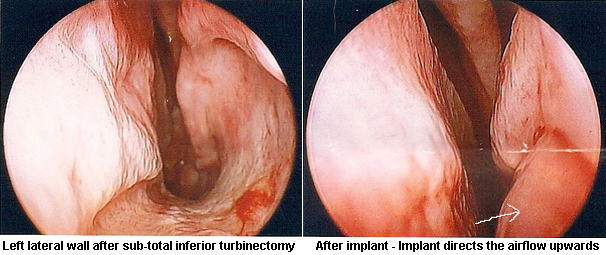
Before and after surgical restoration of the lateral wall (arrow in right-side image) to simulate the function of the missing inferior turbinate.

Initial treatment is similar to atrophic rhinitis, namely keeping the nasal mucosa moist with saline or oil-based lubricants and treating pain and infection as they arise; adding menthol to lubricants may be helpful in ENS, as may be use of a cool mist humidifier at home but has limited success and many ENT patients seek treatment from the few ENTs who specialize in ENS surgical techniques. For people with anxiety, depression, or who are obsessed with the feeling that they can't breathe, psychiatric or psychological care may be helpful.

In some people, surgery to restore missing or reduced turbinates or various fillers that correct the airflow in the nose may be beneficial. Corrective surgical methods are experimental and limited to a few ENT practitioners worldwide.

The most common surgical approach is creation of a pocket under the mucosa and implanting material. Filler materials include noncellular dermis, a medical-grade porous high-density polyethylene, or silastic. Sometimes cartilage from cows or from another part of the person's body is used. Sometimes hyaluronic acid is injected or tricalcium phosphate is used. Possible complications caused by the surgery are over-correction (causing chronic rhinosinusitis) or under correction. The hyaluronic acid may be completely resorbed after one year, or the implant may come out, but this may not affect the result if enough material remains. 21% of the people undergoing surgery for ENS have zero or only marginal improvement, but the rest report significant relief of their symptoms. Available research may suffer from placebo effect or reporting bias since none of the studies used control groups or blinding.

Stemcell treatments to improve function having been tried lack evidence from large samples and long observation. The University of Modena and Reggio Emilia is attempting to create a neo-turbinate from basal cells of the turbinate.

== Outcomes ==
Data measuring the prevalence of Empty Nose Syndrome (ENS) after turbinate surgery is limited to a few single surgeon studies with variable results. Measuring prevalence is challenging as ENS symptoms may not show up for many years after the surgery and the surgeon may no longer be following the patients. Quantifying prevalence will also depend on a valid, standardized definition.

The lack of a reliable epidemiological study or ICD-10 code makes it difficult to understand the incidence of ENS. Qualitative feedback from ENTs that treat this disease indicate that the incidence is underestimated but the condition is debilitating for those that have it.

Untreated, the condition can cause significant and long term physical and emotional distress in some people; some of the initial presentations on the condition described people who committed suicide. Research on safety and efficacy of existing treatments is limited to a handful of published studies with a small number of participants and self-reported results from specialists treating this condition.

== History ==
As early as 1914, Dr Albert Mason reported cases of "a condition resembling atrophic rhinitis" with "a dryness of the nose and throat" following turbinectomy. Mason called the turbinates "the most important organ in the nose" and claimed they were "slaughtered and removed with discriminate abandon more than any other part of the body, with the possible exception of the prepuce." He recommended that true and compensatory hypertrophy be distinguished and that the removal of septal spurs could treat the latter.

The term "Empty Nose Syndrome" was first used by Eugene Kern and Monika Stenkvist of the Mayo Clinic in 1994. Kern and Eric Moore published a case study of 242 people with secondary atrophic rhinitis in 2001 and were the first to attribute the cause to prior sinonasal surgery in the scientific literature. Whether the condition existed or not and whether surgery was a cause, was hotly debated at Nose 2000, a meeting of the International Rhinologic Society that occurs every four years, and continued to be debated thereafter at scientific meetings and in the literature; as an example of how heated the debate became, in a 2002 textbook on nasal reconstruction techniques, two surgeons from University of Utrecht called turbinectomies a "nasal crime".

== Society and culture ==
Many people with ENS symptoms commonly encounter doctors who consider their symptoms to be purely psychological. Recognition among rhinologists has been growing.

People who experience ENS have formed online communities and websites to support one another and to advocate for recognition, prevention, and treatments for ENS.

Empty nose syndrome has been a controversial topic in China. A 2017 article in Sixth Tone reported that Chinese patients with ENS symptoms were often told by doctors that the symptoms were psychological or fabricated, and that no formal support organizations existed, leaving patients to form online groups. The same article quoted an otolaryngologist who estimated that about 20% of patients who undergo turbinate reduction surgery in China develop the condition. It also reported that in 2013, Lian Enqing, who believed that nasal surgery had left him with empty nose syndrome, killed the head of the otolaryngology department at a hospital in Wenling, Zhejiang, and injured two other people.
