= Cocaine =

Tropane alkaloid and stimulant drug

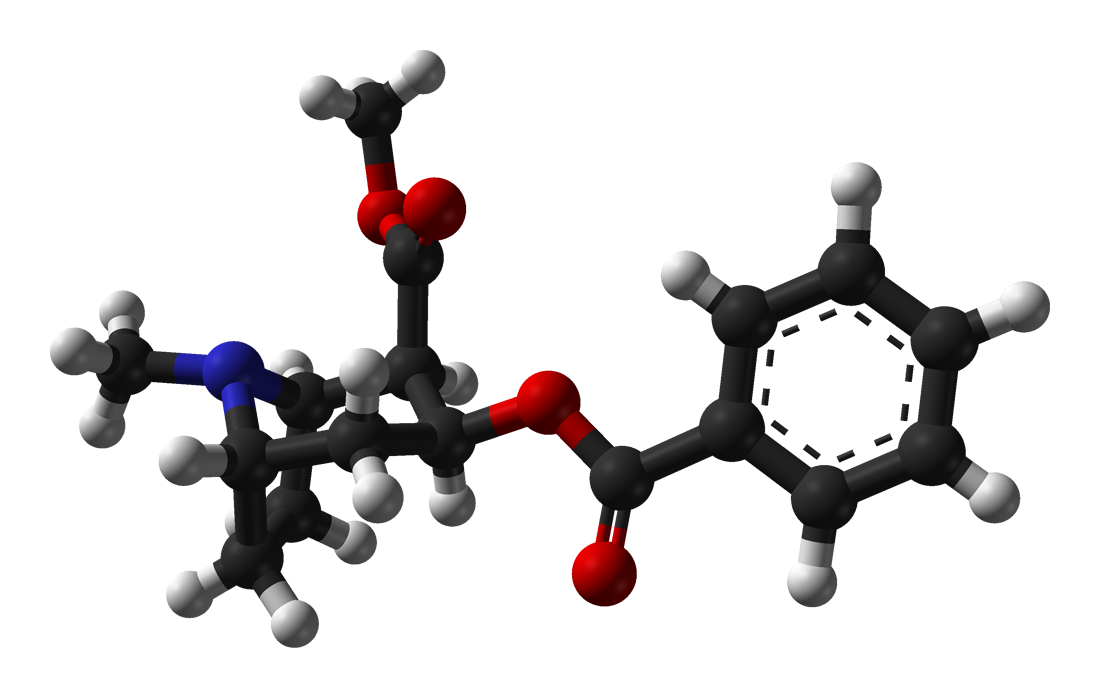

Clinical data
- Pronunciation: kə(ʊ)ˈkeɪn
- Trade names: Neurocaine, Goprelto, Numbrino, others
- Other names: Benzoylmethylecgonine
- AHFS/Drugs.com: Micromedex Detailed Consumer Information
- License data: US DailyMed: Cocaine
- Dependence liability: Physical: Low Psychological: High
- Addiction liability: High
- Routes of administration: Topical, by mouth, insufflation, intravenous, inhalation
- Drug class: Local anesthetic; SNDRI; Stimulant
- ATC code: N01BC01 (WHO) R02AD03 (WHO), S01HA01 (WHO), S02DA02 (WHO)

Legal status
- Legal status: AU: S8 (Controlled drug); BR: Class F1 (Prohibited narcotics); CA: Schedule I; DE: Anlage III (Special prescription form required); NZ: Class A; UK: Class A; US: Schedule II; UN: Narcotic Schedules I and III; SE: Förteckning II

Pharmacokinetic data
- Bioavailability: By mouth: 33%; Insufflation: 60–80%; Nasal spray: 25–43%
- Metabolism: Liver, CYP3A4
- Metabolites: Norcocaine, benzoylecgonine, cocaethylene (when consumed with alcohol)
- Onset of action: Seconds to minutes
- Elimination half-life: ~1 hour
- Duration of action: 20–90 minutes
- Excretion: Kidney

Identifiers
- IUPAC name: Methyl (1R,2R,3S,5S)-3-(benzoyloxy)-8-methyl-8-azabicyclo[3.2.1]octane-2-carboxylate
- CAS Number: 50-36-2
- PubChem CID: 446220
- IUPHAR/BPS: 2286
- DrugBank: DB00907
- ChemSpider: 10194104
- UNII: I5Y540LHVR
- KEGG: D00110
- ChEBI: CHEBI:27958
- ChEMBL: ChEMBL370805
- PDB ligand: COC (PDBe, RCSB PDB)
- CompTox Dashboard (EPA): DTXSID2038443
- ECHA InfoCard: 100.000.030

Chemical and physical data
- Formula: C_{17}H_{21}NO_{4}
- Molar mass: 303.358 g·mol^{−1}
- 3D model (JSmol): Interactive image
- Melting point: 98 °C (208 °F)
- Boiling point: 187 °C (369 °F)
- Solubility in water: 1.8g/L (22 °C)
- SMILES: CN1[C@H]2CC[C@@H]1[C@@H](C(OC)=O)[C@@H](OC(C3=CC=CC=C3)=O)C2
- InChI: InChI=1S/C17H21NO4/c1-18-12-8-9-13(18)15(17(20)21-2)14(10-12)22-16(19)11-6-4-3-5-7-11/h3-7,12-15H,8-10H2,1-2H3/t12-,13+,14-,15+/m0/s1; Key:ZPUCINDJVBIVPJ-LJISPDSOSA-N

Data page
- Cocaine (data page)

Cocaine is a central nervous system (CNS) stimulant and tropane alkaloid, derived primarily from the leaves of two coca species native to South America: Erythroxylum coca and E. novogranatense. The leaves are processed into cocaine paste, a crude mixture of coca alkaloids, from which cocaine base is isolated and then converted to cocaine hydrochloride. Although total synthesis is possible, it is complex and not used for production. Historically, cocaine was a standard topical medication used as a local anesthetic with intrinsic vasoconstrictor properties. However, its high abuse potential, adverse effects, and cost have limited its medical use and led to its replacement by alternative medicines.

Street cocaine is commonly snorted, injected, or smoked as crack cocaine; its effects last up to 90 minutes depending on the route of administration. Pharmacologically, cocaine acts as a serotonin–norepinephrine–dopamine reuptake inhibitor (SNDRI), producing reinforcing effects such as euphoria, increased alertness, concentration, libido, and reduced fatigue and appetite.

Cocaine has numerous adverse effects. Acute use can cause vasoconstriction, tachycardia, hypertension, hyperthermia, or seizures, while overdose may lead to stroke, heart attack, or sudden cardiac death. It also produces a spectrum of psychiatric symptoms, including agitation, paranoia, anxiety, irritability, psychosis, hallucinations, delusions, violence, and suicidal or homicidal thinking. Prenatal exposure poses risks to fetal development. Chronic use may result in cocaine dependence, withdrawal symptoms, neurotoxicity, and nasal damage, including cocaine-induced midline destructive lesions.

Coca cultivation and initial processing occur primarily in Latin America, especially in the Andes regions of Bolivia, Peru, and Colombia. Cultivation is expanding into Central America, including Honduras, Guatemala, and Belize. Violence linked to the cocaine trade continues to affect Latin America and the Caribbean and is expanding into Western Europe, Asia, and Africa as transnational organized crime groups compete globally. Cocaine remains the world's fastest-growing illicit drug market.

Coca chewing dates back at least 8,000 years in South America. Large-scale cultivation occurred in Taiwan and Java prior to World War II. The cocaine boom—a sharp rise in illegal production and trade—began in the late 1970s and peaked in the 1980s. Cocaine is regulated under international drug control conventions, though its legal status varies nationally: several countries have decriminalized possession of small quantities.

== Uses ==
Coca leaves have been used by Andean civilizations since ancient times. In ancient Wari culture, Inca culture, and through modern successor indigenous cultures of the Andes Mountains, coca leaves are chewed, taken orally in the form of a tea, or alternatively, prepared in a sachet wrapped around alkaline burnt ashes, and held in the mouth against the inner cheek; it has traditionally been used as an anorectic and to combat the effects of cold and altitude sickness, although its actual effectiveness has never been systematically studied.

Globally, in 2019, cocaine was used by an estimated 20 million people (0.4% of adults aged 15 to 64 years). The highest prevalence of cocaine use was in Australia and New Zealand (2.1%), followed by North America (2.1%), Western and Central Europe (1.4%), and South and Central America (1.0%). Since 1961, the Single Convention on Narcotic Drugs has required countries to make recreational use of cocaine a crime. In the United States, cocaine is regulated as a Schedule II drug under the Controlled Substances Act, meaning that it has a high potential for abuse but has an accepted medical use. While rarely used medically anymore, its accepted uses include serving as a topical local anesthetic for the upper respiratory tract and as an antihemorrhagic agent to stop bleeding in the mouth, throat, and nasal cavities.

=== Traditional medicine ===
==== Coca leaves ====
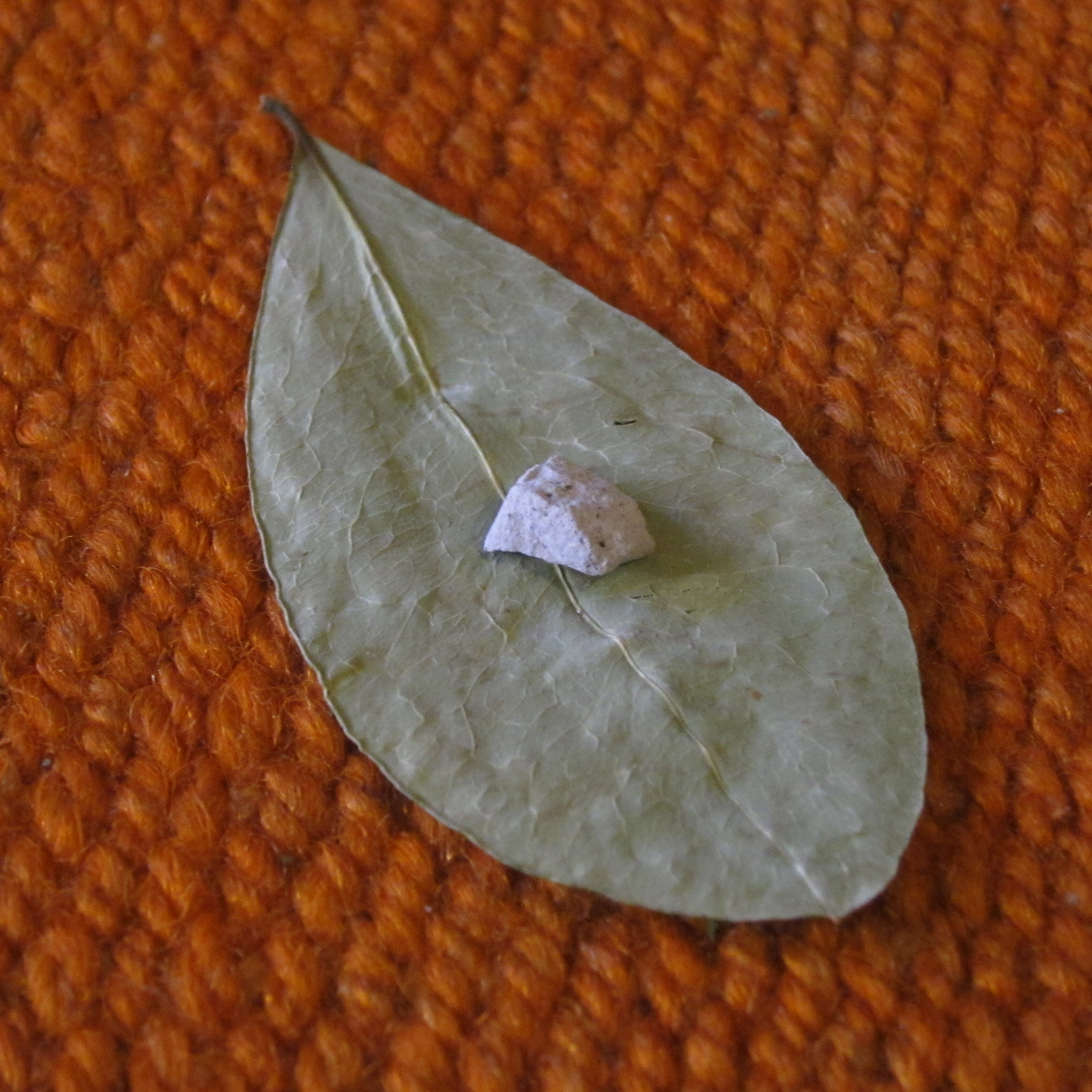
Llipta is used to improve extraction when chewing coca (Museo de la Coca, Cusco, Peru).

It is legal to use coca leaves in the Andean Community, such as Peru and Bolivia, and Argentina, where they are chewed, consumed as tea, or sometimes incorporated into food products. Coca leaves are typically mixed with an alkaline substance (such as slaked lime) and chewed into a wad that is retained in the buccal pouch (mouth between gum and cheek, much the same as chewing tobacco is chewed) and sucked of its juices. The juices are absorbed slowly by the mucous membrane of the inner cheek and by the gastrointestinal tract when swallowed.

===== Coca tea =====
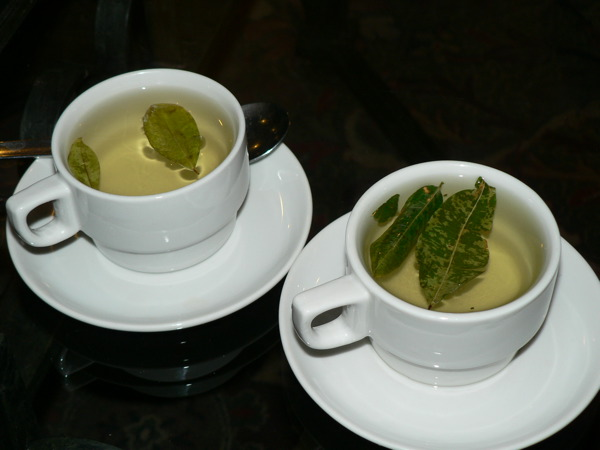
Two cups of coca tea

Coca herbal infusion (also referred to as coca tea) is used in coca-leaf producing countries much as any herbal medicinal infusion would elsewhere in the world. The free and legal commercialization of dried coca leaves under the form of filtration bags to be used as "coca tea" has been actively promoted by the governments of Peru and Bolivia for many years as a drink having medicinal powers. In Peru, the National Coca Company, a state-run corporation, sells cocaine-infused teas and other medicinal products and also exports leaves to the U.S. for medicinal use. The effects of drinking coca tea are mild stimulation and mood lift.

In 1986 an article in the Journal of the American Medical Association revealed that U.S. health food stores were selling dried coca leaves to be prepared as an infusion as "Health Inca Tea". While the packaging claimed it had been "decocainized", no such process had actually taken place. The article stated that drinking two cups of the tea per day gave a mild stimulation, increased heart rate, and mood elevation, and the tea was essentially harmless.

===== Ypadu =====
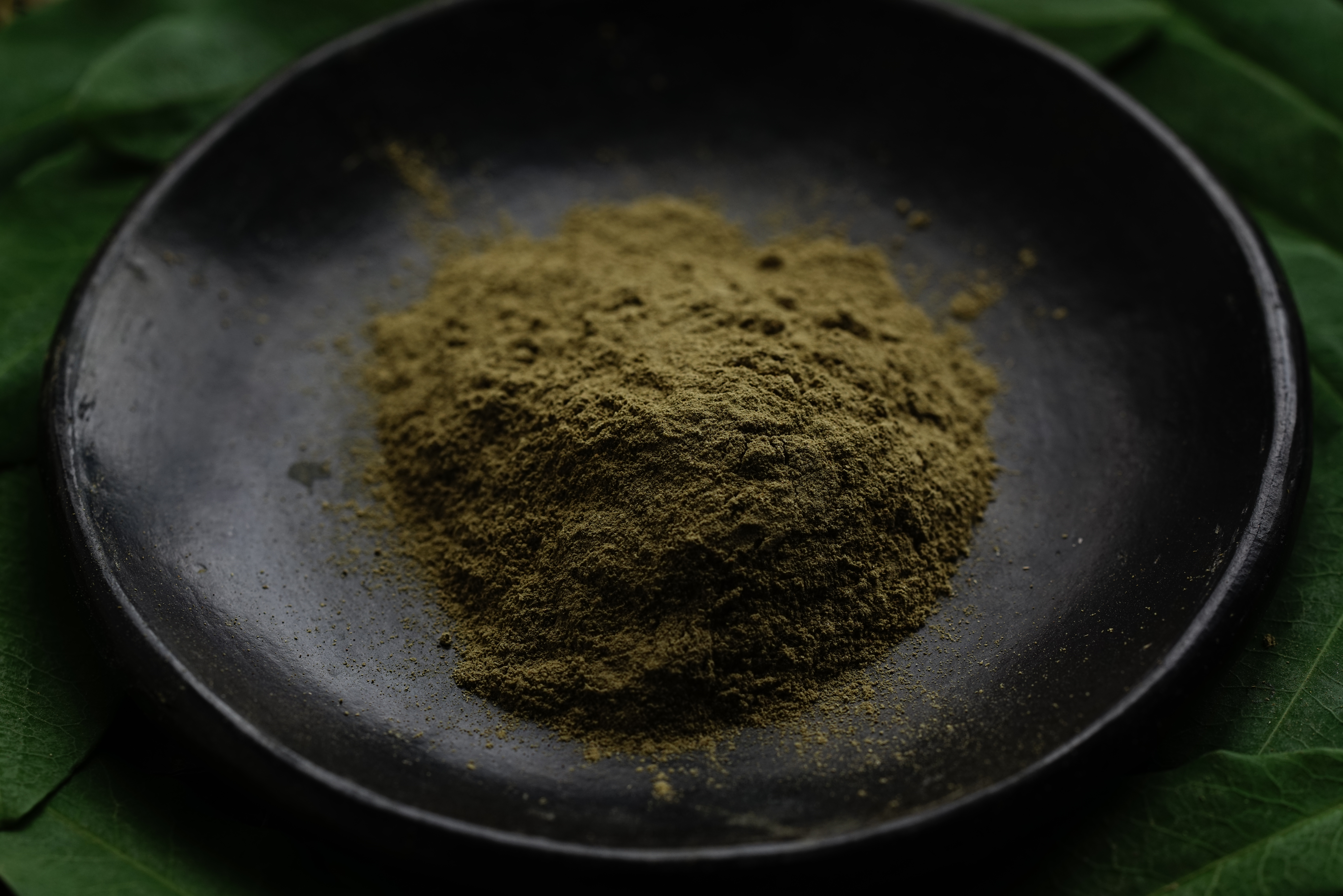
Mambe or ypadu is made from toasted and ground coca leaves with ashes

Ypadú or ypadu (also known as mambé) is an unrefined, unconcentrated powder made from toasted coca leaves and the ash of various other plants. It is traditionally prepared and consumed by indigenous tribes in the Northwest Amazon. Like coca teas consumed in Peru to adapt to sickness induced by high elevation, it has a long ethnobotanical history and cultural associations.

=== Medical ===
Karl Koller's groundbreaking discovery of cocaine as a local anesthetic is regarded as the second most significant advance in the history of anesthesia. Although cocaine was once widely preferred for topical anesthesia, the search for replacement agents intensified due to rising costs, strict regulations, and its habit-forming potential. Cocaine is not included on the WHO Model List of Essential Medicines; the list formally excludes "cocaine and its combinations" as therapeutic alternatives to ophthalmological preparations.

The US Drug Enforcement Administration (DEA) classifies cocaine as a Schedule II drug, recognizing its high potential for abuse but still permitting its limited use for medical purposes. However, current pharmacoepidemiological trends suggest that cocaine may soon reach the point where, in practical terms, it is no longer used medically in health care as a Schedule II substance. As physician boards—but not pharmacy boards—continue to assess knowledge of licit cocaine, attention may shift toward drugs with more contemporary medical use.

Cocaine is rarely prescribed in modern medicine due to its high potential for abuse and significant risk of adverse effects; its use is almost exclusively limited to health facilities for specific diagnostic procedures or surgeries.

==== Topical ====
Cocaine is used in medical practice as a topical medication. Because it is not absorbed into the bloodstream in significant amounts when used this way, topical application does not produce the psychoactive effects associated with recreational cocaine use.

===== Topical anesthetic =====
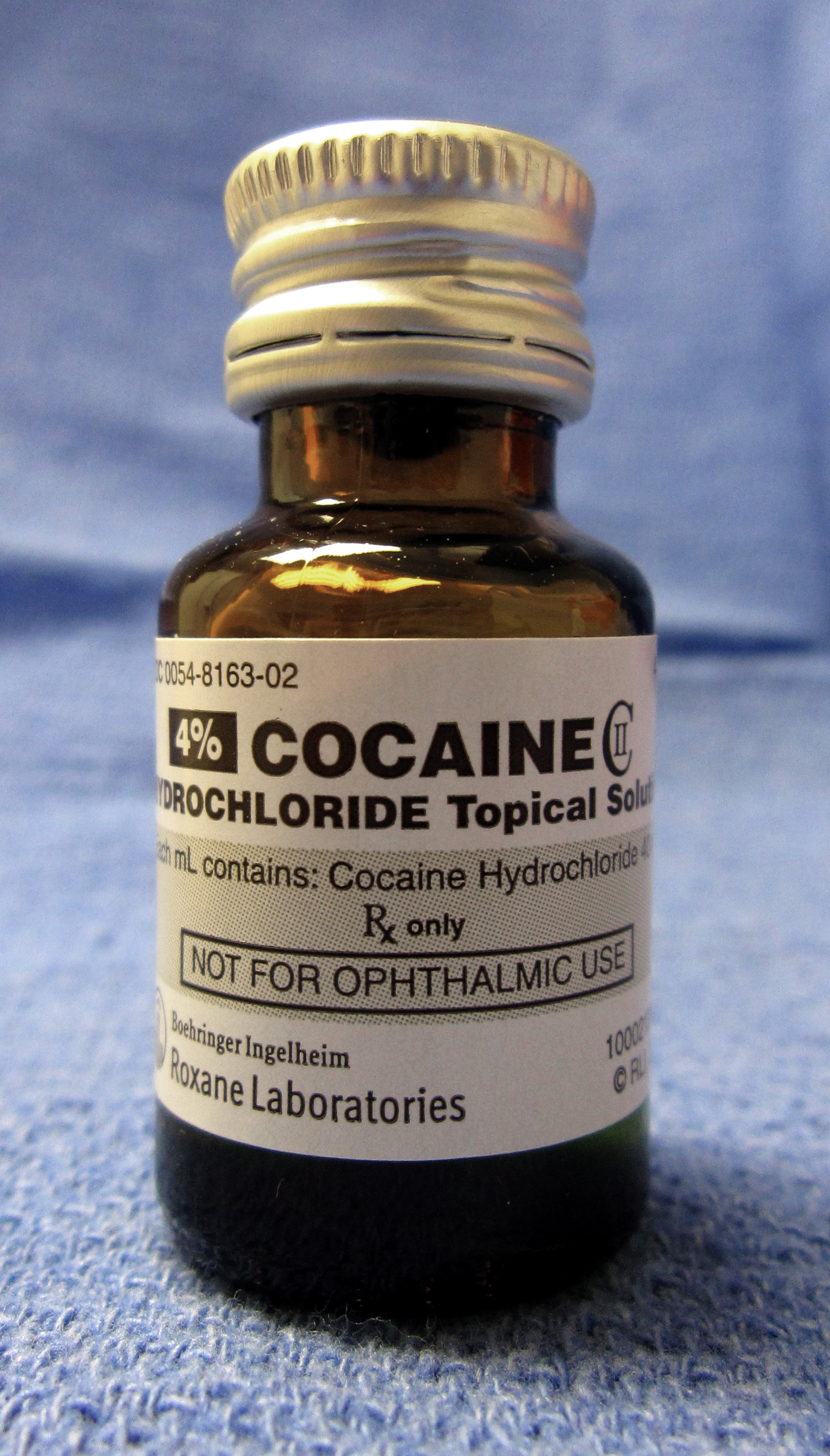
Cocaine hydrochloride

Cocaine is sometimes used in otorhinolaryngology as a topical anesthetic and vasoconstrictor to help control pain and bleeding during surgery of the nose, mouth, throat, or lacrimal duct. It is also used for topical airway anaesthesia for procedures such as awake fibreoptic bronchoscopy or intubation. Although some absorption and systemic effects may occur, the use of cocaine as a topical anesthetic and vasoconstrictor is generally safe, rarely causing cardiovascular toxicity, glaucoma, and pupil dilation. Occasionally, cocaine is mixed with adrenaline and sodium bicarbonate and used topically for surgery, a formulation called Moffett's solution. It is occasionally used in surgeries involving the pharynx or nasopharynx to reduce pain, bleeding, and vocal cord spasm.

Nasal solution cocaine hydrochloride (Goprelto), an ester used for intranasal application, was approved for medical use in the United States in December 2017, and is indicated for the introduction of topical anesthesia of the mucous membranes for diagnostic procedures and surgeries on or through the nasal cavities of adults. Cocaine hydrochloride (Numbrino) was approved for medical use in the United States in January 2020. Headache and epistaxis are the most frequently reported adverse reactions with Goprelto, while hypertension and tachycardia-including sinus tachycardia-are most common with Numbrino.

===== Ophthalmological use =====
Cocaine eye drops have traditionally been used by neurologists when examining people suspected of having Horner syndrome. In Horner syndrome, sympathetic innervation to the eye is blocked. In a healthy eye, cocaine stimulates the sympathetic nervous system (SNS) by inhibiting norepinephrine reuptake, causing the pupil to dilate. In patients with Horner syndrome, sympathetic innervation to the eye is disrupted, so the affected pupil does not dilate in response to cocaine and remains constricted, or dilates to a lesser extent than the unaffected eye, which also receives the eye drop test. If both eyes dilate equally, the patient does not have Horner syndrome.

However, apraclonidine has largely replaced cocaine as the first-line pharmacologic agent for the diagnosis of Horner syndrome in routine clinical practice.

=== Recreational ===
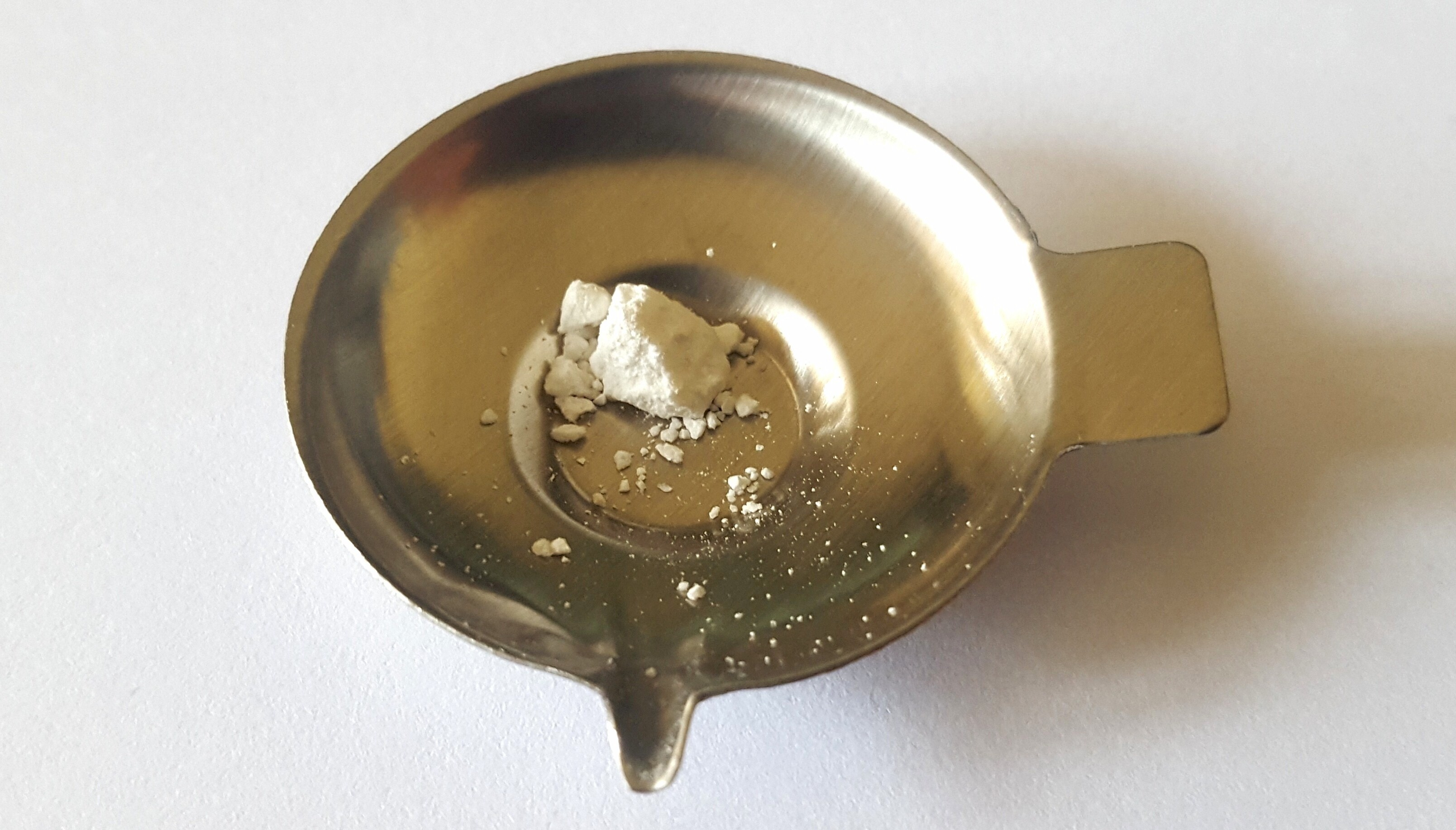
Peruvian flake cocaine on a metal milligram scale tray

Recreational cocaine is typically not taken by mouth due to its poor bioavailability, instead it is usually snorted or injected. Cocaine hydrochloride can also be chemically converted into its free base form, crack cocaine, which can be vaporized.

Cocaine is a central nervous system stimulant. Its effects can last from 15 minutes to an hour. The duration of cocaine's effects depends on the amount taken and the route of administration. Cocaine can be in the form of fine white powder and has a bitter taste. Crack cocaine is a smokeable form of cocaine made into small "rocks" by processing cocaine with sodium bicarbonate (baking soda) and water.

Cocaine use leads to increases in alertness, feelings of well-being and euphoria, increased energy and motor activity, and increased feelings of competence and sexuality.

Analysis of the correlation between the use of 18 various psychoactive substances shows that cocaine use correlates with the use of other "party drugs" (e.g., MDMA, amphetamine), as well as with heroin and benzodiazepines use, and can be considered as a bridge between the use of different groups of drugs.

==== Insufflation ====
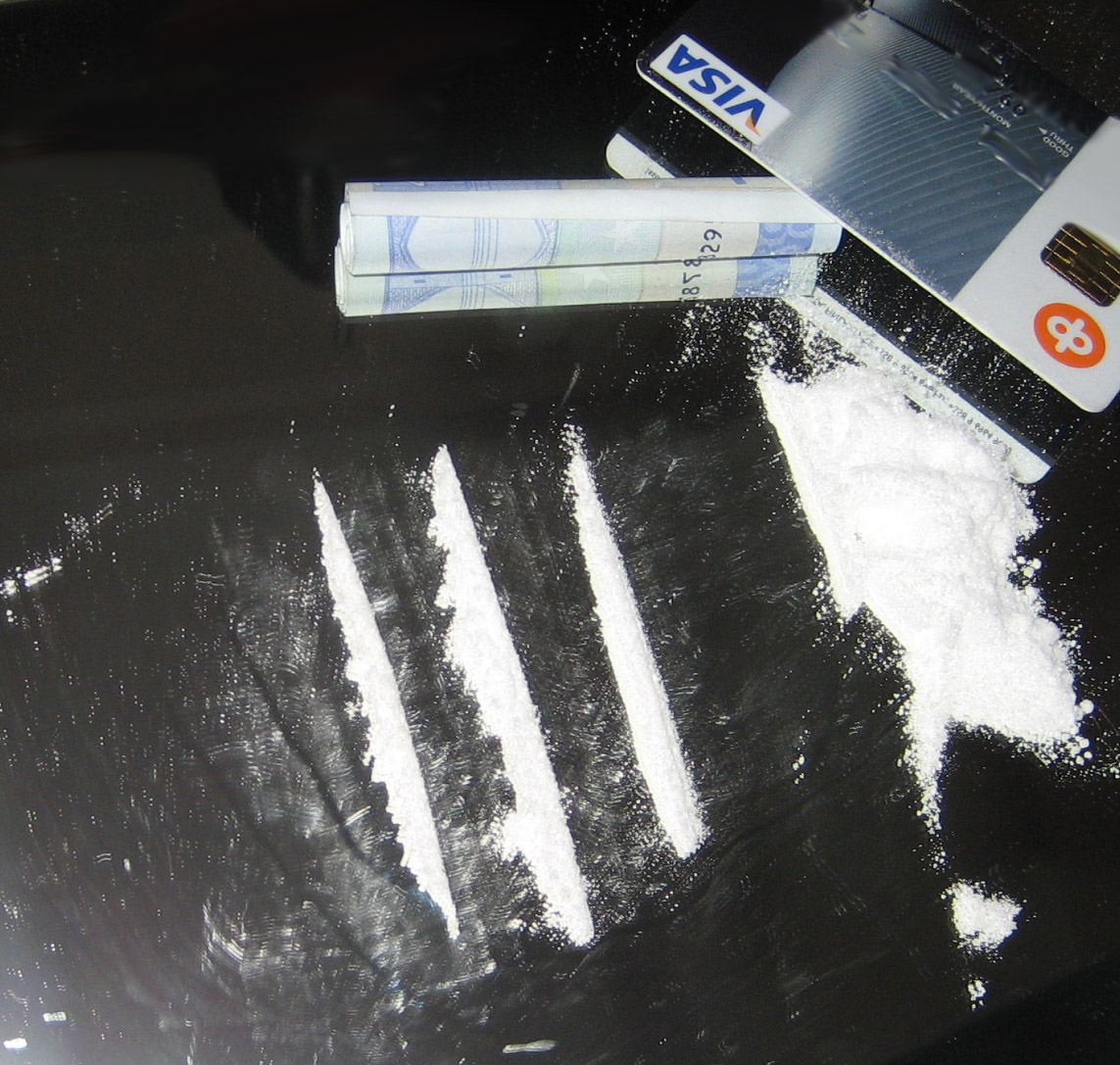
Lines of cocaine prepared for snorting. Contaminated currency such as banknotes might serve as a fomite of diseases like hepatitis C.

Nasal insufflation (known colloquially as "snorting", "sniffing", or "blowing") is a common method of ingestion of recreational powdered cocaine. The drug coats and is absorbed through the mucous membranes lining the nasal passages. Cocaine's desired euphoric effects are delayed when snorted through the nose by about five minutes. This occurs because cocaine's absorption is slowed by its constricting effect on the blood vessels of the nose. Insufflation of cocaine also leads to the longest duration of its effects (60–90 minutes). When insufflating cocaine, absorption through the nasal membranes is approximately 30–60%

Most banknotes have traces of cocaine on them; this has been confirmed by studies done in several countries. In 1994, the US 9th Circuit Court of Appeals cited findings that in Los Angeles, three out of four banknotes were tainted by cocaine or another illicit drug.

Snuff spoons, hollowed-out pens, cut straws, pointed ends of keys, long fingernails or artificial nails, and tampon applicators are also used to insufflate cocaine. The cocaine typically is poured onto a flat, hard surface and divided into "bumps", "lines", or "rails", and then insufflated. A 2001 study reported that the sharing of straws used to "snort" cocaine can spread blood diseases such as hepatitis C.

===== Cocaine spoon =====
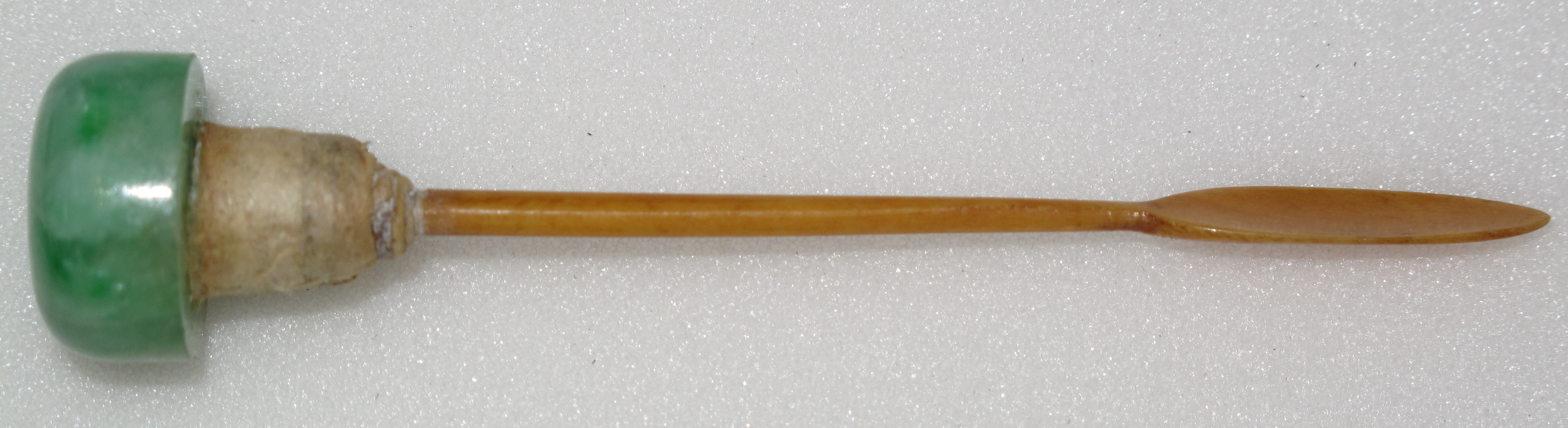
Chinese snuff bottle stopper with a spoon

Historically, snuff spoons were used for cocaine in the 20th century, hence the names "cocaine spoon" and "coke spoon". Some local statutes in the US treat spoons that are too small and thus "unsuited for the typical, lawful uses of a spoon" as drug paraphernalia.

==== Injection ====
Subjective effects not commonly shared with other methods of administration include a ringing in the ears moments after injection (usually when over 120 milligrams) lasting 2 to 5 minutes including tinnitus and audio distortion. This is colloquially referred to as a "bell ringer". In a study of cocaine users, the average time taken to reach peak subjective effects was 3.1 minutes. The euphoria passes quickly. Aside from the toxic effects of cocaine, there is also the danger of circulatory emboli from the insoluble substances that may be used to cut the drug. As with all injected illicit substances, there is a risk of the user contracting blood-borne infections if sterile injecting equipment is not available or used.

==== Inhalation ====
===== Cocaine paste =====
Coca paste (paco, basuco, oxi, pasta) is a crude extract of the coca leaf which contains 40% to 91% cocaine freebase along with companion coca alkaloids and varying quantities of benzoic acid, methanol, and kerosene. The caustic reactions associated with the local application of coca paste prevents its use by oral, intranasal, mucosal, intramuscular, intravenous or subcutaneous routes. Coca paste can only be smoked when combined with a combustible material such as tobacco or cannabis.

Crude cocaine preparation intermediates are marketed as cheaper alternatives to pure cocaine to local markets while the more expensive end product is exported to United States and European markets. Freebase cocaine paste preparations can be smoked. The psychological and physiological effects of the paco are quite severe. Media usually report that it is extremely toxic and addictive. According to a study by Intercambios, media appear to exaggerate the effects of paco. These stereotypes create a sense that nothing can be done to help a paco addict and thus stand in the way of rehabilitation programs.

===== Crack cocaine =====
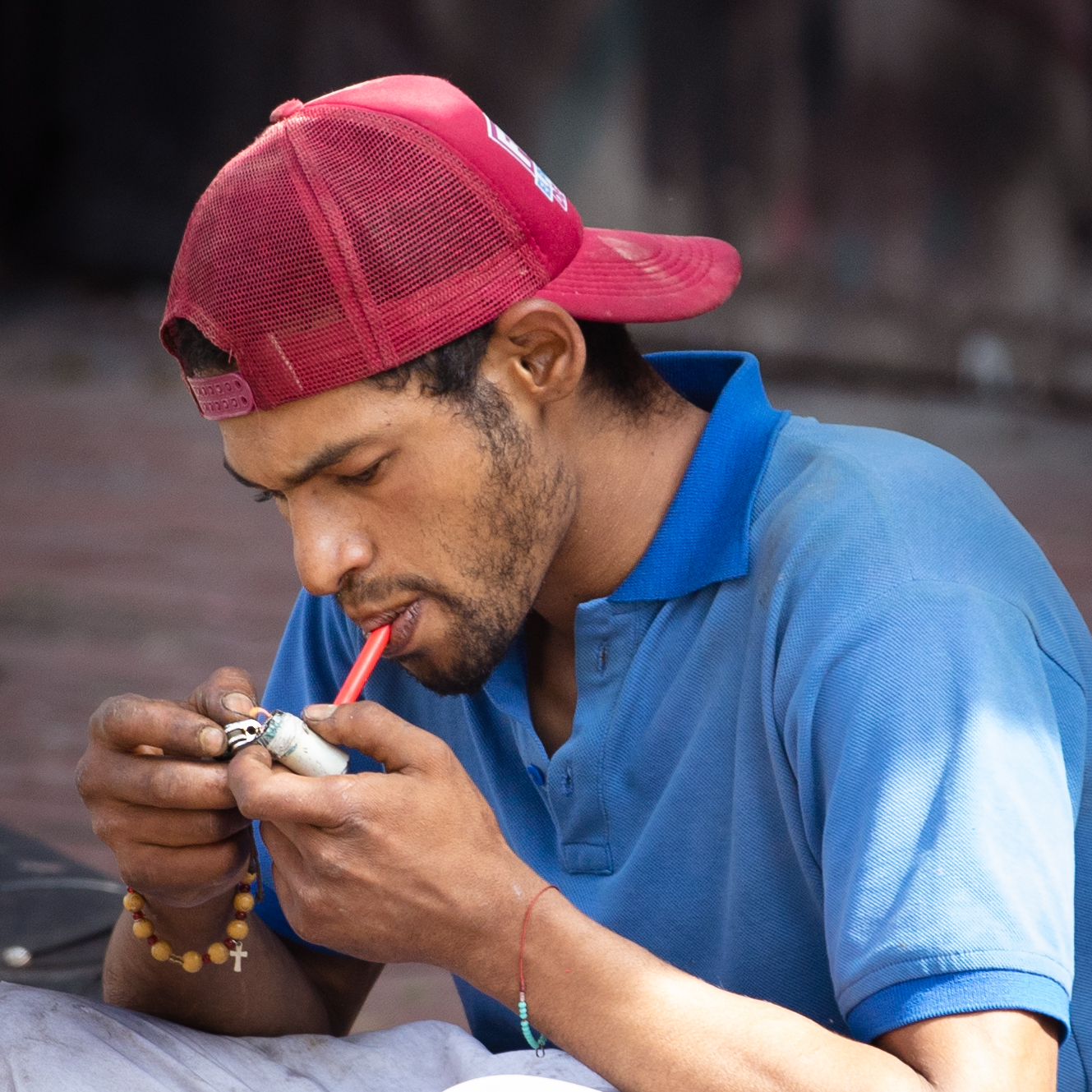
Man smoking crack cocaine in Bogotá, Colombia

Powder cocaine (cocaine hydrochloride) must be heated to a high temperature to be smoked (about 197 °C), and considerable decomposition/burning occurs at these high temperatures. This effectively destroys some of the cocaine and yields a sharp, acrid, and foul-tasting smoke. Cocaine base/crack can be smoked because it vaporizes with little or no decomposition at 98 °C (208 °F).

== Contraindications ==
Cocaine should not be used in individuals with a known allergy or hypersensitivity to the drug or any components of its topical formulation. It is also contraindicated in elderly patients and those with a history of hypertension or cardiovascular disease.

=== Pregnancy ===
Prenatal cocaine exposure (PCE) may occur when a pregnant woman uses cocaine.

Under the former FDA pregnancy category system, cocaine was classified as a Category C drug. Its potential to cause harm to the fetus is not fully known, so it should only be administered to pregnant women if clearly necessary.

Cocaine can act as a teratogen, having various effects on the developing fetus. Some common teratogenic defects caused by cocaine include hydronephrosis, cleft palate, polydactyly, and down syndrome. Cocaine as a drug has a low molecular weight and high water and lipid solubility which enables it to cross the placenta and fetal blood-brain barrier. Because cocaine is able to pass through the placenta and enter the fetus, the fetus' circulation can be negatively affected. With restriction of fetal circulation, the development of organs in the fetus can be impacted, even resulting in intestines developing outside of the fetus' body. Cocaine use during pregnancy can also result in obstetric labor complications such as, placental abruption, preterm birth or delivery, uterine rupture, miscarriage, and stillbirth. Prenatal cocaine exposure may cause subtle cognitive deficits and lower the chance of above-average IQ by age 4, but supportive caregiving can significantly improve outcomes.

=== Breastfeeding ===
Mothers utilizing recreational drugs, such as cocaine, methamphetamines, PCP, and heroin, should not breastfeed.

The March of Dimes said "it is likely that cocaine will reach the baby through breast milk," and advises the following regarding cocaine use during pregnancy:

Cocaine use during pregnancy can affect a pregnant woman and her unborn baby in many ways. During the early months of pregnancy, it may increase the risk of miscarriage. Later in pregnancy, it can trigger preterm labor (labor that occurs before 37 weeks of pregnancy) or cause the baby to grow poorly. As a result, cocaine-exposed babies are more likely than unexposed babies to be born with low birth weight (less than 5.5 lb or 2.5 kg). Low-birthweight babies are 20 times more likely to die in their first month of life than normal-weight babies, and face an increased risk of lifelong disabilities such as mental retardation and cerebral palsy. Cocaine-exposed babies also tend to have smaller heads, which generally reflect smaller brains. Some studies suggest that cocaine-exposed babies are at increased risk of birth defects, including urinary tract defects and, possibly, heart defects. Cocaine also may cause an unborn baby to have a stroke, irreversible brain injury, or a myocardial infarction.

== Side effects ==
=== Heart ===
Cocaine use can cause serious heart problems like sudden death, heart inflammation, arrhythmias, and heart attacks. It triggers coronary artery spasms, increases blood clot risk, and accelerates atherosclerosis, especially with long-term use. The severity of heart disease often relates to how long and how often cocaine is used. It can also become a serious risk at high doses due to cocaine's blocking effect on cardiac sodium channels.

=== Mortality ===
Death rates cocaine

Persons with regular or problematic use of cocaine have a significantly higher mortality rate, and are specifically at higher risk of traumatic deaths and deaths attributable to infectious disease. In 2025, the Liberty House Clinic in the United Kingdom noted that chronic cocaine usage in fact had a higher risk of death than alcoholism.

=== Neurotoxicity ===
Cocaine is considered neurotoxic due to its damaging effects on the brain and nervous system. Research has shown that both acute and chronic cocaine use can lead to significant reductions in cerebral blood flow, disrupt neurovascular interactions, and impair brain function. These changes are associated with nerve injury, cognitive deficits, and an increased risk of cerebrovascular accidents such as strokes. Brain imaging studies consistently report that individuals who misuse cocaine exhibit structural and functional abnormalities compared to non-users, supporting the classification of cocaine as a neurotoxic substance.

Cocaine use damages gray matter in brain regions critical for memory, attention, and emotion, leading to cognitive and behavioral impairments. It also disrupts dopamine levels and blood flow, accelerating brain aging and causing long-term neurological harm.

=== Psychiatric symptoms ===
Cocaine produces a spectrum of psychiatric symptoms including agitation, paranoia, anxiety, irritability, psychosis, hallucinations, delusions, violence, as well as suicidal and homicidal thinking.

A substantial proportion of cocaine addicts exhibit hypomanic personality traits that are ego-syntonic with their pattern of cocaine abuse.

Cocaine intoxication mirrors core traits of narcissism—both involve a dopamine-driven, compulsive drive for reward. Just as cocaine produces a brief high that temporarily enhances the sense of worth, narcissists rely on external admiration to feed an addiction to their self-esteem, resulting in a self-reinforcing feedback cycle.

The misuse of cocaine has a high correlation with suicide. In those who use cocaine, the risk is greatest during the withdrawal phase. Cocaine use has been linked to homicide, with up to 31% of homicide victims testing positive for the drug. In 1989 Fulton County, 40% of homicide victims had cocaine metabolites, especially Black and firearm victims.

A 2020 study found that men with cocaine use disorder have greater difficulty identifying emotional expression in female faces, affecting relationships and suggesting a target for intervention. A 2021 study found that cocaine use disorder impairs emotion recognition, especially for happiness and fear, with improvement after long-term abstinence.

Depression is modestly linked to current drug use in cocaine users but does not clearly predict treatment participation or future use. For people who use cocaine, stress and craving can make each other worse. This may help explain why stress can lead to relapse in people trying to stop using cocaine.

==== Psychosis ====
Cocaine has a similar potential to induce temporary psychosis with more than half of cocaine abusers reporting at least some psychotic symptoms at some point. Typical symptoms include paranoid delusions that they are being followed and that their drug use is being watched, accompanied by hallucinations that support the delusional beliefs. Delusional parasitosis with formication ('cocaine bugs') is also a fairly common symptom.

Cocaine-induced psychosis shows sensitization toward the psychotic effects of the drug. This means that psychosis becomes more severe with repeated intermittent use.

=== Short-term effects ===
Insufflating (snorting) cocaine commonly causes increased mucus production due to irritation and inflammation of the nasal passages. This irritation leads to symptoms such as a runny nose, nasal congestion, and excessive or thickened mucus.

Acute exposure to cocaine has many effects on humans, including euphoria, increases in heart rate and blood pressure, and increases in cortisol secretion from the adrenal gland. In humans with acute exposure followed by continuous exposure to cocaine at a constant blood concentration, the acute tolerance to the chronotropic cardiac effects of cocaine begins after about 10 minutes, while acute tolerance to the euphoric effects of cocaine begins after about one hour. With excessive or prolonged use, the drug can cause itching, fast heart rate, and paranoid delusions or sensations of insects crawling on the skin. Cocaine can induce psychosis characterized by paranoia, impaired reality testing, hallucinations, irritability, and physical aggression. Cocaine intoxication can cause hyperawareness, hypervigilance, psychomotor agitation, and delirium. Consumption of large doses of cocaine can cause violent outbursts, especially by those with preexisting psychosis. Acute exposure may induce arrhythmia, including atrial fibrillation, supraventricular tachycardia, ventricular tachycardia, and ventricular fibrillation. Acute exposure may also lead to angina, heart attack, and congestive heart failure. Cocaine overdose may cause seizures, abnormally high body temperature and a marked elevation of blood pressure, which can be life-threatening, abnormal heart rhythms, and death. Anxiety, paranoia, and restlessness can also occur, especially during the comedown. With excessive dosage, tremors, convulsions, and increased body temperature are observed.

=== Long-term effects ===
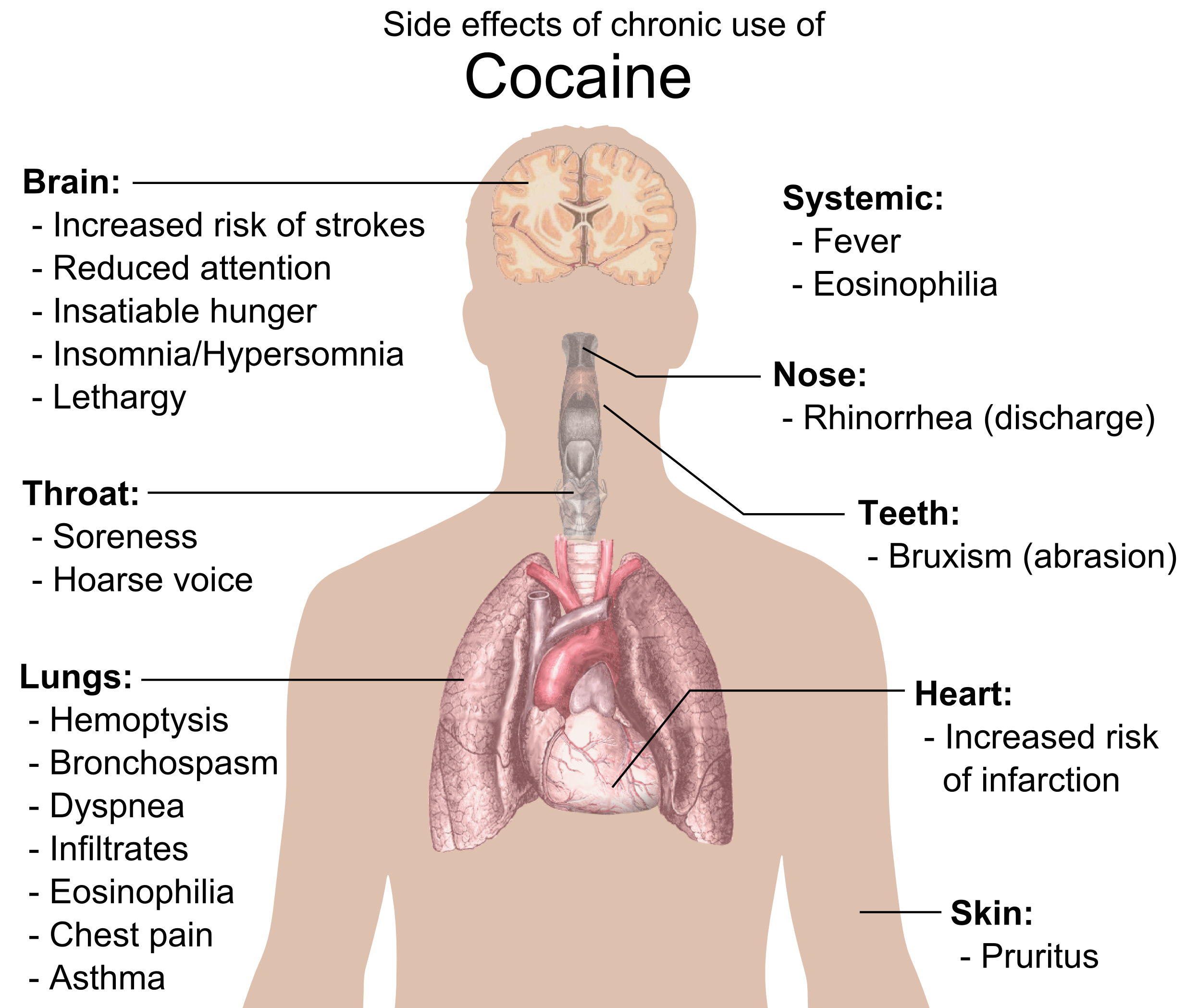
Side effects of chronic cocaine use

Cocaine is highly addictive and has poor bioavailability when taken orally. Individuals often engage in repeated use by either insufflating it intranasally or converting it to crack cocaine for vaporization. Cocaine's effects last longest when insufflated (60–90 minutes), but the drug itself has a short biological half-life of about 0.7–1.5 hours. Repeated use raises the risk of developing "cocaine nose," referring to severe nasal tissue damage from intranasal use, as well as "crack lung," a condition involving lung tissue damage caused by inhaling crack cocaine.

Cocaine use leads to an increased risk of hemorrhagic and ischemic strokes. Cocaine use also increases the risk of having a heart attack.

Cocaine use also promotes the formation of blood clots. This increase in blood clot formation is attributed to cocaine-associated increases in the activity of plasminogen activator inhibitor, and an increase in the number, activation, and aggregation of platelets.

Cocaine constricts blood vessels, dilates pupils, and increases body temperature, heart rate, and blood pressure. It can also cause headaches and gastrointestinal complications such as abdominal pain and nausea. Chronic users may lose their appetite and experience severe malnutrition, leading to being underweight.

A 2014 study found that increased cocaine use is linked to greater cognitive impairment, particularly in working memory, while reduced or ceased use can lead to partial or full recovery of cognitive function. These findings suggest that some cocaine-related cognitive deficits are reversible, especially if use begins later in life. A 2018 review found little evidence that chronic cocaine use causes widespread cognitive impairment. Exposure to cocaine may lead to the breakdown of the blood–brain barrier.

Cocaine use is frequently associated with involuntary tooth grinding, known as bruxism, which can cause dental attrition and gingivitis. Additionally, stimulants like cocaine, methamphetamine, and even caffeine cause dehydration and dry mouth.

==== Addiction ====
Cocaine can induce tolerance after a single dose, and repeated use frequently leads to the development of addiction and prolonged craving. Assessment tools like the Obsessive Compulsive Cocaine Use Scale (OCCUS) may be employed to quantify obsessive and compulsive thoughts related to cocaine consumption.

Withdrawal symptoms include disrupted sleep, irritability, depression, and reduced ability to experience pleasure (anhedonia). Chronic nasal use may cause destructive damage to the nasal septum, including cocaine-induced midline destructive lesions (CIMDL). Illicit cocaine is frequently adulterated with substances such as fentanyl, levamisole, or local anesthetics, increasing its toxicity. Concurrent use with alcohol produces cocaethylene, a metabolite that significantly increases the risk of sudden death. According to the Global Burden of Disease Study, cocaine use is responsible for approximately 7,300 deaths annually.

Cocaine abuse can trigger addiction-related structural neuroplasticity in the human brain, although the permanence of such changes remains uncertain. Family history is a known risk factor, as relatives of cocaine users have an increased likelihood of developing cocaine addiction.

A key mechanism involves the overexpression of ΔFosB in the nucleus accumbens, altering transcriptional regulation and reinforcing drug-seeking behavior. Each dose of cocaine raises ΔFosB levels without a known saturation point. This elevation leads to increased brain-derived neurotrophic factor (BDNF) levels, which in turn enhance dendritic branching and spine density in neurons of the nucleus accumbens and prefrontal cortex, potentially persisting for weeks after drug cessation. In transgenic mice engineered to express ΔFosB in the nucleus accumbens and dorsal striatum, heightened behavioral sensitization to cocaine has been observed. These mice self-administer cocaine at lower doses and display a greater propensity for relapse after withdrawal ΔFosB also enhances sensitivity to reward by upregulating the AMPA receptor subunit GluR2 and downregulating the expression of dynorphin.

Cocaine use has also been shown to increase DNA damage in the brains of rodents. During subsequent DNA repair, enduring alterations in chromatin structure may arise, such as DNA methylation and methylation or acetylation of histones at the repair loci. These modifications may result in lasting epigenetic "scars", which are believed to contribute to the persistent epigenetic changes observed in cocaine addiction.

==== Dependence and withdrawal ====
Cocaine dependence develops after even brief periods of regular cocaine use.

About 25% of adults with attention deficit hyperactivity disorder (ADHD) use cocaine, and 10% develop a cocaine use disorder during their lifetime. Because cocaine use can worsen health outcomes, adults with ADHD should be screened for cocaine use disorder and referred for treatment if needed.

Cocaine-dependent patients with high neuroticism scores are more likely to experience cocaine-induced psychotic symptoms, regardless of other drug use factors, making personality assessment important for risk identification and patient warning.

Cocaine withdrawal symptoms group into two types: depressive (e.g., depression, craving, insomnia) and somatic (e.g., increased appetite, fatigue). Depressive symptoms are linked to worse outcomes like longer depression, treatment, and risky behaviors.

===== Treatment =====
Because there are no medications with an approved indication for cocaine use disorder, psychosocial treatments are the current standard. Effective approaches include group and individual counseling, cognitive behavioral therapy (CBT), and motivational interviewing (MI). Contingency management (CM)—which rewards patients with vouchers for meeting treatment goals—has proven especially effective, particularly for helping patients achieve initial abstinence from cocaine.

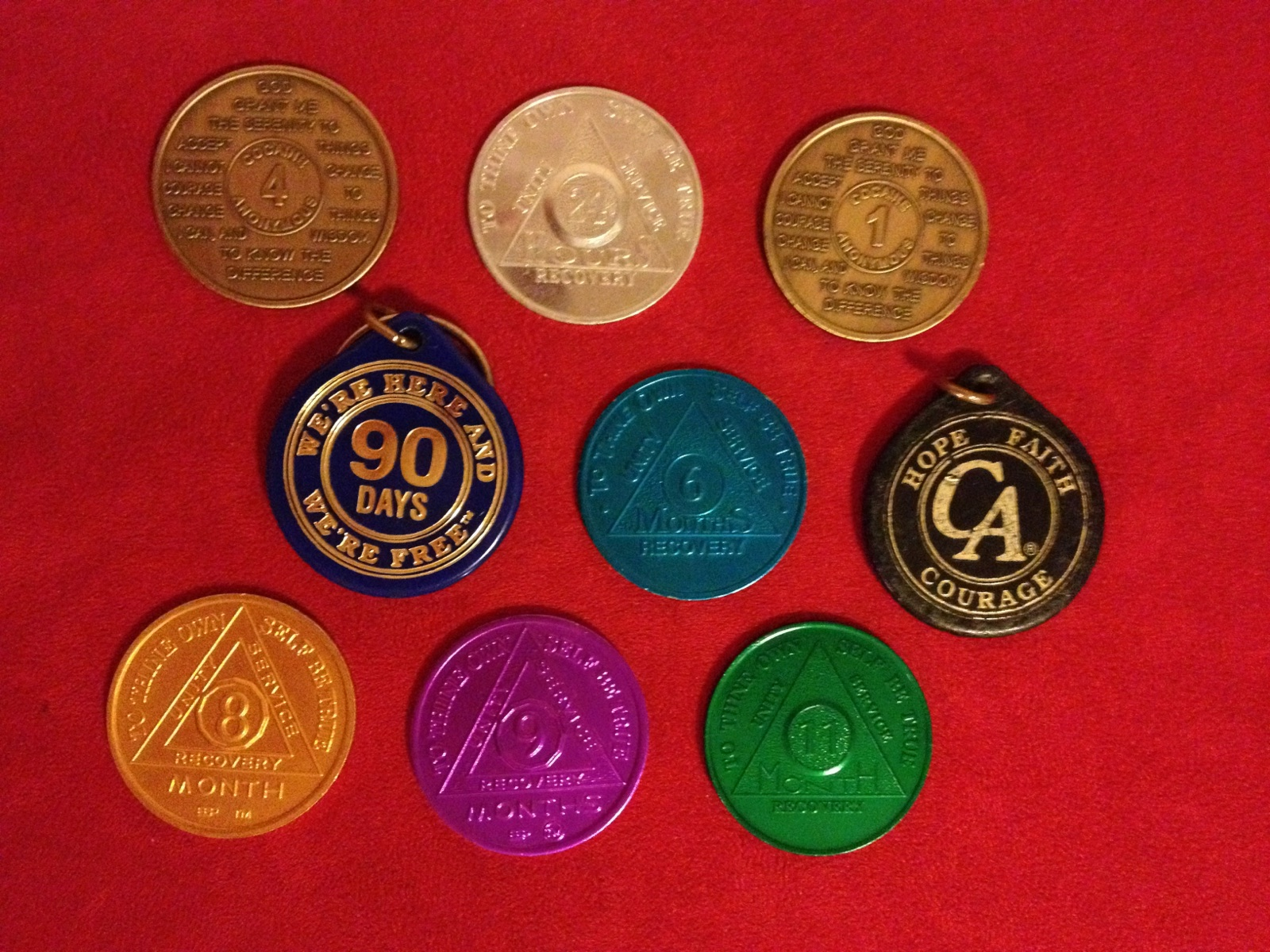
Cocaine Anonymous sobriety coins

Cocaine Anonymous (CA) is a twelve-step program formed in 18 November 1982 for people who seek recovery from drug addiction. It is patterned very closely after Alcoholics Anonymous (AA), although the two groups are unaffiliated. While many CA members have been addicted to cocaine, crack, speed or similar substances, CA accepts all who desire freedom from "cocaine and all other mind-altering substances" as members.

Numerous medications have been investigated for use in cocaine dependence, but as of 2015, none of them were considered to be effective. Drugs which help to re-stabilize the glutamate system such as N-acetylcysteine have been proposed for the treatment of addiction to cocaine, nicotine, and alcohol. However, none have sufficient evidence or regulatory approval for routine clinical use, so psychosocial interventions remain the mainstay of treatment.

==== Cocaine nose ====
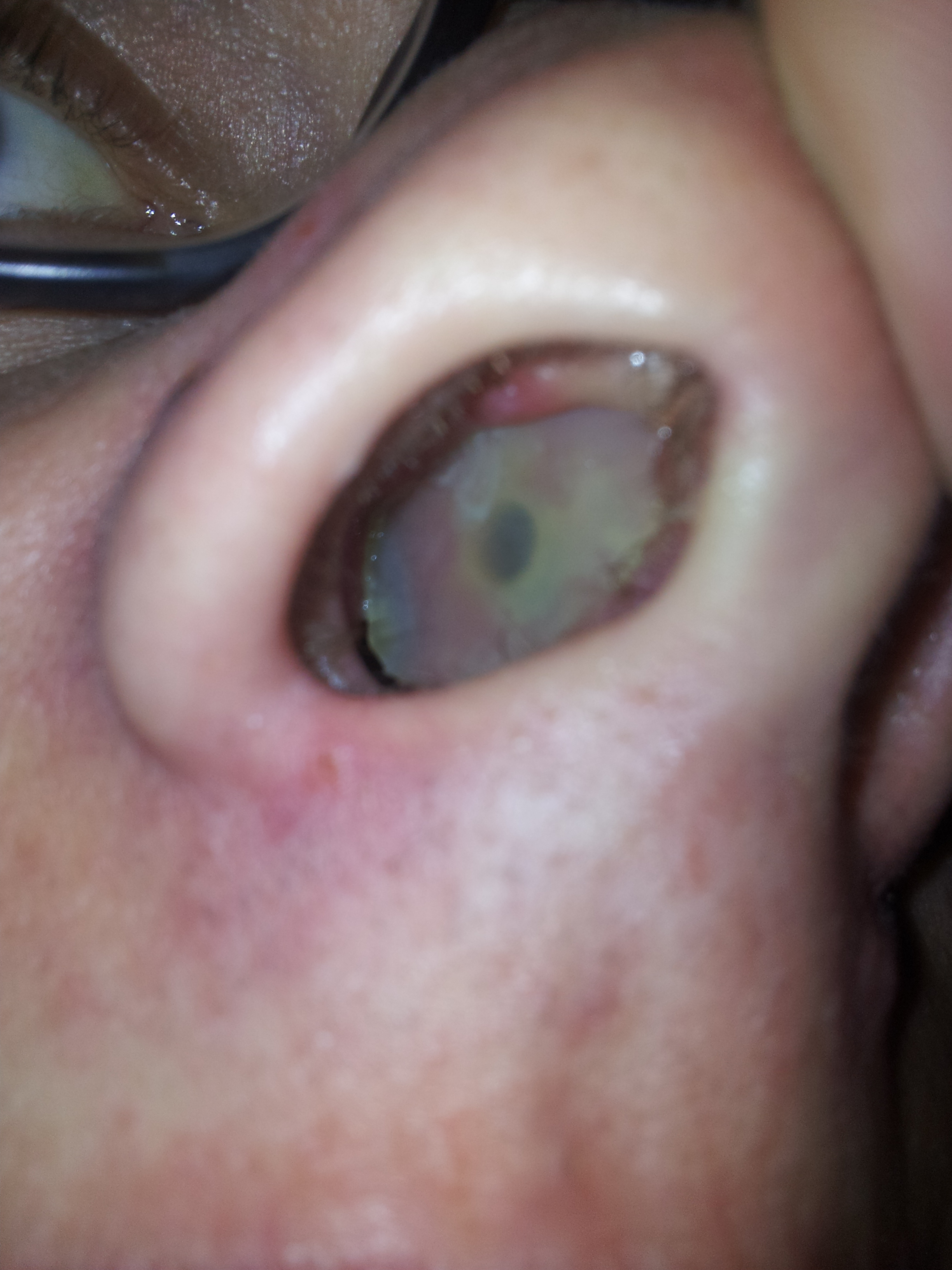
Nasal septum perforation caused by cocaine insufflation (pictured) can progress to cocaine-induced midline destructive lesions

"Cocaine nose" or "coke nose" are informal terms that refer to nose disorders resulting from repeated or chronic cocaine use.

About 30% of people who had snorted cocaine at least 25 times but less than daily, and 47% of daily users, reported experiencing nasal irritation, crusting or scabbing, and frequent nosebleeds. Cocaine use should be considered as a potential cause of persistent or unexplained rhinitis, including in adolescent patients.

Because the nose is a prominent facial feature, such visible damage often leads to embarrassment, stigma, and negative reactions from others. As a result, individuals with cocaine-induced nasal damage frequently withdraw from social activities and relationships, leading to social isolation. In many cases, this isolation is not just likely but almost inevitable, as affected individuals may feel unable to face the outside world due to the noticeable and sometimes severe changes to their appearance.

Nose disorders associated with cocaine nose include:

- Cocaine-induced midline destructive lesions (CIMDL)
- Nasal septum perforation
- Palate perforation
- Saddle nose

===== Cocaine-induced midline destructive lesions =====
Cocaine-induced midline destructive lesions (CIMDL) is the progressive destruction of nasal architecture with the erosion of the palate, nasal conchae, and ethmoid sinuses associated with prolonged insufflation, colloquially 'snorting', of cocaine.

Chronic intranasal usage can degrade the cartilage separating the nostrils (the septum nasi), leading eventually to its complete disappearance.

===== Causes =====
The cause of "cocaine nose" can be traced to the chemical process that occurs when cocaine hydrochloride is insufflated (snorted). As cocaine is absorbed through the nasal mucosa, the remaining hydrochloride component forms a dilute hydrochloric acid. The short half-life of cocaine, combined with binge use, may expose the nasal tissues to this acidic environment more frequently, increasing the risk of irritation and damage.

===== Treatment =====
For people with cocaine abuse, mild symptoms may resolve completely with total abstinence from cocaine, making early involvement of addiction services essential.

Repair may involve rhinoplasty, which includes creating a new internal lining with nasolabial flaps and restoring support with costal cartilage grafts.

In 2024, Belgian doctors report a rise in patients needing nose reconstruction due to cocaine use, which damages nasal tissue and cartilage; however, few undergo surgery because it requires at least six months of abstinence from cocaine for proper healing.

Some individuals seek plastic surgery to repair or reconstruct nasal damage caused by cocaine use, although surgical outcomes can be complicated by ongoing tissue loss and poor healing. When nasal damage is too severe for reconstruction, a nose prosthesis may be used to restore appearance and quality of life.

A 2010 study ranking various illegal and legal drugs based on statements by drug-harm experts in the UK. Crack cocaine and cocaine were found to be the third and fifth overall most dangerous drugs respectively.

2007 delphic analysis regarding 20 popular recreational drugs based on expert opinion in the UK. Cocaine was ranked the 2nd in dependence and physical harm and 3rd in social harm.

== Overdose ==
Death rates from cocaine overdoses

US yearly overdose deaths involving cocaine.

According to the European Union Drugs Agency, the estimated minimum lethal dose is 1.2 grams. However, sensitive individuals have died from as little as 30 milligrams applied to mucous membranes-an amount that is 40 times less than the minimum lethal dose. In contrast, addicts may tolerate doses as high as 5 grams per day.

Use of cocaine causes abnormally fast heart rhythms and a marked elevation of blood pressure (hypertension), which can be life-threatening. This can lead to death from acute myocardial infarction, acute respiratory failure (i.e., hypoxemia, with or without hypercapnia), stroke, cerebral hemorrhage, and sudden cardiac arrest. Overdose can also cause acute hepatotoxicity—typically due to toxic metabolites—though most cases resolve quickly; however, fatal outcomes from multiple organ dysfunction syndrome are possible, and there is no specific antidote. Cocaine overdose may result in hyperthermia as stimulation and increased muscular activity cause greater heat production. Heat loss is also inhibited by the cocaine-induced vasoconstriction.

In 2024, drug-related deaths in England and Wales reached their highest level in three decades, with a notable increase in fatalities involving cocaine and experts urging urgent government intervention to address the crisis. Martin Powell, from the charity Transform, which campaigns for the legal regulation of drugs, suggested that the recent rise in cocaine-related deaths in the UK may be due to the increased purity of cocaine, leading users to consume it more frequently and alongside other substances.

== Interactions ==
=== Alcohol ===
Alcohol interacts with cocaine in vivo to produce cocaethylene, another psychoactive substance which may be substantially more cardiotoxic than either cocaine or alcohol by themselves. In 2024, a systematic review of human studies concluded that, despite some inconsistencies in the findings, the co-use of cocaine and alcohol poses a significantly greater risk of cardiovascular fatalities compared to cocaine use alone. This elevated risk is largely attributed to the formation of cocaethylene, a unique and toxic metabolite produced only when both substances are consumed together. Cocaethylene is associated with an 18- to 25-fold increased risk of sudden death, as well as a higher incidence of myocardial injury and cardiac arrest, underscoring the serious health risks of simultaneous cocaine and alcohol use.

=== MAOIs ===
Monoamine oxidase inhibitors (MAOIs) should not be combined with other psychoactive substances (antidepressants, painkillers, stimulants, including prescribed, OTC and illegally acquired drugs, etc.) except under expert care.

=== Opioids ===
The opioid epidemic now involves more overdose deaths with both opioids and cocaine, especially among non-Hispanic Blacks who are twice as likely to die from combined opioid-stimulant overdoses compared to non-Hispanic whites. Cocaine-related deaths in Blacks are similar to opioid deaths in whites. Risk factors include young age, education, urban living, mental disorders, and stress. It remains unclear if co-use is intentional. Recent studies expand focus beyond heroin to all opioids, reflecting changing overdose patterns.

== Pharmacology ==
=== Pharmacokinetics ===
The extent of absorption of cocaine into the circulatory system after nasal insufflation is similar to that after oral ingestion. The rate of absorption after nasal insufflation is limited by cocaine-induced vasoconstriction of capillaries in the nasal mucosa. Onset of absorption after oral ingestion is delayed because cocaine is a weak base with a pKa of 8.6, and is thus in an ionized form that is poorly absorbed from the gastric acid and easily absorbed from the alkaline duodenum. The rate and extent of absorption from inhalation of cocaine is similar or greater than with intravenous injection, as inhalation provides access directly to the capillary bed. The delay in absorption after oral ingestion may account for the popular belief that cocaine bioavailability from the stomach is lower than after insufflation. Compared with ingestion, the faster absorption of insufflated cocaine results in quicker attainment of maximum drug effects. Snorting cocaine produces maximum physiological effects within 40 minutes and maximum psychotropic effects within 20 minutes. Physiological and psychotropic effects from nasally insufflated cocaine are sustained for approximately 40–60 minutes after the peak effects are attained.

Cocaine crosses the blood–brain barrier via both a proton-coupled organic cation antiporter and (to a lesser extent) via passive diffusion across cell membranes. As of September 2022, the gene or genes encoding the human proton-organic cation antiporter had not been identified.

Cocaine has a short elimination half-life of 0.7–1.5 hours and is extensively metabolized by plasma esterases and also by liver cholinesterases, with only about 1% excreted unchanged in the urine. The metabolism is dominated by hydrolytic ester cleavage, so the eliminated metabolites consist mostly of benzoylecgonine (BE), the major metabolite, and other metabolites in lesser amounts such as ecgonine methyl ester (EME) and ecgonine. Further minor metabolites of cocaine include norcocaine, p-hydroxycocaine, m-hydroxycocaine, p-hydroxybenzoylecgonine (pOHBE), and m-hydroxybenzoylecgonine.

Depending on liver and kidney functions, cocaine metabolites are detectable in urine between three and eight days. Generally speaking benzoylecgonine is eliminated from someone's urine between three and five days. In urine from heavy cocaine users, benzoylecgonine can be detected within four hours after intake and in concentrations greater than 150 ng/mL for up to eight days later.

=== Detection in the body ===
==== Body fluids ====
Cocaine and its major metabolites may be quantified in blood, plasma, or urine to monitor for use, confirm a diagnosis of poisoning, or assist in the forensic investigation of a traffic or other criminal violation or sudden death. Most commercial cocaine immunoassay screening tests cross-react appreciably with the major cocaine metabolites, but chromatographic techniques can easily distinguish and separately measure each of these substances. When interpreting the results of a test, it is important to consider the cocaine usage history of the individual, since a chronic user can develop tolerance to doses that would incapacitate a cocaine-naive individual, and the chronic user often has high baseline values of the metabolites in his system. Cautious interpretation of testing results may allow a distinction between passive or active usage, and between smoking versus other routes of administration.

==== Hair ====
Hair analysis can detect cocaine metabolites in regular users until after the sections of hair grown during the period of cocaine use are cut or fall out.

=== Pharmacodynamics ===
Cocaine acts as a serotonin–norepinephrine–dopamine reuptake inhibitor (SNDRI). Cocaine increases levels of serotonin, norepinephrine, and dopamine in the synaptic cleft, leading to heightened post-synaptic activation, with dopamine contributing to euphoria and arousal, and the other monoamines enhancing additional effects.

The pharmacodynamics of cocaine involve the complex relationships of neurotransmitters (inhibiting monoamine uptake in rats with ratios of about: serotonin:dopamine = 2:3, serotonin:norepinephrine = 2:5). The most extensively studied effect of cocaine on the central nervous system is the blockade of the dopamine transporter protein. Dopamine neurotransmitter released during neural signaling is normally recycled via the transporter; i.e., the transporter binds the transmitter and pumps it out of the synaptic cleft back into the presynaptic neuron, where it is taken up into storage vesicles. Cocaine binds tightly at the dopamine transporter forming a complex that blocks the transporter's function. The dopamine transporter can no longer perform its reuptake function, and thus dopamine accumulates in the synaptic cleft. The increased concentration of dopamine in the synapse activates post-synaptic dopamine receptors, which makes the drug rewarding and promotes the compulsive use of cocaine.

Cocaine affects certain serotonin (5-HT) receptors; in particular, it has been shown to antagonize the 5-HT_{3} receptor, which is a ligand-gated ion channel. An overabundance of 5-HT_{3} receptors is reported in cocaine-conditioned rats, though 5-HT_{3}'s role is unclear. The 5-HT_{2} receptor (particularly the subtypes 5-HT_{2A}, 5-HT_{2B} and 5-HT_{2C}) are involved in the locomotor-activating effects of cocaine.

Cocaine has been demonstrated to bind as to directly stabilize the DAT transporter on the open outward-facing conformation. Further, cocaine binds in such a way as to inhibit a hydrogen bond innate to DAT. Cocaine's binding properties are such that it attaches so this hydrogen bond will not form and is blocked from formation due to the tightly locked orientation of the cocaine molecule. Research studies have suggested that the affinity for the transporter is not what is involved in the habituation of the substance so much as the conformation and binding properties to where and how on the transporter the molecule binds.

Conflicting findings have challenged the widely accepted view that cocaine functions solely as a reuptake inhibitor. To induce euphoria an intravenous dose of 0.3-0.6 mg/kg of cocaine is required, which blocks 66-70% of DAT in the brain. Re-administering cocaine beyond this threshold does not significantly increase DAT occupancy but still results in an increase of euphoria which cannot be explained by reuptake inhibition alone. This discrepancy is not shared with other dopamine reuptake inhibitors like bupropion, sibutramine, mazindol or tesofensine, which have similar or higher potencies than cocaine as dopamine reuptake inhibitors. Furthermore, a similar response-occupancy discrepancy has been observed with methylphenidate, which also stabilizes the dopamine transporter in an open outward-facing conformation. These findings have evoked a hypothesis that cocaine may also function as a so-called "DAT inverse agonist" or "negative allosteric modifier of DAT" resulting in dopamine transporter reversal, and subsequent dopamine release into the synaptic cleft from the axon terminal in a manner similar to but distinct from amphetamines.

Sigma receptors are affected by cocaine, as cocaine functions as a sigma ligand agonist. Further specific receptors it has been demonstrated to function on are NMDA and the D_{1} dopamine receptor.

Cocaine also blocks sodium channels, thereby interfering with the propagation of action potentials; thus, like lignocaine and novocaine, it acts as a local anesthetic. It also functions on the binding sites to the dopamine and serotonin sodium dependent transport area as targets as separate mechanisms from its reuptake of those transporters; unique to its local anesthetic value which makes it in a class of functionality different from both its own derived phenyltropanes analogues which have that removed. In addition to this, cocaine has some target binding to the site of the κ-opioid receptor. Cocaine also causes vasoconstriction, thus reducing bleeding during minor surgical procedures. Recent research points to an important role of circadian mechanisms and clock genes in behavioral actions of cocaine.

Cocaine is known to suppress hunger and appetite by increasing co-localization of sigma σ_{1}R receptors and ghrelin GHS-R1a cell surface receptors, thereby increasing ghrelin-mediated signaling of satiety and possibly via other effects on appetitive hormones.

Cocaine effects, further, are shown to be potentiated for the user when used in conjunction with new surroundings and stimuli, and otherwise novel environs.

== Chemistry ==
=== Forms ===
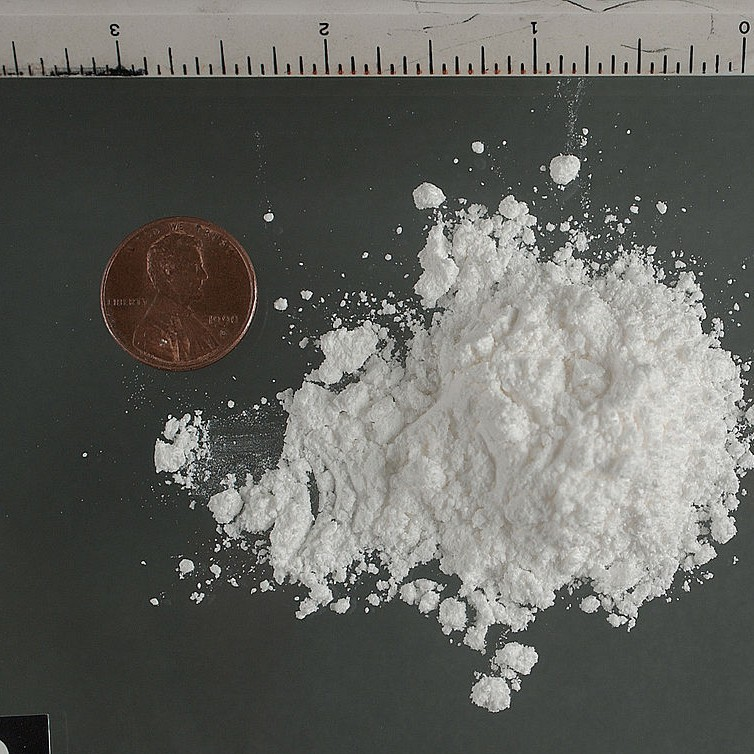
A pile of micronized cocaine hydrochloride

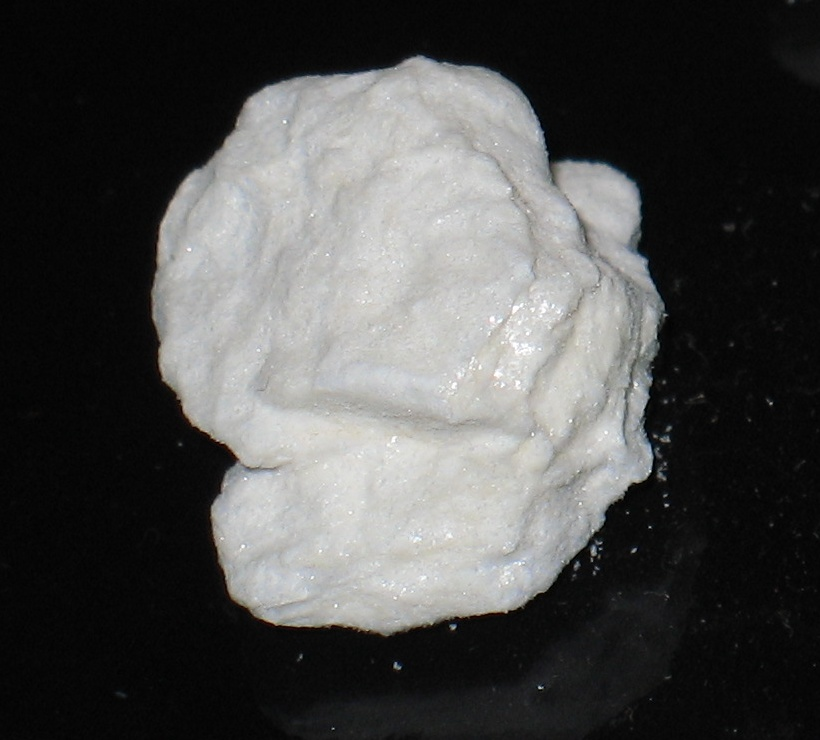
A piece of compressed cocaine hydrochloride, commonly used for smuggling

In its purest form, cocaine is a white, pearly powder. As a tropane alkaloid, cocaine is a weak base and readily forms salts when combined with acids. The most commonly encountered form is the hydrochloride (HCl) salt, although other salts such as the sulfate (SO_{4}^{2−}) and nitrate (NO_{3}^{−}) are occasionally observed. The solubility of these salts varies depending on their polarity; the hydrochloride salt is highly soluble in water.

=== Synthesis ===
==== Total synthesis ====
The first structure elucidation and total synthesis of the cocaine molecule was accomplished by Richard Willstätter in 1898. Willstätter's synthesis involved constructing the cocaine structure from simpler precursors, notably via the intermediate tropinone. Subsequent significant contributions to understanding the synthetic pathway and stereochemistry were made by Robert Robinson and Edward Leete.

Cocaine contains four chiral centers (1R, 2R, 3S, and 5S), two of which are configurationally dependent, resulting in eight possible stereoisomers. The formation of inactive stereoisomers, along with various synthetic by-products, limits both the yield and purity of the final product.

Although the chemical synthesis of cocaine is technically feasible, it remains impractical due to its high cost, low efficiency, and complex stereoselective synthesis compared to extraction from natural plant sources. While domestic clandestine laboratories could theoretically reduce reliance on offshore production and international smuggling—as seen with illicit methamphetamine—manufacture and synthetic production of cocaine remains rare. Large-scale commercial synthesis has not been explored.

==== Biosynthesis ====
The biosynthesis of cocaine is the natural metabolic process by which the coca plant (Erythroxylum species) produces cocaine, a tropane alkaloid, through a multi-step enzymatically catalyzed pathway beginning with ornithine or arginine and culminating in the formation of the cocaine metabolite benzoylecgonine.

Large-scale biosynthesis of cocaine is unexplored.

The biosynthesis of cocaine has long attracted the attention of biochemists and organic chemists. This interest is partly motivated by the strong physiological effects of cocaine, but a further incentive was the unusual bicyclic structure of the molecule. The biosynthesis can be viewed as occurring in two phases, one phase leading to the N-methylpyrrolinium ring, which is preserved in the final product. The second phase incorporates a C4 unit with formation of the bicyclic tropane core.

==== GMO synthesis ====
In 2022, a GMO produced N. benthamiana were discovered that were able to produce 25% of the amount of cocaine found in a coca plant.

However, since N. benthamiana also naturally contains nicotine, separating the cocaine from nicotine and related alkaloids would be challenging.

=== Field analysis ===
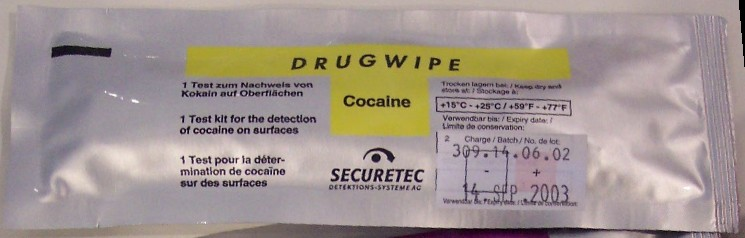
Drugwipe test can detect traces of illicit substances, including cocaine, on surfaces such as driver's licenses at random checkpoints.

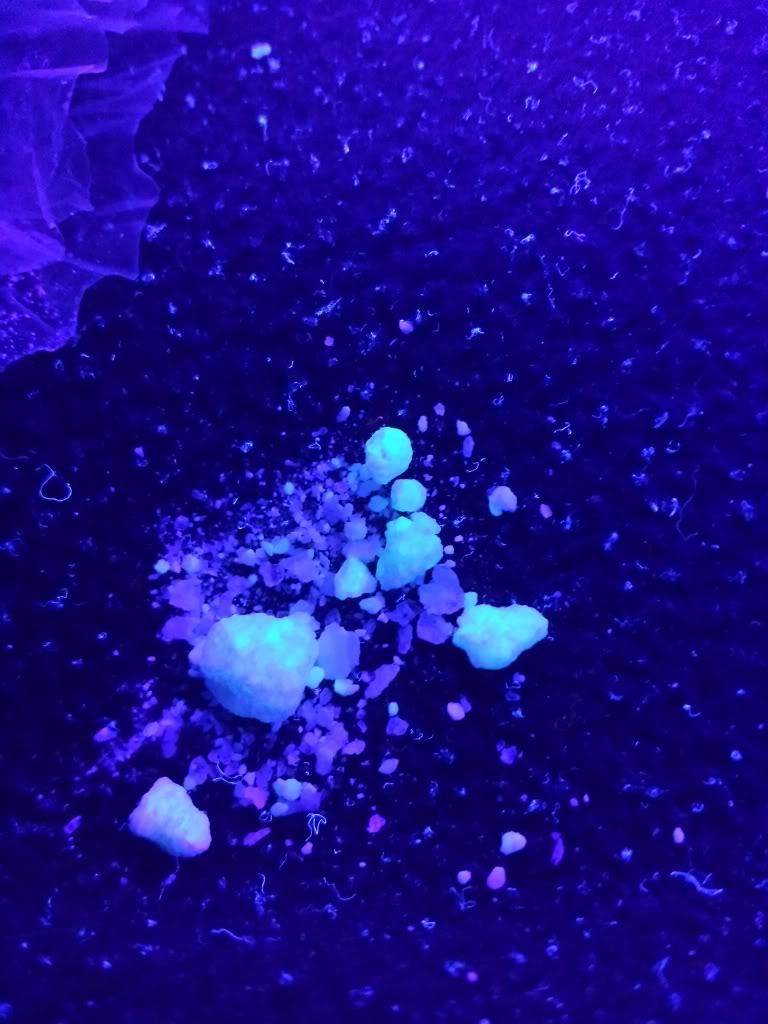
Cocaine under UV light

Personal cards-including ID cards and driver's licenses-are frequently swabbed by inspectors to detect drug residue, as these items are commonly used to prepare lines of cocaine. Swabbing can reveal traces of cocaine or other illicit substances, providing evidence of recent drug handling or use. This practice may be employed during security checks at border crossings.

A Newsbeat investigation found that "cocaine torches" used by UK police to detect cocaine use are ineffective on typical street cocaine, as independent lab tests showed they fail to make the drug fluoresce. Experts and drug charities criticized the devices, warning they can give false positives and waste resources, while police forces defended their use as a deterrent. The manufacturer says the torches only work on much purer forms of cocaine than are found on the street.

Cocaine may be detected by law enforcement using the Scott reagent. The test can easily generate false positives for common substances and must be confirmed with a laboratory test.

Approximate cocaine purity can be determined using 1 mL 2% cupric sulfate pentahydrate in dilute HCl, 1 mL 2% potassium thiocyanate and 2 mL of chloroform. The shade of brown shown by the chloroform is proportional to the cocaine content. This test is not cross sensitive to heroin, methamphetamine, benzocaine, procaine and a number of other drugs but other chemicals could cause false positives.

== History ==
Coca leaves have been used by indigenous South Americans for thousands of years, both as a stimulant and for medicinal purposes.

When the Spanish arrived in South America, they initially banned coca but soon legalized and taxed it after seeing its importance to local labor. The active ingredient was first isolated in 1855 by Friedrich Gaedcke and later refined by Albert Niemann, who named it "cocaine". In the late 1800s, cocaine became popular in Western medicine as a local anesthetic and was widely used in various products, including drinks and remedies, and James Leonard Corning demonstrated its effect of peridural anesthesia. However, due to its toxic effects and potential for abuse, safer alternatives eventually replaced it in medical practice.

Large-scale coca cultivation and cocaine production occurred in Asia, on Taiwan (then known as Formosa) and Java (today part of Indonesia) before World War II.

Since the 1980s, the cocaine trade was dominated by centralized, hierarchical drug cartels such as Medellín and Cali, along with their successors and early FARC factions. By the early 2000s, this model fragmented into a diverse network of global trafficking links, allowing South American cocaine production to easily supply markets in Europe, Africa, Asia, and Oceania through various routes.

== Society and culture ==
Both the pharmaceutical supply chain and the illicit supply chain obtain cocaine from coca cultivated in Latin America, but they operate under very different controls and oversight. In Peru, for example, legal coca cultivation is monopolized by the state company National Coca Company (ENACO), yet approximately 90% of coca leaves produced in the country are diverted to illegal actors for cocaine manufacturing. As a result, these illicit coca crops are a primary target of ongoing government-led coca eradication efforts.

Cocaine is prohibited in competition for athletes by the World Anti-Doping Agency (WADA), which lists it as a stimulant on its International Standard for the Prohibited List.

=== Slang names ===
Cocaine is sometimes referred to on the street as blow, coca, coke, crank, flake, snow, or soda cot. Slang terms for free base cocaine include crack or rock.

=== Levamisole syndromes ===
Levamisole is one of the most common cutting agents used to lace illicit cocaine, with studies showing that between 2009 and 2016, 50–70% of all cocaine specimens worldwide contained levamisole, reflecting similar high rates of contamination across North America and Europe. Before trafficking to the United States, the cocaine is frequently adulterated with levamisole. By October 2017, this figure had risen further, with the US Drug Enforcement Administration (DEA) reporting that 87% of seized and analyzed cocaine bricks in the United States contained levamisole, making it the most common adulterant in cocaine at that time.

In the body, levamisole is converted into aminorex, a substance with amphetamine-like stimulant effects and a long duration of action. Levamisole-adulterated cocaine is associated with cocaine/levamisole-associated autoimmune syndrome (CLAAS) and cocaine- and levamisole-induced vasculitis (CLIV). Reagent testing kits can be used to detect the presence of cocaine and levamisole.

=== Legal status ===
The production, distribution, and sale of cocaine products is restricted (and illegal in most contexts) in most countries as regulated by the Single Convention on Narcotic Drugs, and the United Nations Convention Against Illicit Traffic in Narcotic Drugs and Psychotropic Substances. In the United States the manufacture, importation, possession, and distribution of cocaine are additionally regulated by the 1970 Controlled Substances Act.

Some countries, such as Bolivia, Colombia, and Peru, permit the cultivation of coca leaf for traditional consumption by the local indigenous population, but nevertheless, prohibit the production, sale, and consumption of cocaine. The provisions as to how much a coca farmer can yield annually is protected by laws such as the Bolivian Cato accord. In addition, some parts of Europe, the United States, and Australia allow processed cocaine for medicinal uses only.

==== Australia ====
Cocaine is a Schedule 8 controlled drug in Australia under the Poisons Standard. It is the second most popular illicit recreational drug in Australia behind cannabis.

In Western Australia under the Misuse of Drugs Act 1981, 4.0g of cocaine is the amount of prohibited drugs determining a court of trial, 2.0g is the amount of cocaine required for the presumption of intention to sell or supply, and 28.0g is the amount of cocaine required for purposes of drug trafficking.

==== United States ====
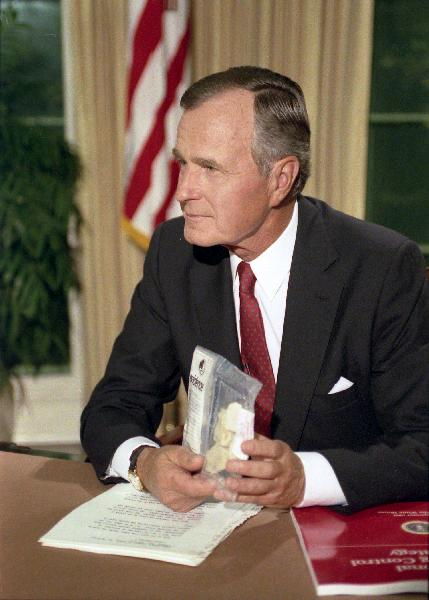
President George H. W. Bush holds up a bag of crack cocaine during his Address to the Nation on National Drug Control Strategy on 5 September 1989.

The US federal government instituted a national drug labelling requirement for cocaine and cocaine-containing products through the Pure Food and Drug Act of 1906. The next important federal regulation was the Harrison Narcotics Tax Act of 1914. While this act is often seen as the start of prohibition, the act itself was not actually a prohibition on cocaine, but instead it set up a regulatory and licensing regime. The Harrison Act did not recognize addiction as a treatable condition and therefore the therapeutic use of cocaine, heroin, or morphine to such individuals was outlawed – leading a 1915 editorial in the journal American Medicine to remark that the addict "is denied the medical care he urgently needs, open, above-board sources from which he formerly obtained his drug supply are closed to him, and he is driven to the underworld where he can get his drug, but of course, surreptitiously and in violation of the law." The Harrison Act left manufacturers of cocaine untouched so long as they met certain purity and labeling standards. Despite that cocaine was typically illegal to sell and legal outlets were rarer, the quantities of legal cocaine produced declined very little. Legal cocaine quantities did not decrease until the Jones–Miller Act of 1922 put serious restrictions on cocaine manufactures.

Before the early 1900s, newspapers primarily portrayed addiction (rather than violence or crime) as the main problem caused by cocaine use, and depicted cocaine users as upper or middle class White people. In 1914, The New York Times published an article titled "Negro Cocaine 'Fiends' Are a New Southern Menace," portraying Black people who used cocaine as dangerous and able to withstand wounds that would normally be fatal. The Anti-Drug Abuse Act of 1986 mandated the same prison sentences for distributing 500 grams of powdered cocaine and just 5 grams of crack cocaine. In the National Survey on Drug Use and Health, white respondents reported a higher rate of powdered cocaine use, and Black respondents reported a higher rate of crack cocaine use.

=== Prevalence and trends ===
Cocaine production, seizures, and use all reached record levels in 2023, making it the world's fastest-growing illicit drug market. Seizures rose by 68% from 2019 to 2023, while the number of users increased from 17 million in 2013 to 25 million in 2023, according to the UNODC World Drug Report 2025. Concurrently, record levels of cocaine production have enabled traffickers to enter new markets across Asia and Africa, reflecting the expanding global reach of cocaine trafficking.

The U.S. is disproportionately the world's largest consumer of cocaine, while South America, collectively as a continent, ranks third in terms of consumer market size. Europe ranks cocaine as the second most commonly used illicit drug.

Cocaine is among the most widely consumed recreational stimulants worldwide.

=== Impact ===
==== Impact of illicit cocaine ====
===== Impact on impoverished communities =====
In countries where cocaine is illicitly produced, an intermediate product known as cocaine paste—often referred to as "poor man's cocaine"—is frequently smoked in impoverished communities. This substance is favored in these areas primarily because it is inexpensive and more accessible than refined cocaine. However, the use of cocaine paste poses severe health risks. During its production, various toxic chemicals are used to extract coca alkaloids from the coca leaves. Many of these hazardous substances, such as solvents and acids, remain in the paste after processing. When the paste is smoked, individuals are exposed not only to the addictive effects of the drug itself but also to the dangerous residual chemicals, which can cause significant harm to the lungs, nervous system, and overall health. This combination of affordability, accessibility, and toxicity makes cocaine paste particularly damaging to vulnerable populations in cocaine-producing regions.

===== Environmental impact =====
Most of the world's cocaine is produced in South America, particularly in the Andean region. The environmental destruction caused by the production of cocaine has been well documented, with reports made the UN and other government bodies. Due to the illegal nature of coca production, farmers make little effort in soil conservation and sustainability practices as seen in the high mobility and short life of coca plots in Colombia.

One of the major implications of cocaine production is deforestation as large areas of forest are cleared for coca cultivation. The UNODC approximated that 97,622 hectares of primary forest were cleared for coca cultivation during 2001–2004 in the Andean region. This further causes habitat destruction, especially in biodiversity hotspots, areas rich in a variety of species. Such areas are chosen for coca cultivation due to their remote locations, minimising chances of detection. Deforestation impacts soil erosion which further inhibits the survival of native species.

The use of pesticides can also severely affect the environment. Farmers are able to use unregulated and highly toxic pesticides due to the clandestine nature of drug production. The use of such pesticides can have both direct and indirect effects on the ecosystem. Where lethal levels of exposure directly cause the death of fauna, which is further carried up the food chain where secondary feeders who consume the poisoned animals are also impacted. Furthermore, non-lethal levels of exposure can also cause weaker immune system development and neurological issues, further increasing mortality rates.

===== Impact of illicit cocaine trade =====
Cocaine is extremely expensive on the black market, with prices rising sharply at each distribution level—often more than its weight in gold.

====== Latin America ======
Drug war policies in Latin America and the Caribbean have led to more violence, higher incarceration rates, health crises, and deeper poverty, while undermining trust in institutions and worsening inequality. There is increasing support for shifting toward drug policies that focus on sustainable development and human rights instead of punitive measures.

====== West Africa ======
Cocaine trafficking in West Africa has become closely linked with the activities of several terrorist organizations.

==== Impact of enforcement ====
===== Impact of coca eradication =====
In December 2000, Dutch journalist Marjon van Royen found that "because the [herbicide] chemical is sprayed in Colombia from planes on inhabited areas, there have been consistent health complaints [in humans]. Burning eyes, dizziness and respiratory problems being most frequently reported." In some areas, 80 percent of the children of the indigenous community fell sick with skin rashes, fever, diarrhoea and eye infections. Because the glyphosate is sprayed from the air, there is a much higher chance of human error when spraying suspected illegal coca plantations. In many cases the wrong fields are sprayed, resulting in not only a total loss of the farmer's crop- but the loss of that field altogether as nothing will grow where the herbicide has been sprayed. Though official documentation of the health effects of glyphosate spraying in Colombia are virtually non-existent, neighbouring Ecuador has conducted studies to determine the cause of mysterious illnesses amongst people living along the border of Colombia and has since demanded that no aerial sprayings occur within 10 km of the border because of the damages caused to the people, animals and environment in that area. In 2015, Colombia announced a ban on using glyphosate in these programs due to concerns about human toxicity of the chemical.

===== Impact of interdiction =====
The Consolidated Counterdrug Database (CCDB) is a U.S. government dataset created in the 1990s that compiles vetted data on cocaine trafficking and seizures in the Western Hemisphere "transit zone," involving 26 U.S. agencies and 20 foreign partners. It provides a highly reliable, conservative record of cocaine movements and interdiction efforts, revealing that despite large seizures, interdiction captures only a small fraction of trafficking events and has minimal impact on U.S. cocaine prices. The CCDB challenges optimistic views of drug interdiction effectiveness and underscores the need for new policy approaches, yet remains underutilized in research despite being unclassified.

=== Etymology ===
The word cocaine derives from French Cocaïne, from Spanish coca, ultimately from Quechua kúka.

== Research ==
Cocaine haptens are chemically modified derivatives of cocaine that retain key immunogenic features, allowing them to be attached to carrier proteins such as keyhole limpet hemocyanin or bovine serum albumin. This enables the immune system to recognize cocaine and produce anti-cocaine antibodies, which can bind cocaine in the bloodstream and prevent it from reaching the brain, thereby blocking its psychoactive effects.

The cocaine esterase enzyme and redesigned versions of it have been studied as a potential treatment for cocaine addiction in humans.

Coca tea has been explored as a supportive treatment for cocaine dependence. A study in Lima, Peru, found that using coca leaf infusion along with counseling reduced relapse rates and significantly increased the duration of abstinence among addicted individuals, suggesting that this approach may help prevent relapse during treatment.

Recent research has also examined the use of prescription psychostimulants for cocaine dependence, following the Self-Medication Hypothesis. This hypothesis suggests that some individuals use cocaine to address underlying neurochemical or psychological issues. While some studies indicate that psychostimulant therapy may reduce cocaine use and cravings, the evidence is mixed and further research is needed.

In animal studies, nicotine exposure in mice increases the likelihood of later cocaine use, with clear molecular changes in the brain. These findings mirror human epidemiological data showing a link between nicotine use and increased risk of later cannabis and cocaine use, as well as other substances. Similarly, in rats, alcohol consumption raises the probability of later cocaine addiction and is associated with changes in the brain's reward system. Human studies also show that alcohol use increases the risk of transitioning from cocaine use to addiction.

Experimentally, cocaine injections can be delivered to animals such as fruit flies to study the mechanisms of cocaine addiction.

=== Cocaine vaccines ===
==== Calixcoca ====
Calixcoca is an experimental vaccine to treat cocaine and crack cocaine addiction. It has been in development since 2015 by the Federal University of Minas Gerais (UFMG) in Brazil.

==== TA-CD ====
TA-CD is a vaccine developed by the Xenova Group and designed to negate the effects of cocaine, making it suitable for use in treatment of addiction. It is created by combining norcocaine with inactivated cholera toxin.

== See also ==
- Cocaine reverse ester
- Cocaine and amphetamine regulated transcript
- Maritime cocaine trafficking
