= Nasal septum perforation =

Medical condition whereby the membranes dividing the nostrils are breached

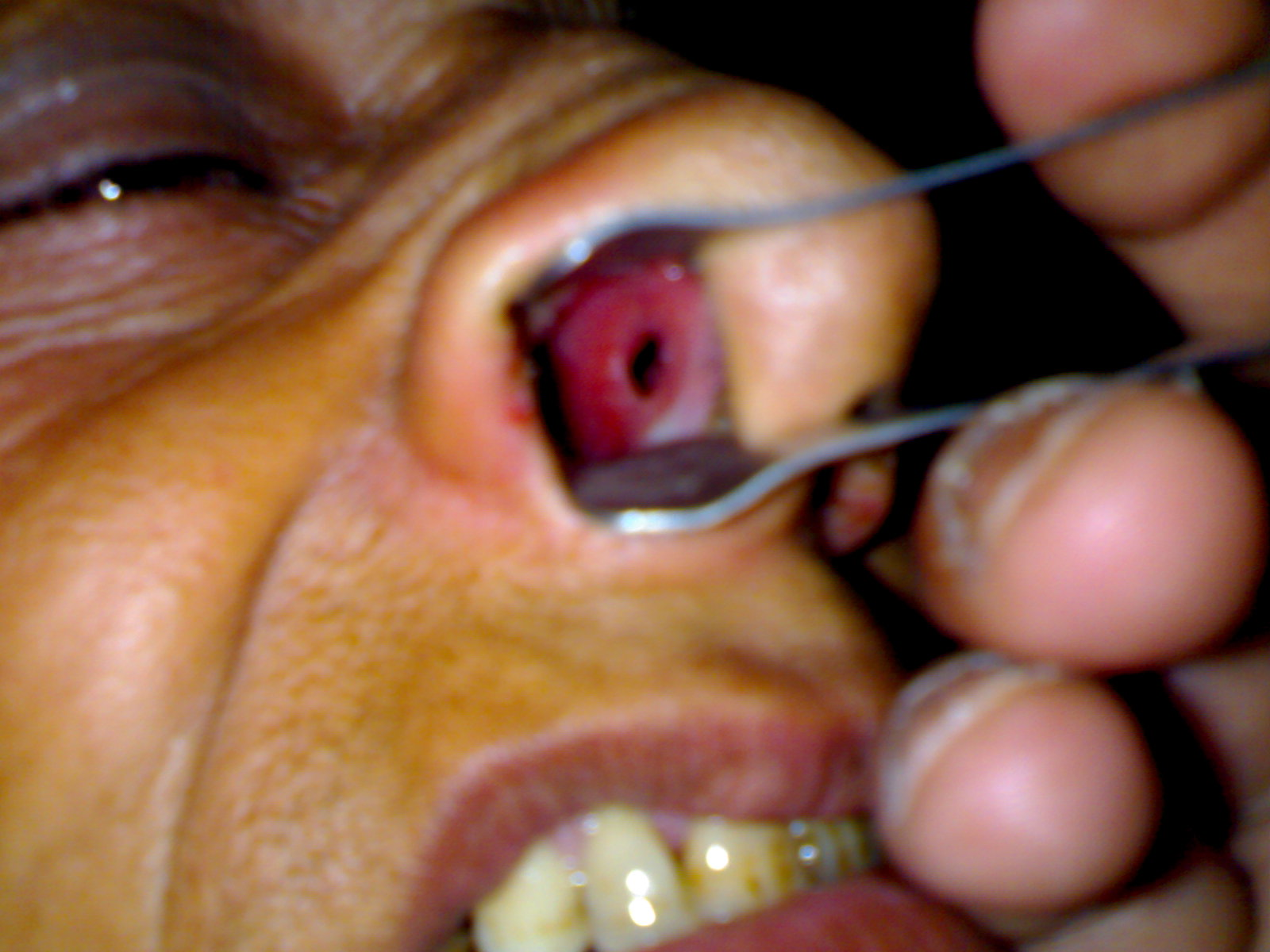
- Specialty: Otorhinolaryngology

A nasal septum perforation is a medical condition in which the nasal septum, the bony/cartilaginous wall dividing the nasal cavities, develops a hole or fissure.

This may be brought on directly, as in the case of nasal piercings, or indirectly, as by long-term topical drug application, including nasal administration of ethylphenidate, methamphetamine, cocaine, crushed prescription pills, or decongestant nasal sprays, chronic epistaxis, excessive nose picking and as a complication of nasal surgery like septoplasty or rhinoplasty. Much less common causes for perforated nasal septums include rare granulomatous inflammatory conditions like granulomatosis with polyangiitis. It has been reported as a side effect of anti-angiogenesis drugs like bevacizumab.

== Signs and symptoms ==
A perforated septum can vary in size and location, and is usually found deep inside the nose. It may be asymptomatic, or cause a variety of signs and symptoms. Small perforations can cause a whistling noise when breathing. Larger perforations usually have more severe symptoms. These can be a combination of crusting, blood discharge, difficulty breathing, nasal pressure and discomfort. The closer the perforation is to the nostrils, the more likely it is to cause symptoms.

== Cause ==
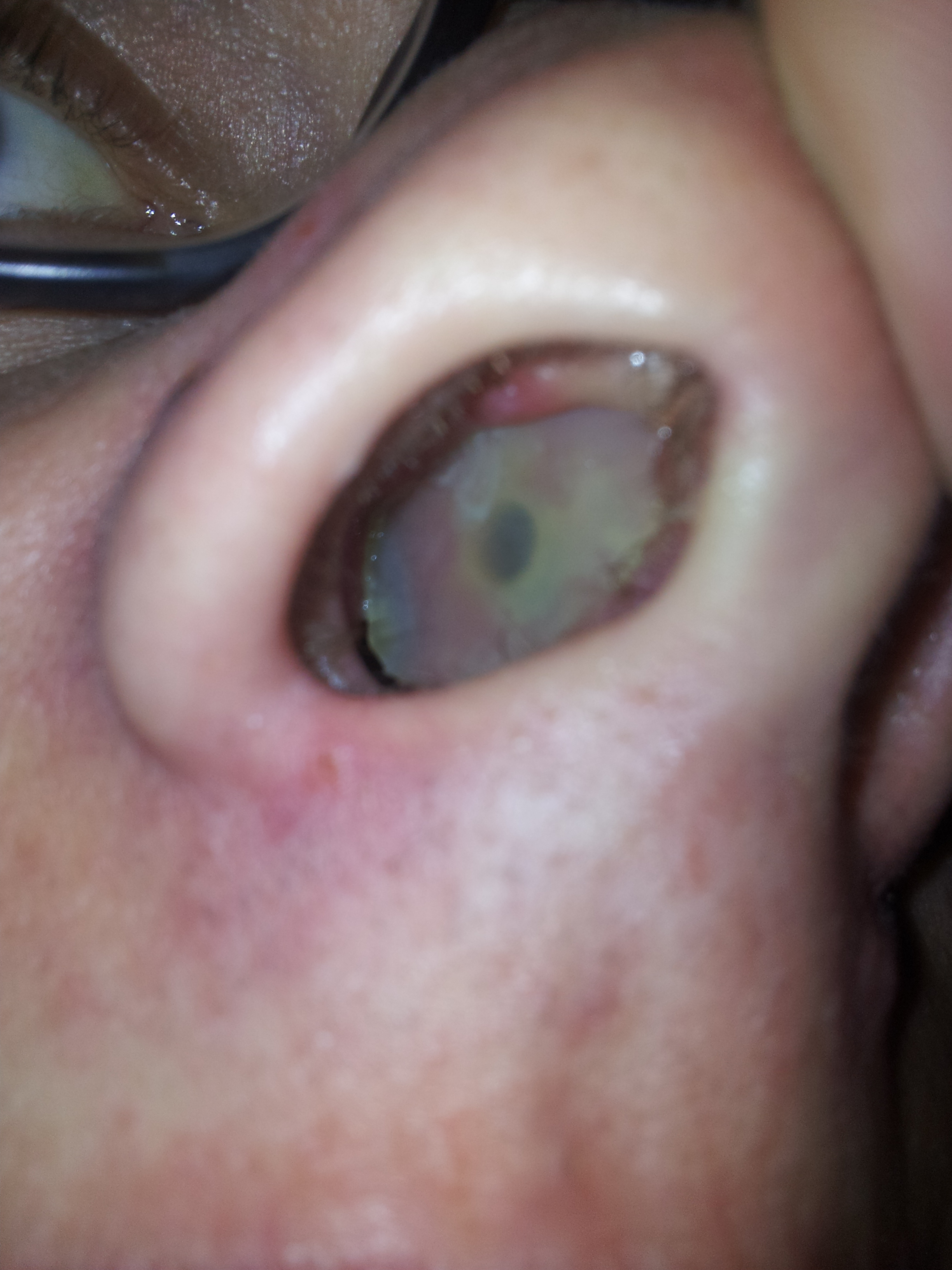
"Cocaine nose" refers to nasal septum perforation from cocaine use (pictured), or to cocaine-induced midline destructive lesions (CIMDL), which may develop as the damage progresses.

Infective causes include syphilis, leprosy, and rhinoscleroma. Non-infective causes include an in situ foreign body, facial trauma, a consequence of nasal surgery, or chronic nasal administration of cocaine, methamphetamine, or topical nasal decongestants.

== Treatment ==
Septal perforations are managed with a multitude of options. The treatment often depends on the severity of symptoms and the size of the perforations. Generally speaking, anterior septal perforations are more bothersome and symptomatic. Posterior septal perforations, which mainly occur iatrogenically, are often managed with simple observation and are at times intended portions of skull base surgery. Septal perforations that are not bothersome can be managed with simple observation. While no septal perforation will spontaneously close, for the majority of septal perforations that are unlikely to get larger, observation is an appropriate form of management. For perforations that bleed or are painful, initial management should include humidification and application of salves to the perforation edges to promote healing. Mucosalization of the perforation edges will help prevent pain and recurrent epistaxis and majority of septal perforations can be managed without surgery. For perforations in which anosmia, or the loss of smell, and a persistent whistling are a concern, the use of a silicone septal button is a treatment option. These can be placed while the patient is awake and usually in the clinic setting. While complications of button insertion are minimal, the presence of the button can be bothersome to most patients.

For patients who desire definitive close, surgery is the only option. Prior to determining candidacy for surgical closure, the etiology of the perforation must be determined. Often this requires a biopsy of the perforation to rule out autoimmune causes. If a known cause such as cocaine is the offending agent, it must be ensured that the patient is not still using the irritant.

For those that are determined to be medically cleared for surgery, the anatomical location and size of the perforation must be determined. This is often done with a combination of a CT scan of the sinuses without contrast and an endoscopic evaluation by an Ear Nose and Throat doctor. Once dimensions are obtained the surgeon will decide if it is possible to close the perforation. Multiple approaches to access the septum have been described in the literature. While sublabial and midfacial degloving approaches have been described, the most popular today is the rhinoplasty approach. This can include both open and closed methods. The open method results in a scar on the columella, however, it allows for more visibility to the surgeon. The closed method utilizes an incision all on the inside of the nose. The concept behind closure includes bringing together the edges of mucosa on each side of the perforation with minimal tension. An interposition graft is also often used. The interposition graft provides extended stability and also structure to the area of the perforation. Classically, a graft from the scalp utilizing temporalis fascia was used. Kridel, et al., first described the usage of acellular dermis so that no further incisions are required; they reported an excellent closure rate of over 90 percent. Overall perforation closure rates are variable and often determined by the skill of the surgeon and technique used. Often surgeons who claim a high rate of closure choose perforations that are easier to close. An open rhinoplasty approach also allows for better access to the nose to repair any concurrent nasal deformities, such as saddle nose deformity, that occur with a septal perforation.

== See also ==
- Nasal septum deviation
