= Moffett's solution =

Mixture of adrenaline, sodium bicarbonate and cocaine

Moffett's solution is a mixture of adrenaline, sodium bicarbonate and cocaine that is used to provide topical analgesia and vasoconstriction during ear, nose, and throat surgery, especially for operations on the nose.

The solution is named after Arthur James Moffett (1904–1995) of the Royal Army Medical Corps who first described the solution in 1941.
