= Cocaine (data page) =

Chemical data page

This page provides supplementary chemical data on Cocaine in free base form. More commonly available "powder cocaine" is a hydrochloride salt whose properties will differ.

== Material Safety Data Sheet ==
The handling of this chemical may incur notable safety precautions. It is highly recommend that you seek the Material Safety Datasheet (MSDS) for this chemical from a reliable source such as SIRI, and follow its directions.

== Structure and properties ==
Structure and properties
| Index of refraction, n_{D} | 1.5022 |
| Abbe number | ? |
| Dielectric constant, ε_{r} | ? ε_{0} at ? °C |
| Bond strength | ? |
| Bond length | ? |
| Bond angle | ? |
| Magnetic susceptibility | ? |
| Melting point | 98 °C |
| Boiling point | 187 °C |
| Solubility | 1.7 g/L at 25 °C |

== Thermodynamic properties ==
Phase behavior
| Triple point | ? K (? °C), ? Pa |
| Critical point | ? K (? °C), ? Pa |
| Std enthalpy change of fusion, Δ_{fus}H^{~~o~~} | ? kJ/mol |
| Std entropy change of fusion, Δ_{fus}S^{~~o~~} | ? J/(mol·K) |
| Std enthalpy change of vaporization, Δ_{vap}H^{~~o~~} | ? kJ/mol |
| Std entropy change of vaporization, Δ_{vap}S^{~~o~~} | ? J/(mol·K) |
Solid properties
| Std enthalpy change of formation, Δ_{f}H^{~~o~~}_{solid} | ? kJ/mol |
| Standard molar entropy, S^{~~o~~}_{solid} | ? J/(mol K) |
| Specific heat capacity, c_{p} | ? J/(mol K) |
Liquid properties
| Std enthalpy change of formation, Δ_{f}H^{~~o~~}_{liquid} | ? kJ/mol |
| Standard molar entropy, S^{~~o~~}_{liquid} | ? J/(mol K) |
| Specific heat capacity, c_{p} | ? J/(mol K) |
Gas properties
| Std enthalpy change of formation, Δ_{f}H^{~~o~~}_{gas} | ? kJ/mol |
| Standard molar entropy, S^{~~o~~}_{gas} | ? J/(mol K) |
| Specific heat capacity, c_{p} | ? J/(mol K) |

== Spectral data ==
UV-Vis
| λ_{max} | ? nm |
| Extinction coefficient, ε | ? |
IR
| Major absorption bands | ? cm^{−1} |
NMR
| Proton NMR |
| Carbon-13 NMR |
| Other NMR data |
MS
| Masses of main fragments |
