= Cocaine-induced midline destructive lesions =

Nasal condition associated with cocaine use

- Specialty: Rhinology
- Causes: Cocaine insufflation
- Treatment: Surgery
- Frequency: 5% of cocaine users

Cocaine-induced midline destructive lesions (CIMDL) is the progressive destruction of nasal architecture with the erosion of the palate, nasal conchae, and ethmoid sinuses associated with prolonged insufflation, colloquially 'snorting', of cocaine. The condition begins with erosion of mucosal lining and progress with damage to nasal cartilaginous and bony structures.

== Signs and symptoms ==
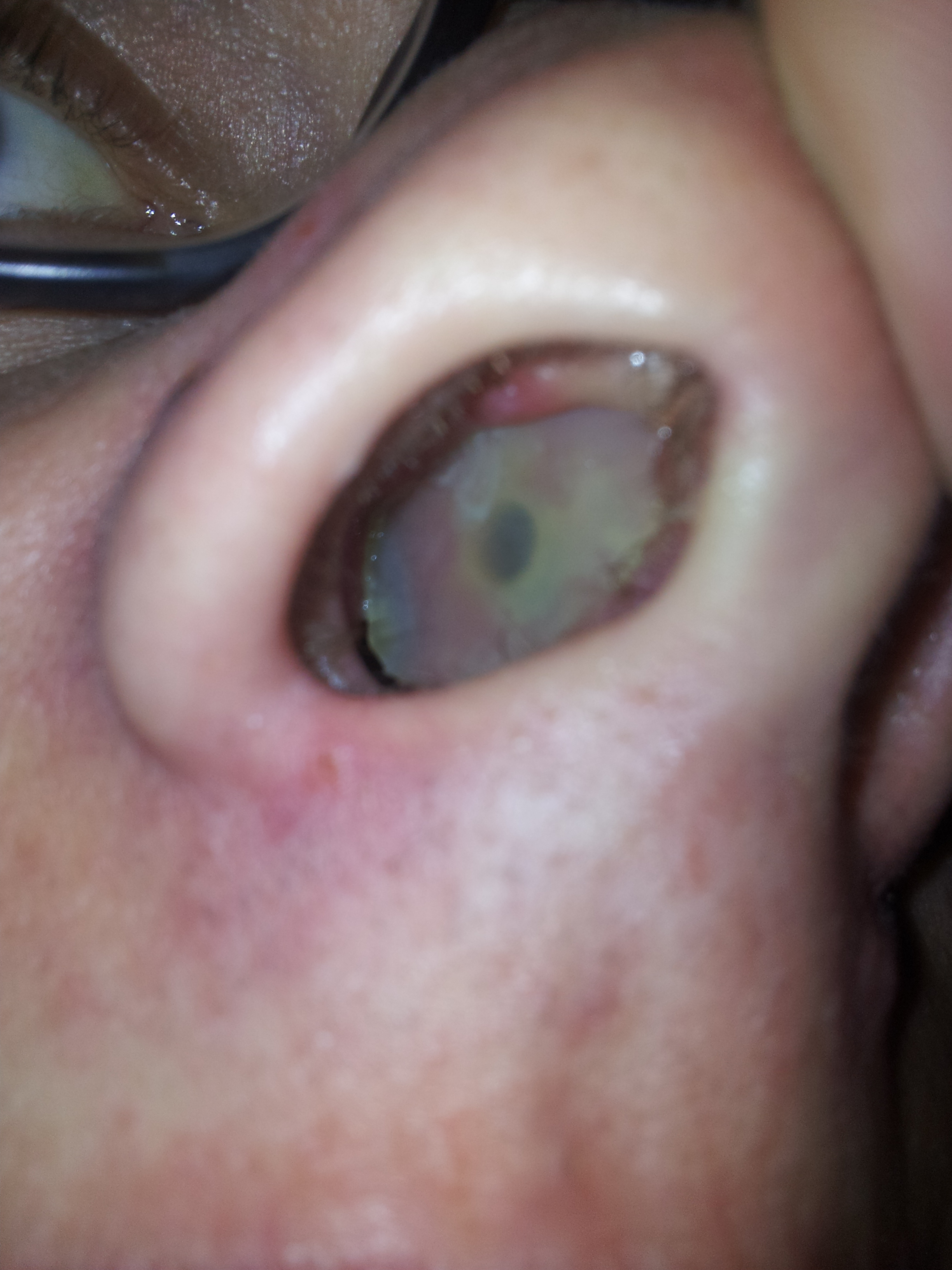
Nasal septum perforation caused by cocaine insufflation (pictured) can progress to cocaine-induced midline destructive lesions

Patients with CIMDL present with chronic nasal obstruction, hyposmia, nose bleeding, and severe facial pain. More advanced cases present nasal septal perforation, diffuse necrotizing ulcerative lesions, nasal deformation, and palatal perforation.

Due to its non-specific symptomatology, CIMDL is easily confused with other diseases such as infections, autoimmune, and granulomatous diseases, albeit with some absent systemic symptoms such as fever, arthralgia, myalgia, CIMDL can be differentiated from systemic conditions. Other markers for CIMDL include perinuclear anti-neutrophil cytoplasmic antibody (ANCA) and neutrophil elastase specific ANCA.

== Pathophysiology ==
Although not entirely understood, CIMDL is thought to be caused mainly by the vasoconstricting effects of cocaine, which induces ischemia and subsequent necrosis of the mucosal lining, followed by damage to nasal cartilaginous and bony structures. Cocaine is also capable of inducing apoptosis of epithelial cells in a dose- and time- dependent manner, which may also contribute to the inflammatory tissue response against cocaine.

The insufflation of cocaine crystals may also cause physical trauma to epithelial cells, leading to inflammatory lesions, which may also worsen due to the tendency for patients to physically remove the scabs produced in the damaged tissue, which induces further mechanical damage.

== Treatment ==
The only reliable treatment of CIMDL is cessation of cocaine abuse, which is considered a necessary prerequisite for surgical reconstruction. If abstention can be achieved, reconstructive surgery, prosthetics and medical therapy can achieve satisfactory results. Conservative treatment consists of regular saline douches, debridement of necrotic tissue and administration of antibiotics.

== See also ==
- Cocaine dependence
