= Drugwipe test =

Type of surface, sweat, or saliva drug test

Securetec AG
- Native name: Securetec Detektions-Systeme AG
- Founded: 1995
- Headquarters: Lilienthalstrasse 7, Neubiberg, Germany 85579
- Website: http://securetec.net

The DrugWipe is a test used to wipe surfaces for traces of drug residue. It may also be used for sweat or saliva testing of individuals. DrugWipe was named a finalist in the 2011 Cygnus Law Enforcement Group Innovation Awards competition. The DrugWipe 6s (saliva only) test was entered under the category of 'Traffic Enforcement'.

== Operation ==
The DrugWipe is a moist wipe used to detect drug residue on surfaces, or on the forehead, palm, or tongue of an individual. An integrated ampule is broken, which is the medium for transporting the collected analyte to the antigen-binding site. The DrugWipe can be configured to detect cannabis, cocaine, opiates, amphetamines, MDMA, and benzodiazepines. Immunoassay strips containing antibodies bind to components of the different drugs.

== Reliability ==
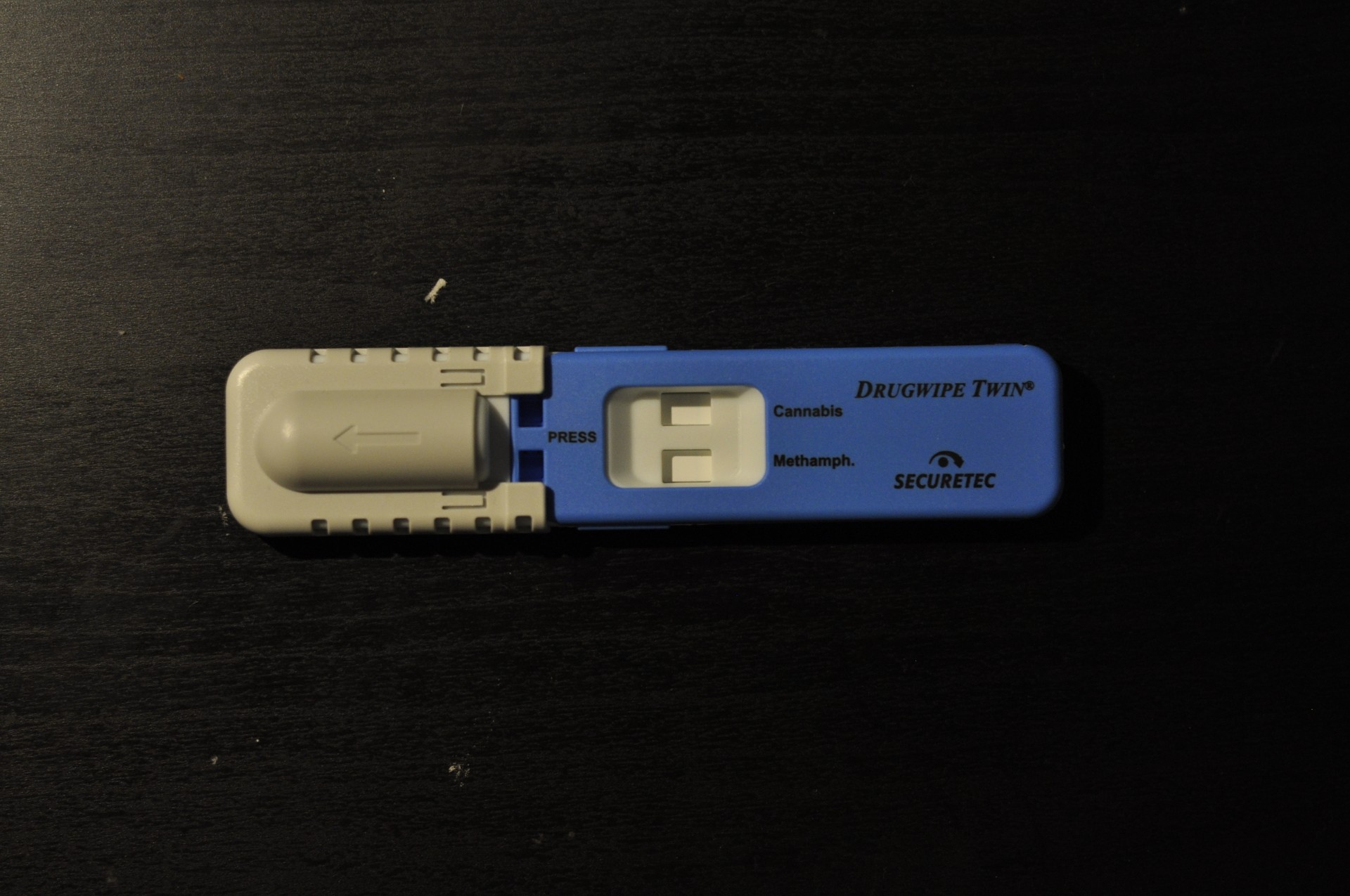
Securetec cannabis and methamphetamine

A number of independent studies examine the efficacy of the DrugWipe, particularly for its lack of sensitivity for detecting Cannabis (delta-9-thc) which the Australian National Health Survey 2009 listed as the most frequently used illicit drug at 10.4% with 36% smoking at least once a week or more in 2016. Independent field testing of the DrugWipe in Finland recorded a high rate of false negatives, particularly for Cannabis, this is where a person tests negative however had recently used 14.4%. including the sensitivity of less than 50%. According to statistics by the National Institute for Health and Welfare in Finland, of positive results for cannabis, cocaine, and opioids, two-thirds were false compared to blood samples. As positive test results have been used as sufficient grounds for a ban on driving, the Finnish Parliamentary Ombudsman issued a statement condemning the practice.

THC in the saliva is said to be an index of recent cannabis smoking and closely linked to the effects of intoxication however in another study, volunteers were recruited to consume cannabis and subsequent levels of THC taken from saliva. The amounts detected were only above the level of the DrugWipe at 10 ng/ml for 70 minutes, with volunteers reporting feeling intoxicated for a further 2 hours.

As this 1999 DEA Bulletin shows, Drugwipe is still effective when testing 'black cocaine' even when chemical tests fail to detect it.

"At three checkpoints organized by the Swiss police in Bern, 61 drivers were tested for the presence of drugs of abuse using the Drugwipe 5 device. In parallel, oral fluid was collected with the Intercept DOA Oral Specimen Collection device and tested by gas chromatography-mass spectrometry (GC-MS) after methylation of THC (limit of quantitation 1 ng/mL)

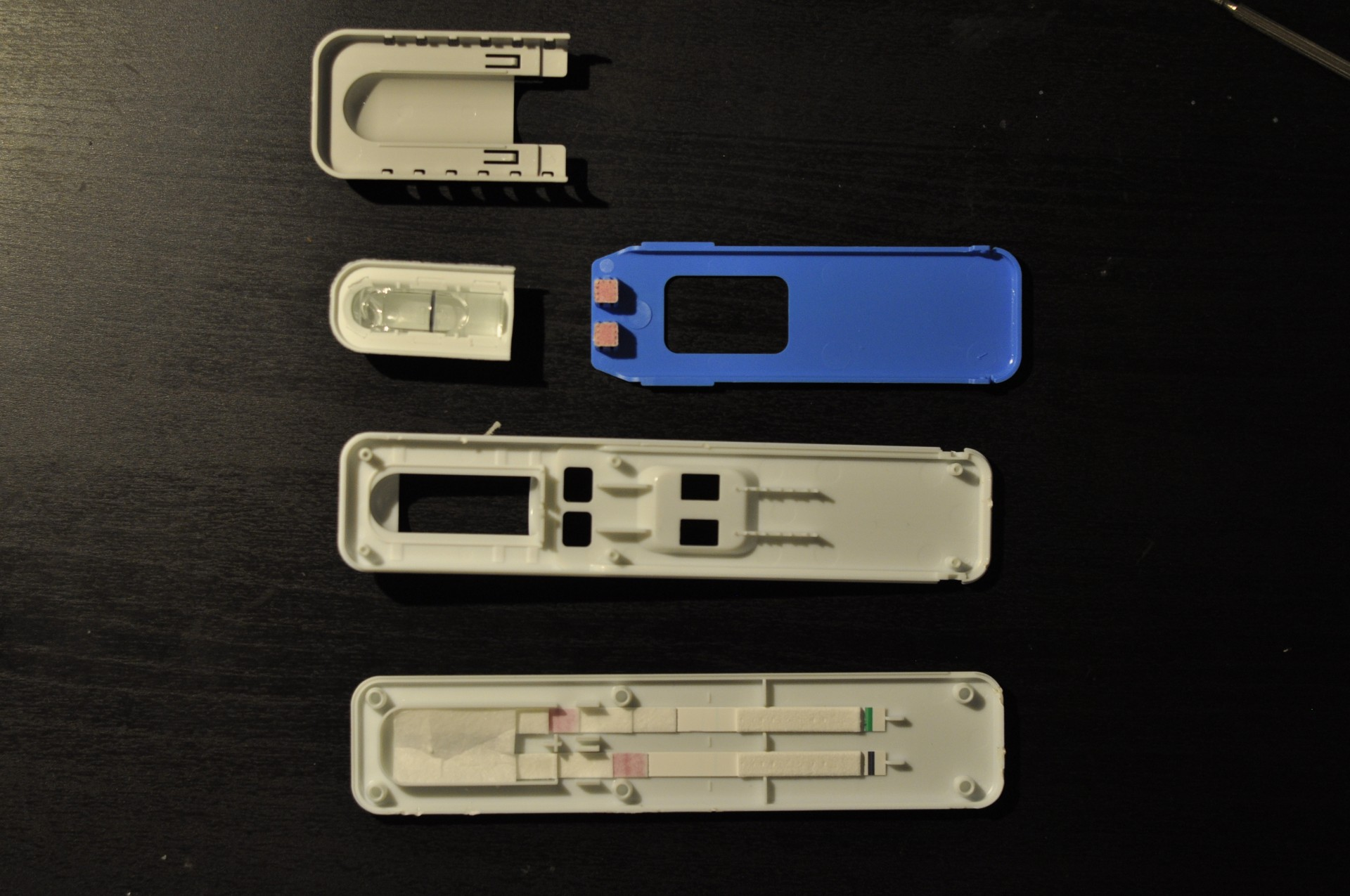
Securetec cannabis and methamphetamine drug test opened

The Drugwipe device identified 1 exposed driver, but with GC-MS, 18 drivers tested positive. THC concentrations in the Intercept buffer ranged from 2.1 to 205.1 ng/mL. These concentrations represent about 1/2 to 1/3 the authentic THC concentrations in oral fluid because of the dilution by the blue liquid of the device. Two main limitations of oral fluid were 1. the amount of matrix collected is smaller when compared to urine, and 2. the levels of drugs in urine are higher than in oral fluid. A current limitation of the use of this specimen for roadside testing is the absence of a suitable immunoassay that detects the parent compound in sufficiently low concentrations."

"The three tested on-site screening devices, Mavand RapidSTAT®, Securetec Drugwipe-5+® and Dräger DrugTest 5000® were able to detect about 70% of all cocaine and cannabis users in a roadside setting. Amphetamine/MDMA users were detected more easily, with a sensitivity higher than 92%. The sensitivity of oral fluid screening tests for THC is increasing as manufacturers are still trying to lower the cut-off of their devices. First results using the new DrugTest 5000 test cassette® demonstrate that a sensitivity of 93% is possible."

Drugwipe tests from saliva used by Finnish police have been found to be unreliable. According to statistics by the National Institute for Health and Welfare in Finland, of positive results for cannabis, cocaine and opioids, two-thirds were false compared to a blood test. As positive test results have been used as sufficient grounds for a ban on driving, the Finnish Parliamentary Ombudsman issued a statement condemning the practice.
