= Nasal septum deviation =

Disorder of the nose

Deviated septum
- Other names: Deviated nasal septum (DNS)
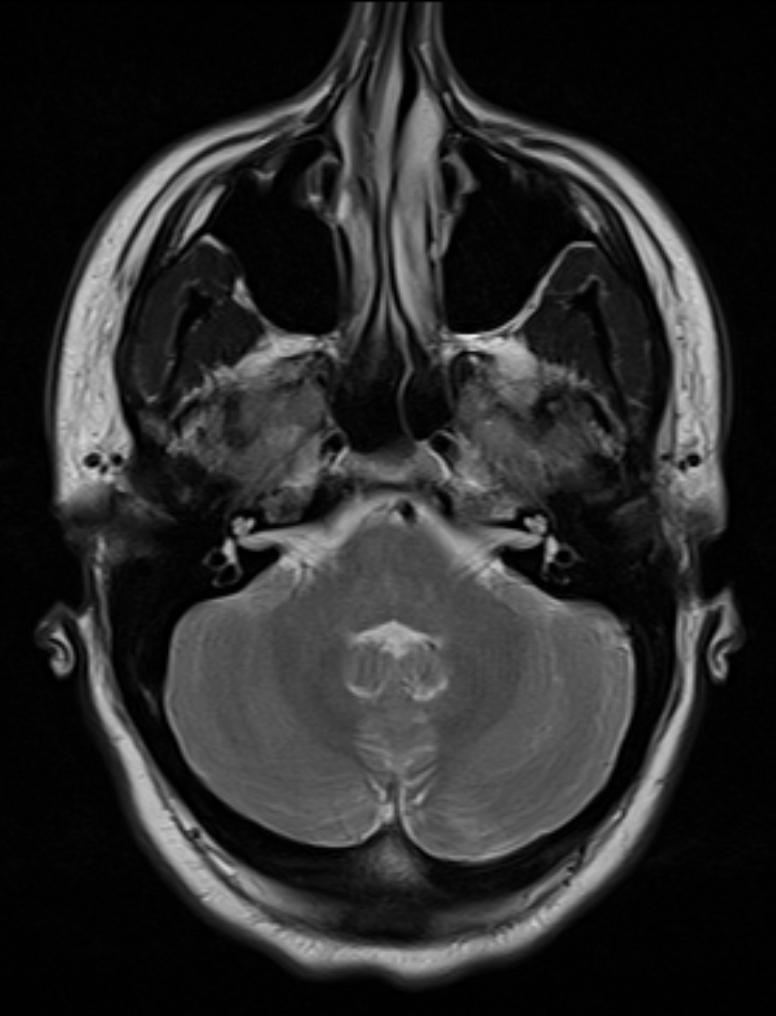
- An MRI image showing a congenitally deviated nasal septum, bowed to the left between the eye sockets
- Specialty: Otorhinolaryngology

Nasal septum deviation is a physical disorder of the nose, involving a displacement of the nasal septum. Some displacement is common, affecting 80% of people, mostly without their knowledge.

== Signs and symptoms ==
The nasal septum is the bone and cartilage in the nose that separates the nasal cavity into the two nostrils. The cartilage is called the quadrangular cartilage and the bones comprising the septum include the maxillary crest, vomer, and the perpendicular plate of the ethmoid. Normally, the septum lies centrally, and thus the nasal passages are symmetrical. A deviated septum is an abnormal condition in which the top of the cartilaginous ridge leans to the left or the right, causing obstruction of the affected nasal passage.

It is common for nasal septa to depart from the exact centerline; the septum is only considered deviated if the shift is substantial or causes problems. By itself, a deviated septum can go undetected for years and thus be without any need for correction.

Symptoms of a deviated septum include infections of the sinus and sleep apnea, snoring, repetitive sneezing, facial pain, nosebleeds, mouth breathing, difficulty with breathing, mild to severe loss of the ability to smell, and possibly headaches. Only more severe cases of a deviated septum will cause symptoms of difficulty breathing and require treatment.

== Causes ==
A deviated septum is most frequently caused by unequal growth of the septum, causing it to lean more to one side than the other. It can also be a congenital disorder, in which the septum is unequal at birth. This can get worse with age as the septum continues to grow. A deviated septum can also be caused by impact trauma, such as by a blow to the face during contact sports or a car accident. Childbirth can also cause sufficient trauma to cause a deviated septum in infants. Injuries such as a broken nose can also contribute to septal deviation, but it does not always accompany a septum injury. Deviated septum is associated with genetic connective tissue disorders such as Marfan syndrome, homocystinuria and Ehlers–Danlos syndrome.

== Diagnosis ==
Nasal septum deviation is the most common cause of nasal obstruction. A history of trauma to the nose is often present including trauma from the process of birth or microfractures. A medical professional, such as an otorhinolaryngologist (ears, nose, and throat doctor), typically makes the diagnosis after taking a thorough history from the affected person and performing a physical examination. Imaging of the nose is sometimes used to aid in making the diagnosis as well. An otorhinolaryngologist may observe the septum by performing a nasal endoscopy. In this procedure, the surgeon uses a light and camera at the end of a flexible or rigid tube observe the structure of the nasal septum deeper in the nose. Typically, a topical decongestant and numbing medicine are used to allow better visualization and comfort.

== Treatment ==
Medical therapy with nasal sprays including decongestants, antihistamines, or nasal corticosteroid sprays is typically tried first before considering a surgical approach to correct nasal septum deviation. Medication temporarily relieves symptoms, but does not correct the underlying condition. Non-medical relief can also be obtained using nasal strips.

The cartilaginous nasal septum is covered by a mucosal layer, and temporary swelling of this mucosa can exaggerate the apparent severity of septal deviation. Such edema may result from allergic rhinitis, upper respiratory tract infections, chronic rhinitis, or acute sinusitis. Addressing these conditions and conducting nasal endoscopic examinations at different times can help in assessing the actual structural deviation more accurately.

A minor surgical procedure known as septoplasty can cure symptoms related to septal deviations. The surgery lasts roughly one hour and does not result in any cosmetic alteration or external scars. Nasal congestion, pain, drainage or swelling may occur within the first few days after the surgery. Recovery from the procedure may take anywhere from two days to four weeks to heal completely. Septal bones never regrow. If symptoms reappear they are not related to deviations. Reappearance of symptoms may be due to mucosal metaplasia of the nose. There are times also when the surgery also may be unsuccessful, leading to a continuation of the symptoms.

A randomised controlled trial found that people who had septoplasty had a greater improvement in their symptoms and quality of life after 6 months than people who managed their nasal airway obstruction with nasal sprays.

=== Complications of septoplasty ===
- Adhesions and synechiae between septal mucosa and lateral nasal wall
- Dropped nasal tip due to resection of the caudal margin
- External nasal deformity
- Incomplete correction with persistent nasal symptoms
- Nasal septum perforation due to bilateral trauma of the mucoperichondrial flaps opposite each other.
- Saddle nose due to over-resection of the dorsal wall of the septal cartilage
- Scarring inside the nose and nose bleeding
- Septal hematoma and septal abscess

== Notable examples ==
- Jennifer Aniston
- Ashley Tisdale
- Josh Hutcherson
- Cameron Diaz
- Ed Miliband

== See also ==
- Nasal septum perforation
- Nasal strip
