= Wilhelm Kiesselbach =

German physician (1839–1902)

Wilhelm Kiesselbach (1 December 1839 – 4 August 1902) was a German otolaryngologist born in Hanau.

From 1859 he studied medicine at the universities of Göttingen, Marburg and Tübingen. In 1877/78 he worked as assistant under Wilhelm Olivier Leube in the polyclinic at the University of Erlangen. In 1880 he obtained his habilitation and in 1888 became an associate professor. He was director of otolaryngology at the university clinic in Erlangen from 1889 to 1902.

His name is associated with the eponymous Kiesselbach's plexus, which is the site where the anterior ethmoid artery, greater palatine artery, sphenopalatine artery and superior labial artery anastomose in the anteroinferior part of the nasal septum.

== Written works ==
- Untersuchungen über die Anatomie des Schläfenbeins (Studies on the anatomy of the temporal bone).
- Galvanische Reizung des Nervus acusticus (Electrical stimulation of the vestibulocochlear nerve).
- Nasenbluten (Epistaxis).
- Zur Histologie der Ohrpolypen (Histology of ear polyps).
- Über Beziehungen zwischen Acusticus und Trigeminus (Relationship between the acusticus and trigeminus).

He also edited the section on diseases of the nose and pharynx for Penzoldt-Stintzing's "Handbuch der Therapie".
