= Septoplasty =

Corrective surgical procedure

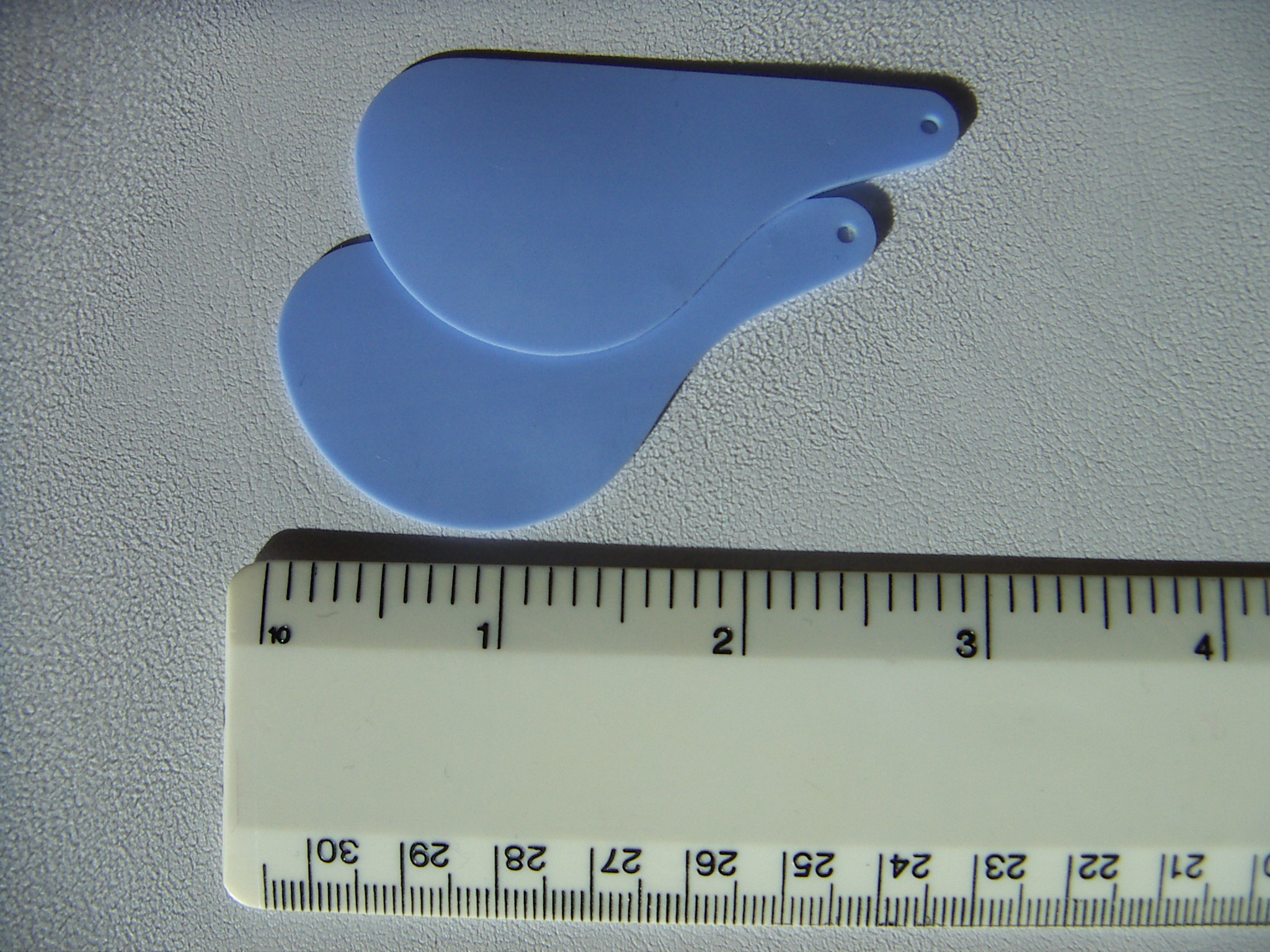
- Typical flexible splints that may be used in septoplasty. They are held in place in the nose with a stitch through the hole, and are typically removed seven to 10 days after surgery.
- ICD-9-CM: 21.5, 21.88
- MedlinePlus: 003012

Septoplasty (Latin: saeptum, "septum" + Ancient Greek: πλάσσειν, romanized: plassein, "to shape"), or alternatively submucous septal resection and septal reconstruction, is a corrective surgical procedure done to straighten a deviated nasal septum – the nasal septum being the partition between the two sides of the nasal cavity. Ideally, the septum should run down the center of the nose. When it deviates into one of the cavities, it narrows that cavity and impedes airflow. Deviated nasal septum or "crooked" internal nose can occur at childbirth or as the result of an injury or other trauma. If the wall that functions as a separator of both sides of the nose is tilted towards one side at a degree greater than 50%, it might cause difficulty breathing. Often the inferior turbinate on the opposite side enlarges, which is termed compensatory hypertrophy. Deviations of the septum can lead to nasal obstruction. Most surgeries are completed in 60 minutes or less, while the recovery time could be up to several weeks. Put simply, septoplasty is a surgery that helps repair the passageways in the nose making it easier to breathe. This surgery is usually performed on patients with a deviated septum, recurrent rhinitis, or sinus issues.

== Procedure ==
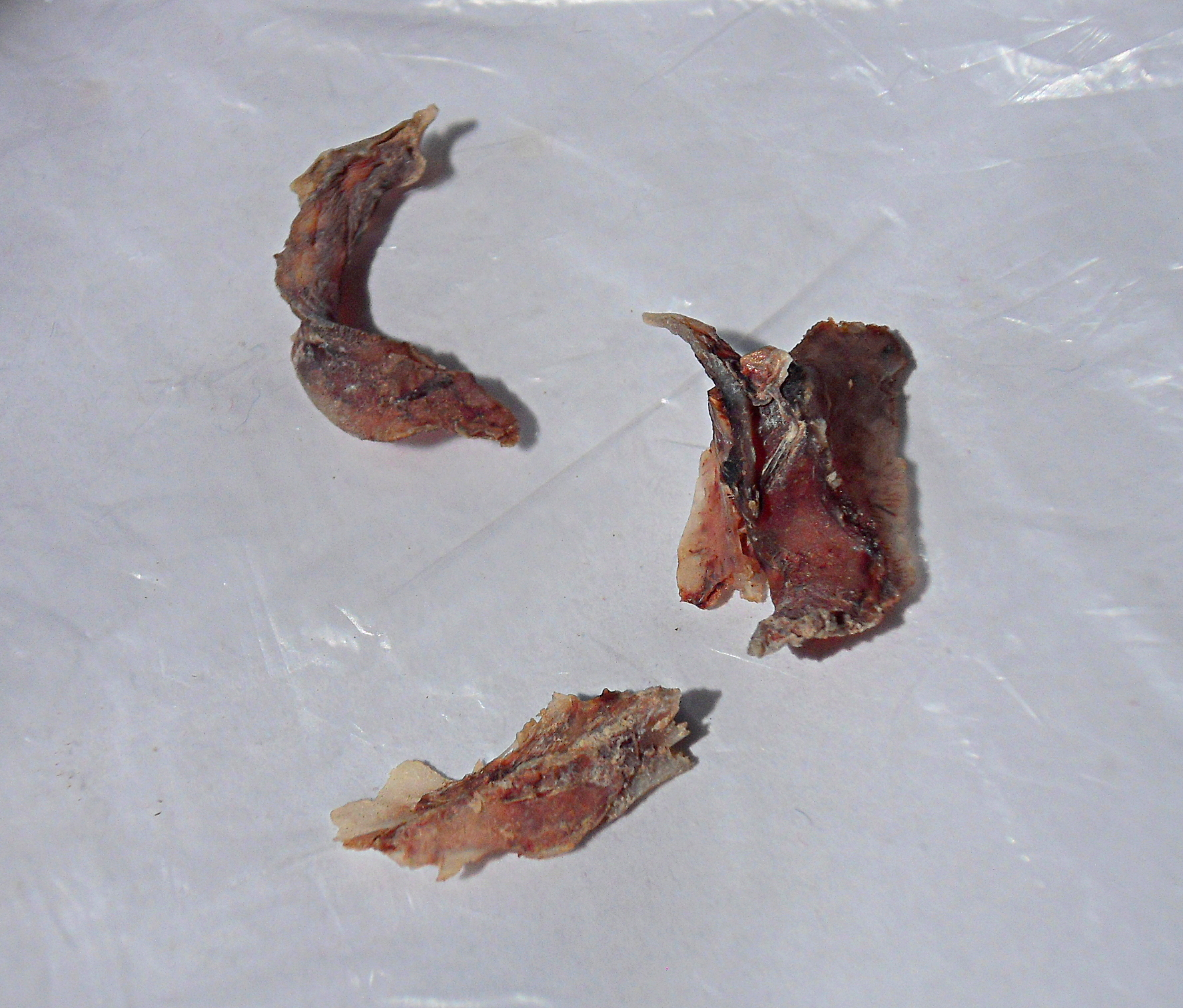
Pieces removed from nasal cavities during septoplasty

The procedure usually involves a judicious excision/realignment of a portion of the bone and/or cartilage in the nasal cavity. Under general or local anesthesia, the surgeon works through the nostrils, making an incision in the lining of the septum to reach the cartilage or bone targeted in the operation. This may be performed using an endoscope or with open techniques. Sufficient cartilage and bone is preserved for structural support. After the septum is straightened, it may then be stabilized temporarily with small plastic tubes, splints, or sutures internally. Skin grafts can be placed internally to support the internal structures.

=== Indications ===
Apart from in patients with deviated nasal septum causing airway obstruction leading to difficulty with breathing, recurrent rhinitis, or sinusitis, septoplasty is done as an approach to hypophysectomy. It is sometimes done as well to cure recurrent epistaxis (nosebleed) due to septal spur.

=== Contraindications ===
Septoplasty should not be done in acute nasal or sinus infection. It should also be avoided if the person has untreated diabetes, severe hypertension or bleeding diathesis.

=== Post-operation ===
Unless there are unusual complications, there is no swelling or discoloration of the external nose or face with septoplasty alone. Packing is rare with modern surgical techniques, but splinting the inside of the nose for a few days is common; the splints are not visible externally. Patients who have nasal splints should receive prophylactic antibiotics against gram positive organisms to prevent possible toxic shock syndrome. One percent of patients can experience excessive bleeding afterwards — the risk period lasts up to two weeks. This could require packing or cautery, but is generally handled safely and without compromise of the ultimate surgical result. Septal perforation and septal hematoma are possible, as is a decrease in the sense of smell. Temporary numbness of the front upper teeth after surgery is common. Sometimes the numbness extends to the upper jaw and the tip of the nose. This almost always resolves within several months.

The nasal tissues should mostly stabilize within 3-6 months post-surgery, although shifting is still possible for up to and over a year afterward.

A randomised controlled trial found that people who had septoplasty had a greater improvement in their symptoms and quality of life after 6 months than people who managed their nasal airway obstruction with nasal sprays.

=== Complications of septoplasty ===
- Dropped nasal tip due to resection of the caudal margin.
- Empty nose syndrome due to resection or removal of the turbinates.
- Septal perforation due to the bilateral trauma of the mucoperichondrial flaps opposite each other.
- Septal hematoma and septal abscess.
- Adhesions and synechiae between septal mucosa and lateral nasal wall.
- Saddle nose due to over-resection of the dorsal wall of the septal cartilage.

== See also ==
- Rhinoplasty, surgery involving the entire nose
- Turbinectomy
- Empty nose syndrome
- Nose
