= Vestibulitis =

Vestibulitis may refer to:

- Labyrinthitis, a problem of the inner ear
- Nasal vestibulitis, diffuse dermatitis of the nasal vestibule
- Vulvar vestibulitis, vulvodynia localized to the vestibule region
