= Sphenoidal process of palatine bone =

Thin, compressed plate

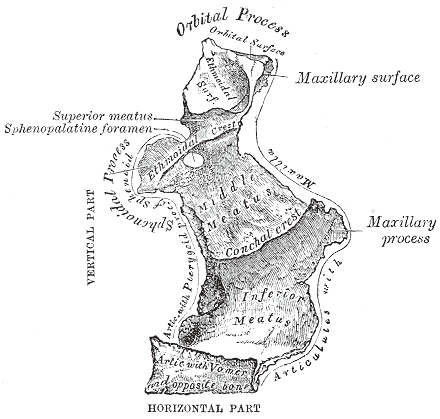
- Left palatine bone. Nasal aspect. Enlarged.

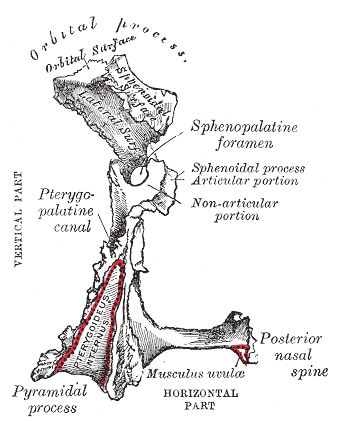
- Left palatine bone. Posterior aspect. Enlarged.

Details

Identifiers
- Latin: processus sphenoidalis
- TA98: A02.1.13.012
- TA2: 810
- FMA: 59146

The sphenoidal process of palatine bone is a thin, superomedially directed plate of bone. It is smaller and more inferior compared to the orbital process of palatine bone.

== Anatomy ==
=== Surfaces ===
- The superior surface articulates with the root of the pterygoid process and the under surface of the sphenoidal concha, its medial border reaching as far as the ala of the vomer; it presents a groove which contributes to the formation of the pharyngeal canal.
- The medial surface is concave, and forms part of the lateral wall of the nasal cavity.
- The lateral surface is divided into an articular and a non-articular portion: the former is rough, for articulation with the medial pterygoid plate; the latter is smooth, and forms part of the pterygopalatine fossa.

=== Borders ===
- The anterior border forms the posterior boundary of the sphenopalatine notch.
- The posterior border, serrated at the expense of the outer table, articulates with the vaginal process of the medial pterygoid plate of sphenoid bone.
- The medial border articulates with ala of vomer.

The orbital and sphenoidal processes are separated from one another by the sphenopalatine notch. Sometimes the two processes are united above, and form between them a complete foramen, or the notch may be crossed by one or more spicules of bone, giving rise to two or more foramina.

== Additional images ==
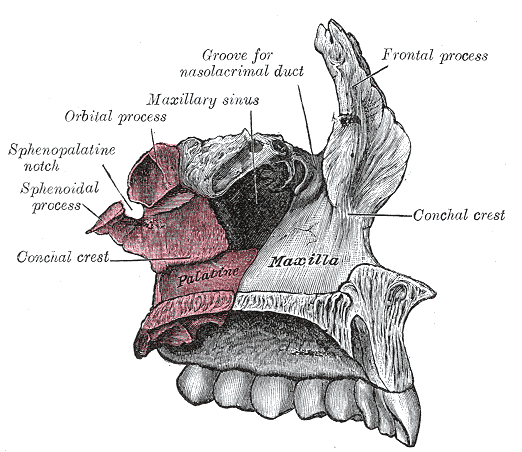
Articulation of left palatine bone with maxilla.

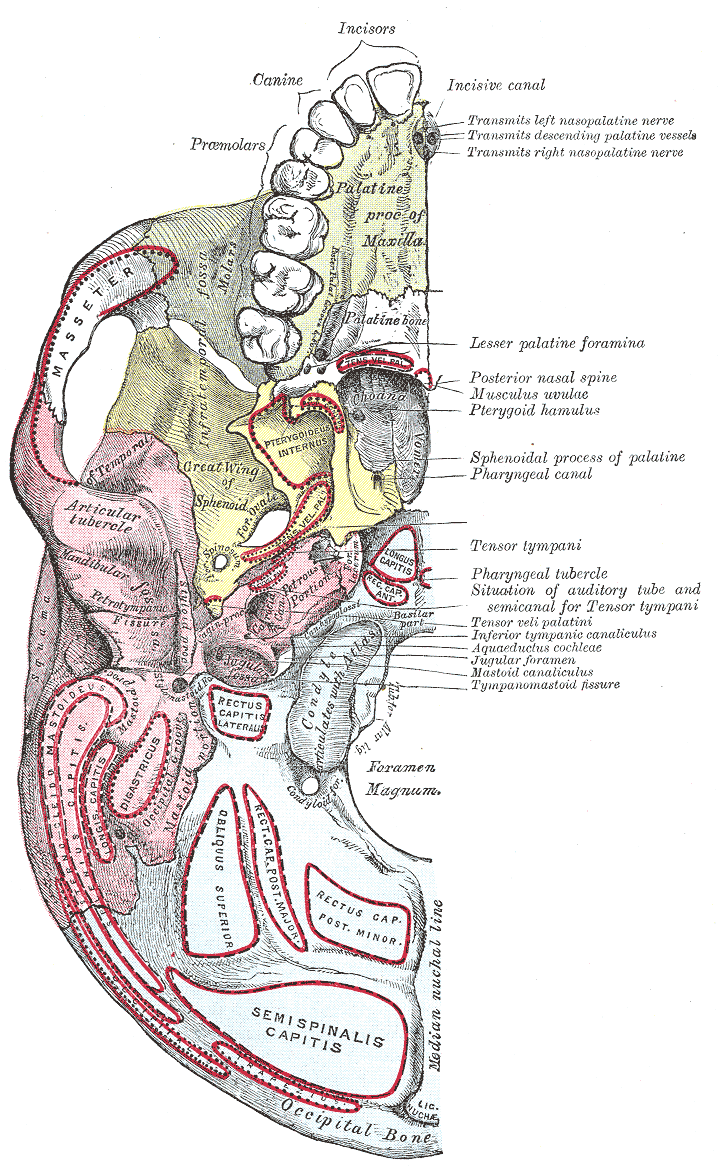
Base of skull. Inferior surface.
