= Posterior lateral nasal arteries =

Details
- Source: Sphenopalatine artery

Identifiers
- Latin: arteriae nasales posteriores laterales
- TA98: A12.2.05.089
- TA2: 4461
- FMA: 71689

The sphenopalatine artery passes through the sphenopalatine foramen into the cavity of the nose, at the back part of the superior meatus. Here it gives off its posterior lateral nasal branches which spread forward over the conchæ and meatuses, anastomose with the ethmoidal arteries and the nasal branches of the descending palatine, and assist in supplying the frontal, maxillary, ethmoidal, and sphenoidal sinuses.
