= Woodruff's plexus =

Arterio-venous plexus at lateral wall of nose

Woodruff's plexus was discovered by George H. Woodruff in 1949. The plexus is located below the posterior end of the inferior concha, on the lateral wall of the nasal cavity. He described it as the naso-nasopharyngeal plexus.

== Structure ==
Woodruff's plexus is located on the lateral wall of the nasal cavity below the posterior end of the inferior nasal concha (turbinate). The plexus contains both arteries and veins which lie in a thin mucosa. The major arteries supplying the plexus are the sphenopalatine artery and ascending pharyngeal artery. The internal maxillary vein is also within the plexus.

== Clinical significance ==
=== Bleeding ===
A nosebleed (epistaxis) usually occurs in the anterior part of the nose from an area known as Kiesselbach's plexus which consists of arteries. Woodruff's plexus is a venous plexus in the posterior part and a nosebleed here accounts for only between 5 and 10 per cent of nosebleeds. Older adults are most often affected.

Risk factors for nosebleed in Woodruff's plexus
Local	Systemic
Trauma; Sinusitis and allergies; Surgeries	Hypertension; Deficiency in clotting factors; Immunodeficiency; Anticoagulants such as warfarin and aspirin; Thrombocytopenia; Liver or kidney failure and vitamin C deficiency

=== Treatment ===
Posterior nasal packing is needed for posterior epistaxis.
