= Palatomaxillary suture =

Joint between the maxilla and palatine bone

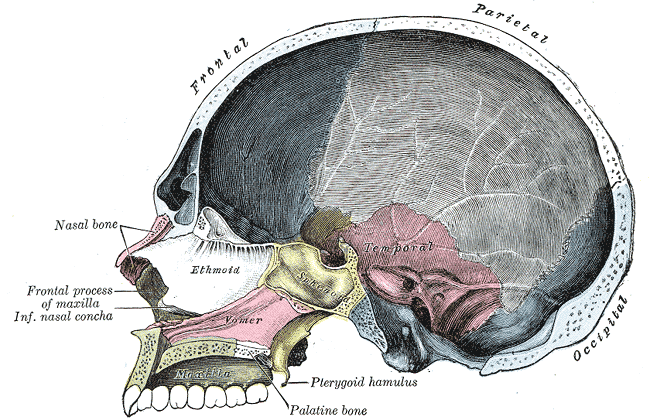
- Sagittal section of skull.

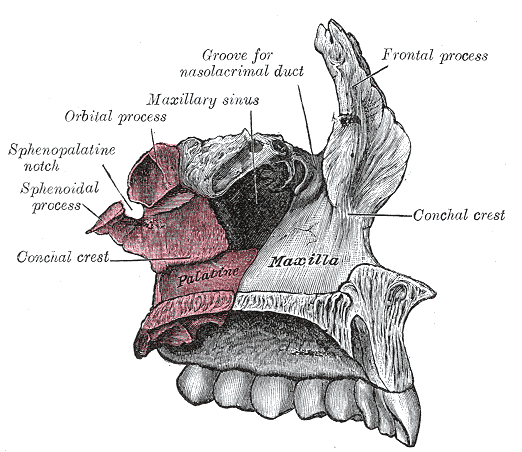
- Articulation of left palatine bone with maxilla.

Details

Identifiers
- Latin: sutura palatomaxillaris
- TA98: A03.1.02.030
- TA2: 1606
- FMA: 52964

The palatomaxillary suture is a suture separating the maxilla from the palatine bone.

== Additional images ==
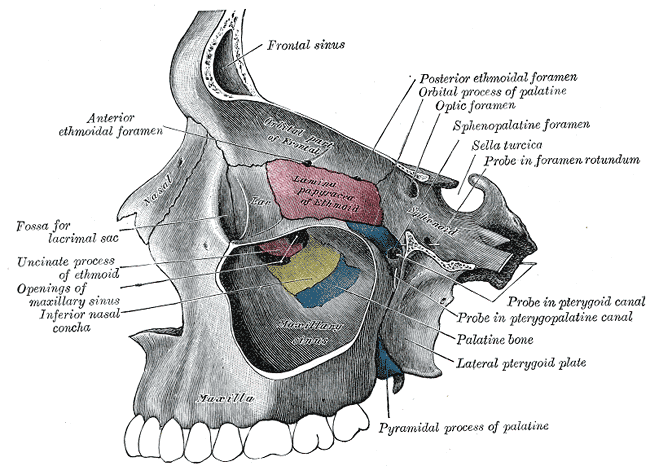
Medial wall of left orbit.
