= Rosenbach's sign =

Rosenbach's sign may refer to any of the clinical signs described by Dr. Ottomar Rosenbach:

- Rosenbach's sign (liver), systolic pulsations of the liver in aortic regurgitation; see Ottomar Rosenbach
- Rosenbach's sign (eye), tremor of the eyelids in Grave's disease; see Ottomar Rosenbach
- Rosenbach's sign (hemiplegia), absence of abdominal reflex on one side of the abdomen in cerebral hemiplegia; see Abdominal examination § Other tests and special maneuvers
