= Gumprecht =

Gumprecht is a German-language given name and surname. Notable people with the name include:

- Gumprecht II of Neuenahr (1400–1484)
- André Gumprecht (born 1974), German footballer
- Ferdinand Gumprecht (1864–1947), German internist
