= Perpendicular plate =

Perpendicular plate can refer to:

- Perpendicular plate of ethmoid bone
- Perpendicular plate of palatine bone
