= Sphenopalatine foramen =

Foramen in the skull

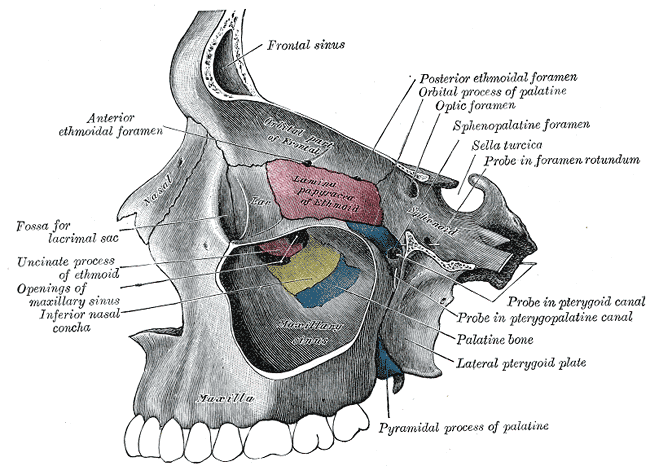
- Medial wall of left orbit. (Sphenopalatine foramen labeled in upper right.)

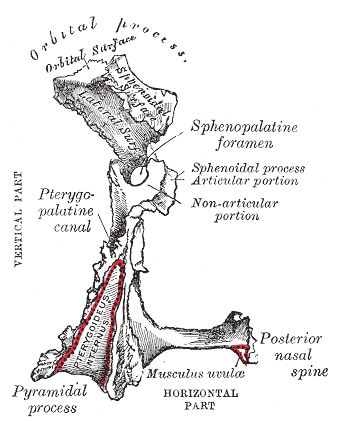
- Left palatine bone. Posterior aspect. Enlarged. (Sphenopalatine foramen labeled in upper right.)

Details

Identifiers
- Latin: foramen sphenopalatinum
- TA98: A02.1.00.097
- TA2: 502
- FMA: 53144

The sphenopalatine foramen is a foramen of the skull that connects the nasal cavity and the pterygopalatine fossa. It gives passage to the sphenopalatine artery, nasopalatine nerve, and the superior nasal nerve (all passing from the pterygopalatine fossa into the nasal cavity).

== Structure ==
The processes of the superior border of the palatine bone are separated by the sphenopalatine notch, which is converted into the sphenopalatine foramen by the under surface of the body of the sphenoid.

The sphenopalatine foramen is situated posterior to the middle nasal meatus orbital process of palatine bone, anterior to the sphenoidal process of palatine bone, inferior to the body and concha of the sphenoid bone, and superior to the superior margin of the perpendicular plate of palatine bone.

=== Relations ===
The ethmoid crest (a reliable surgical landmark) is situated anterior to the sphenopalatine foramen.

== Additional images ==
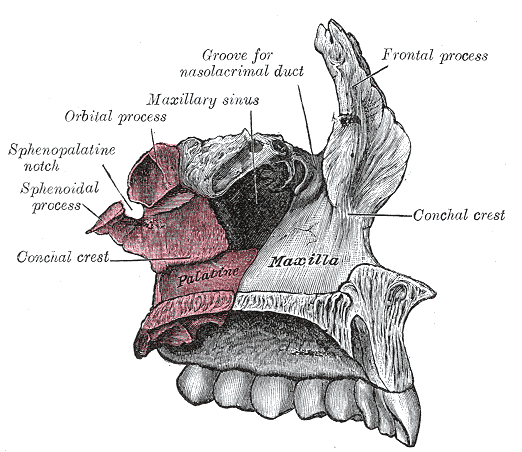
Articulation of left palatine bone with maxilla.

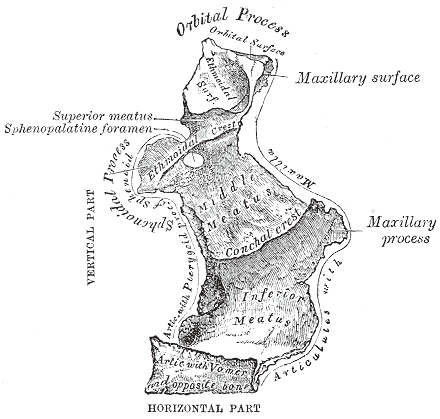
Left palatine bone. Nasal aspect. Enlarged.
