= Nasal septal hematoma =

- Other names: Nasal septal hematoma
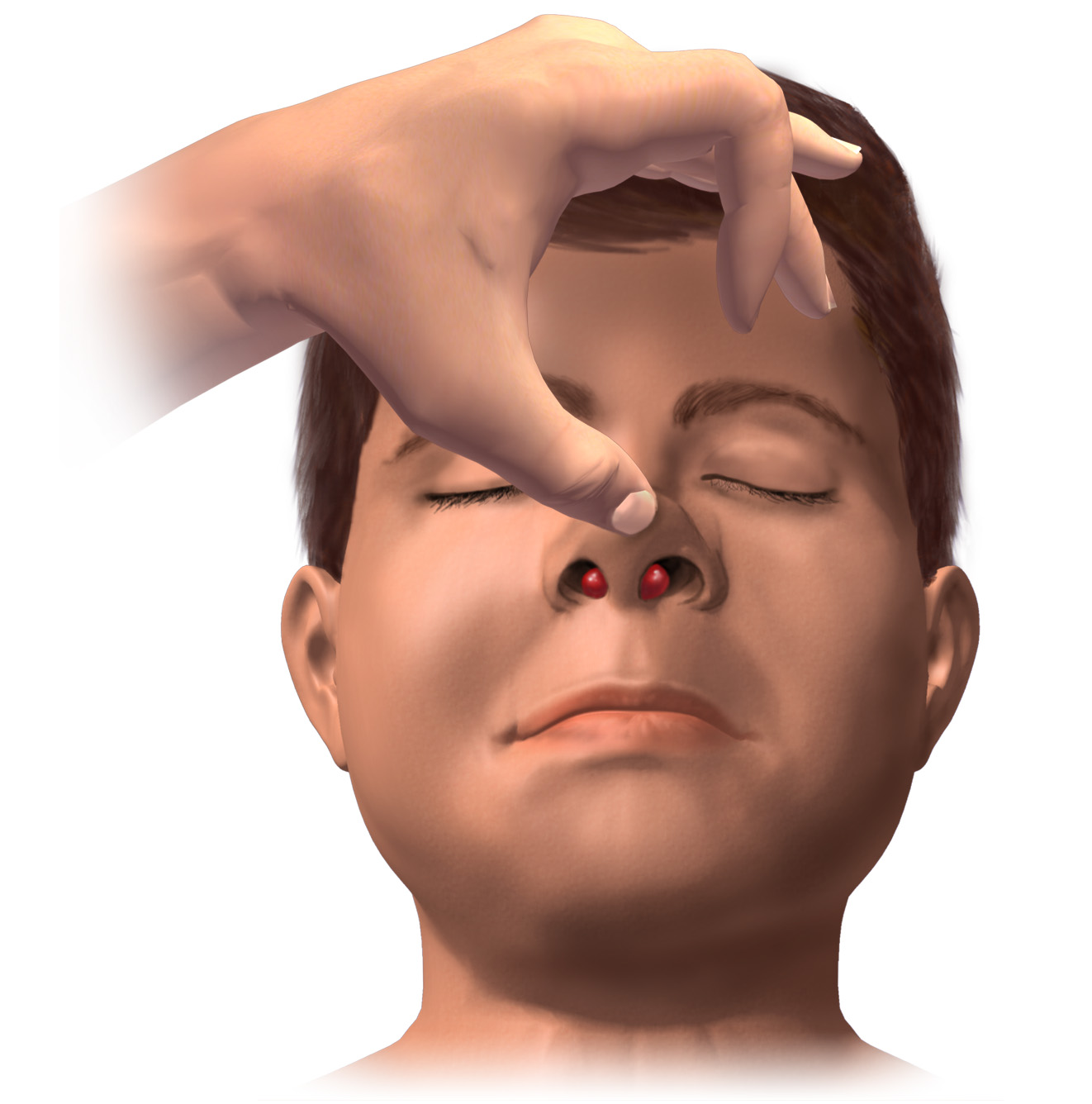
- Nasal septal hematoma
- Specialty: Otolaryngology

Nasal septal hematoma is a condition affecting the nasal septum. It can be associated with trauma.

A septal hematoma is blood that collects in the space between the septal cartilage and the overlying perichondrium (a cross section of the cartilaginous portion of the nasal septum). A hematoma may deprive the septal cartilage of its blood supply from the overlying mucosa and can lead to permanent sequelae.

The septal cartilage has no blood supply of its own and receives all of its nutrients and oxygen from the perichondrium. An untreated septal hematoma may lead to the destruction of the septum and immediate drainage is necessary. Untimely diagnosis and/or treatment of septal hematomas can cause what is called a saddle nose deformity.

This condition is more common in children because the septum is thicker and the lining more flexible.

== Signs and symptoms ==
A normal nasal septum is rigid and thin. If you have a septal hematoma, your doctor will be able to press it down with a swab as the area will be soft. A quick check in the nose will show any swelling between the nostrils.

Symptoms can include:

- blockage in breathing
- change in nose shape
- painful swelling of nasal septum
- nasal congestion.

On occasion, it is possible for people with a septal hematoma to experience headache, nausea, vomiting, and fainting.

== Causes ==
The most common causes of nasal septal hematomas include:

- broken nose (nasal fracture)
- medication
- surgery or injury to the soft tissue area.

In adults, nasal septal hematoma typically occur with significant facial trauma and/or nasal fracture. However, in children, due to their thicker septum and more flexible lining, nasal septal hematoma can be caused from minor nasal trauma such as simple falls, collisions with stationary objects, or minor altercations with siblings.

== Mechanism and pathophysiology ==
The exact mechanism for the formation of hematoma from nasal trauma is controversial, but thought to occur in nasal septal hematomas when there is forced to the nasal cartilage. The force causes the perichondrial blood vessels to leak and rupture in the nasal septum. The cartilage in the septum is avascular and can be 2–4 mm thick. The septum gets its blood supply from the ethmoid and sphenopalatine arteries.

The nasal septum is composed of cartilaginous, membranous, and bony components overlaid by mucoperichondrium and mucoperiosteum. Bleeding within the confines of the mucoperichnondrium leads to a septal hematoma, where as external bleeding from Kiesselbach's plexus results in epistaxis. The Kiesselbach plexus is located anterior inferior of the nasal septum, where the anastomosis of blood vessels is located.

Normal nasal mucosa is pink and healthy appearing, without ulcerations, crusting, or bleeding. Some common, abnormal variations include septal deviations, spurs, and an enlarged, aerated middle turbinate. Pale or inflamed mucosa, purulence, nasal polyps, or a septal perforation are all common pathologic features that may or may not be combined with the abnormal variations listed above.

== Diagnosis ==
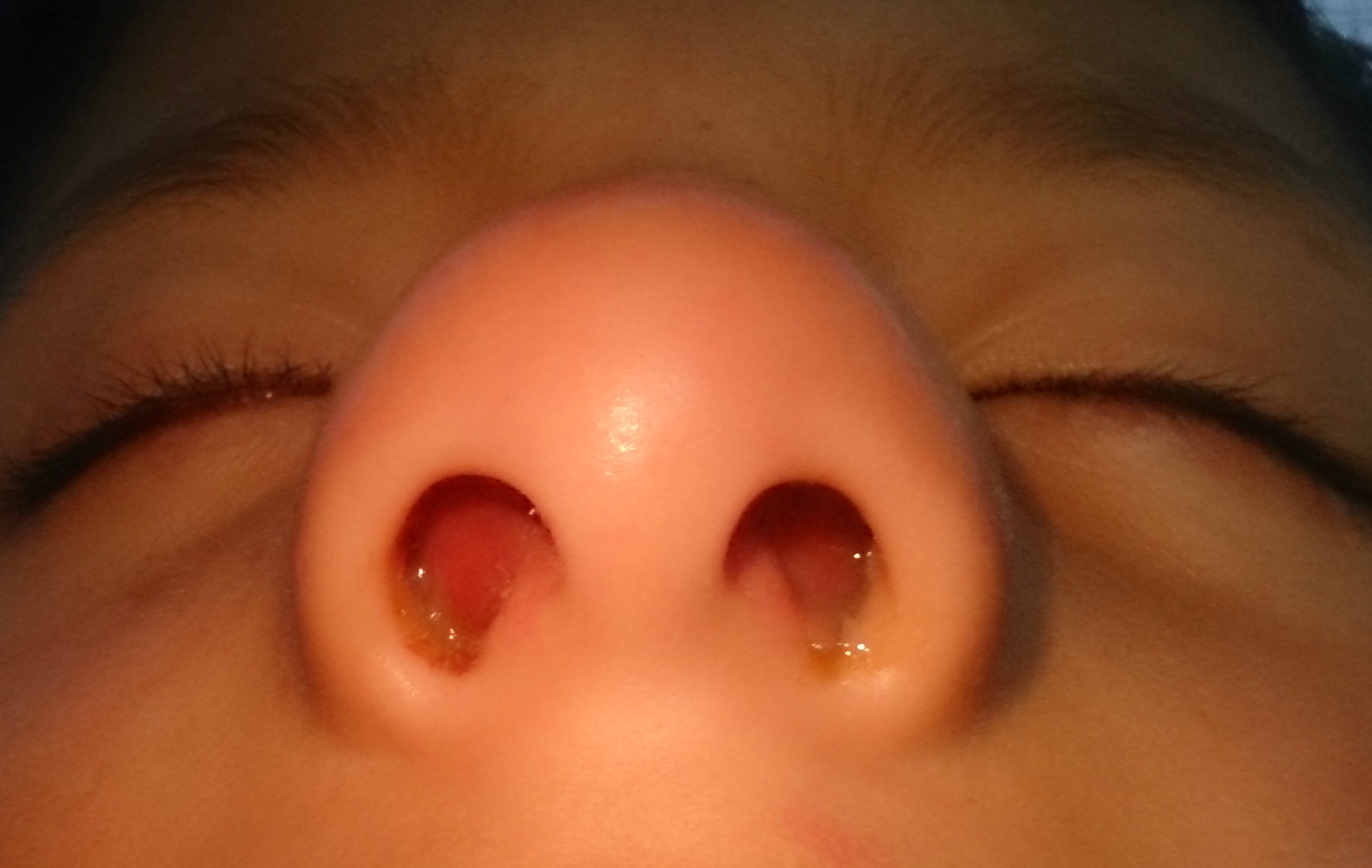
Nasal septal hematoma

The doctor will use a nasal speculum for visualization of the nasal septum, the inferior turbinate, and a portion of the middle turbinate. The view of the nasal passage may be partially obstructed by the tools used. When there is minimal obstruction, it is often possible to visualize the nasopharynx.

Identifying the Nasal Septal Hematoma

If lateral bulging of the septum and fluctuance persist after the nasal administration of a vasoconstrictive agent, such as oxymetazoline, it is a strong indicator of a nasal septal hematoma. A septal hematoma is highly likely in patients who have had trauma or a sudden onset of nasal blockage that does not resolve with the removal of blood clots and the administration of a vasoconstrictive agent.

Diagnosis can be made by a medical professional after performing an anterior rhinoscopy examination, by using an otoscope or a nasal speculum and overhead light source.

Sometimes palpation is used to diagnose the hematoma.

== Treatment ==
A septal hematoma requires urgent treatment from a physician in order to stop any further complications arising.

Prompt treatment of septal hematomas can prevent complications such as ischemia of the septal cartilage, which can lead to permanent necrosis and a saddle-nose deformity. Such complication can occur rapidly, within as few as 3 days.

There are two different procedures used to achieve this and will be selected upon the size of the swelling or clot. If the condition is being treated promptly and is still relatively small, then a small incision can be made to allow the blood to flow out. If left untreated, the hematoma can cause bacterial colonization that leads to infection. Within 72 hours, the infection can form a septal abscess.

Treating a septal hematoma requires it to be incised and drained to prevent avascular necrosis of the septal hyaline cartilage. This will depend on diffusion of nutrients from its attached nasal mucosa.

The septum can generally heal within 1 week, without any evidence of the incision. The mucosa will appear healthy and smooth.

Secondary infections can be prevented by starting the patient on an antibiotic regimen immediately after the procedure and continuing the treatment while the nasal packs are in place. If an abscess is present, a specimen of the abscess can be sent for culture to ensure that the antibiotics prescribed have provided adequate coverage. Culture-directed therapy can help avert dangerous late sequalae, including the intracranial extension of a septal abscess. If the hematoma is not promptly drained, the septal cartilage may be destroyed. In such cases, a saddle-nose deformity may develop.

== Prognosis ==
As long as the septal hematoma is treated promptly, a full recovery is common. If the condition is left untreated and develops complications such as fever, infection, or an abscess, then the nasal septal hematoma is still treatable if seen by a physician.

== Epidemiology ==
Septal hematomas are rare but can effect everyone in every age group. There is no exact number of the incidence that occur because a lot of the cases will remain undiagnosed. Although, patients that have visited an ear, nose and throat clinic for nasal septal hematomas, reported to be in between 0.8% to 1.6% of patients. 65.6% of nasal septal hematoma cases in Nigeria had unknown cause, where 30.4% were caused by trauma.

Within 10 years at the University of Nigeria Teaching Hospital, there was a total of 53 patients that ranged from 5 to 65 years of age. Consisted of 37 males and 16 females. The highest age group with nasal septal hematoma was 10–18 years of age followed by 1–9 years of age.
