= Ernst Penzoldt =

German painter

Ernst Penzoldt (14 June 1892 – 27 January 1955) was a German writer, sculptor and painter.

Penzoldt was born in Erlangen. He had three older brothers. His father Franz Penzoldt was a German professor of medicine. From 1912 he studied sculpture in Weimar, under German sculpture professor Albin Egger-Lienz. In Weimar he met his friend Günther Stolle. In 1913 Penzoldt and Stolle went to university in Kassel. During World War I Petzoldt was in the army and worked as an emergency medical technician. In 1917 his friend Stolle died on active service.

After World War I Penzoldt lived in 1919 in Munich. There he met his next partner, Ernst Heimeran. Heimeran started his own publishing company, Heimeran Verlag. During the next years Penzoldt wrote several works, which he published in Heimeran Verlag. In 1922 Penzoldt married Heimerans sister Friederike. They had two children: Günther (1923–1997) and Ulrike (born 1927). He died, aged 62, in Munich.

== Works ==
- Der Gefährte. Munich: Heimeran Verlag 1922.
- Idyllen. Munich: Heimeran Verlag 1923.
- Der Schatten Amphion. Eine fränkische Idylle. Munich: Heimeran Verlag 1924.
- Der Zwerg. Leipzig: Philipp Reclam Verlag 1927.
- Der arme Chatterton. Geschichte eines Wunderkindes. Leipzig: Insel Verlag 1928.
- Etienne und Luise. Leipzig: Philipp Reclam Verlag 1929.
- Die Powenzbande. Zoologie einer Familie, gemeinverständlich dargestellt. Berlin: Propyläen Verlag 1930.
- Die Portugalesische Schlacht. Komödie der Unsterblichkeit. Berlin: Propyläen Verlag 1930.
- Die Portugalesische Schlacht. Novellen. Munich: Piper Verlag 1930.
- Kleiner Erdenwurm. Romantische Erzählung. Berlin: S. Fischer Verlag 1934.
- Idolino. Berlin: S. Fischer Verlag 1935.
- Der dankbare Patient. Berlin: S. Fischer Verlag 1937.
- Die Leute aus der Mohrenapotheke. Berlin: S. Fischer Verlag 1938.
- Korporal Mombour. Eine Soldatenromanze. Berlin: S. Fischer Verlag 1941.
- Episteln. Berlin: Suhrkamp Verlag 1942.
- Zugänge. Berlin: Suhrkamp Verlag 1947.
- Causerien. Frankfurt/M.: Suhrkamp Verlag 1949.
- Süsse Bitternis. Frankfurt/M.: Suhrkamp Verlag 1951.
- Drei Romane. Frankfurt/M.: Suhrkamp Verlag 1952.
- Squirrel. Erzählung. Berlin und Frankfurt/M.: Suhrkamp Verlag 1954.
- Die Liebende und andere Prosa aus dem Nachlaß. Frankfurt/M.: Suhrkamp Verlag 1958.
- Dramen. Frankfurt/M.: Suhrkamp Verlag 1962.
- Jubiläumsausgabe zum 100. Geburtstag von Ernst Penzoldt in sieben Bänden. Frankfurt/M.: Suhrkamp Verlag 1992.

== Literature ==
- Christian Klein: Ernst Penzoldt - Harmonie aus Widersprüchen. Leben und Werk (1892-1955). Cologne and Weimar (Böhlau). 2006, ISBN 3-412-34205-X.
- Stadtmuseum und Stadtarchiv Erlangen (Hg.): Ernst Penzoldt. Kunst und Poesie. Erlangen (Junge und Sohn). 1992, 368 pages, ISBN 3-87388-022-9.
