= Nasal vestibulitis =

Infection of the nasal cavity

Nasal vestibulitis is the diffuse dermatitis of nasal vestibule. It is often caused by Staphylococcus aureus, chronic rhinorrhea, nose picking, or viral infections.

== Causes ==
Causes include constant nose blowing, nose picking, plucking nasal hairs, nose piercings and objects being stuck within the nose. It may also develop from shingles, herpes simplex, the common cold, and a continual runny nose.

== Symptoms ==
In acute vestibulitis, the skin is red, swollen, and tender. In chronic vestibulitis, induration of vestibular skin and crusting is seen. Other symptoms include pain in the nose, swelling, discoloration, itching, bleeding, scabbing and crusting near the opening of the nose.

== Complications ==
Although the disease is easily treatable, in severe cases boils may form inside the nostrils, which can cause cellulitis at the tip of the nose. The condition becomes serious because veins at that region of the face lead to the brain, and if bacteria spreads to the brain via these veins, the person may develop a life-threatening condition called cavernous sinus thrombosis, which is an infection in the brain. Other complications include nasal septal abscess and encephalitis.

== Treatment ==
Antibiotic steroid ointment is sometimes helpful and as well as oral antibiotics. Chronic fissures can be cauterized with Silver Nitrate. If antibiotics do not work, surgical draining of the boils inside the nose may be required. With treatment, the condition lasts for three to four days.

== Prevention ==
Prevention includes handwashing, and avoiding the following behaviors: excessive nose blowing, plucking nasal hairs, popping pimples near the nostrils, and nose picking.

== See also ==
- Rhinophyma
