= Nasal fracture =

- Other names: Broken nose
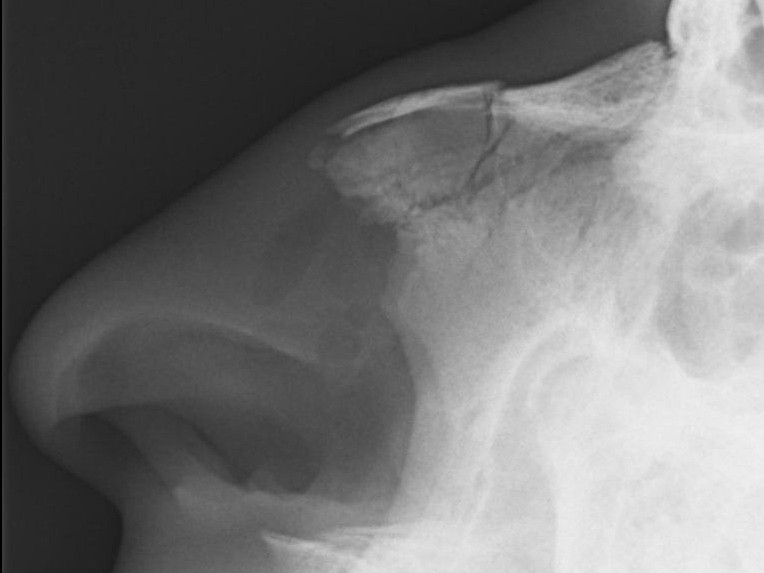
- Plain X-ray showing a nasal fracture
- Specialty: Emergency medicine, otorhinolaryngology
- Symptoms: Nose bleed, swelling, bruising
- Complications: Septal hematoma, other facial fractures, meningitis
- Usual onset: Young males
- Causes: Assault, trauma during sports, falls, motor vehicle collisions
- Diagnostic method: Typically based on symptoms, occasionally plain X rays
- Treatment: Pain medication, cold compresses, possible reduction post resolution of swelling
- Prognosis: Generally good
- Frequency: Common

A nasal fracture, commonly referred to as a broken nose, is a fracture of one of the bones of the nose. Symptoms may include bleeding, swelling, bruising, and an inability to breathe through the nose. They may be complicated by other facial fractures or a septal hematoma.

The most common causes include assault, trauma during sports, falls, and motor vehicle collisions. Diagnosis is typically based on the signs and symptoms and may occasionally be confirmed by plain X-ray.

Treatment is typically with pain medication and cold compresses. Reduction, if needed, can typically occur after the swelling has come down. Depending on the type of fracture reduction may be closed or open. Outcomes are generally good. Nasal fractures are common, comprising about 40% of facial fractures. Males in their 20s are most commonly affected.

== Signs and symptoms ==
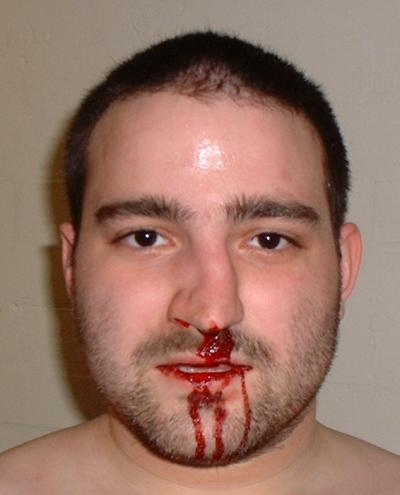
Fractured nose with epistaxis; the result of a rugby injury.

Symptoms of a broken nose include bruising, swelling, tenderness, pain, deformity, and/or bleeding of the nose and nasal region of the face. The patient may have difficulty breathing, or excessive nosebleeds (if the nasal mucosa are damaged). The patient may also have bruising around one or both eyes.

== Cause ==
Nasal fractures are caused by physical trauma to the face. Common sources of nasal fractures include sports injuries, fighting, falls, and car accidents in the younger age groups, and falls from syncope or impaired balance in the elderly.

== Diagnosis ==
Nasal fractures are usually identified visually and through physical examination. In addition, relevant questions to ask the patient include whether there is a noticeable cosmetic deformity and whether the patient has difficulty breathing through the nose after the injury. Medical imaging is generally not recommended. A priority is to distinguish simple fractures limited to the nasal bones (Type 1) from fractures that also involve other facial bones and/or the nasal septum (Types 2 and 3). In simple Type 1 fractures X-Rays supply surprisingly little information beyond clinical examination. However, diagnosis may be confirmed with X-rays or CT scans, and these are required if other facial injuries are suspected.

A fracture that runs horizontally across the septum is sometimes called a "Jarjavay fracture", and a vertical one, a "Chevallet fracture".

Although treatment of an uncomplicated fracture of nasal bones is not urgent—a referral for specific treatment in five to seven days usually suffices—an associated injury, nasal septal hematoma, occurs in about 5% of cases and does require urgent treatment and should be looked for during the assessment of nasal injuries.

== Treatment ==
Minor nasal fractures may be allowed to heal on their own provided there is not significant cosmetic deformity. Ice and pain medication may be prescribed to ease discomfort during the healing process. For nasal fractures where the nose has been deformed, manual alignment (ie, closed reduction) may be attempted, usually with good results. Manually alignment should be performed in adults within 10 days of injury (prior to the bone healing in the misaligned state). For children, bone healing occurs faster, so manual alignment should ideally be performed within 4 days of injury. Injuries involving other structures (Types 2 and 3) must be recognized and treated surgically.

== Prognosis ==
Bone stability after a fracture occurs between 3 and 5 weeks. Full bone fusion occurs between 4 and 8 weeks.
