= Franz Penzoldt =

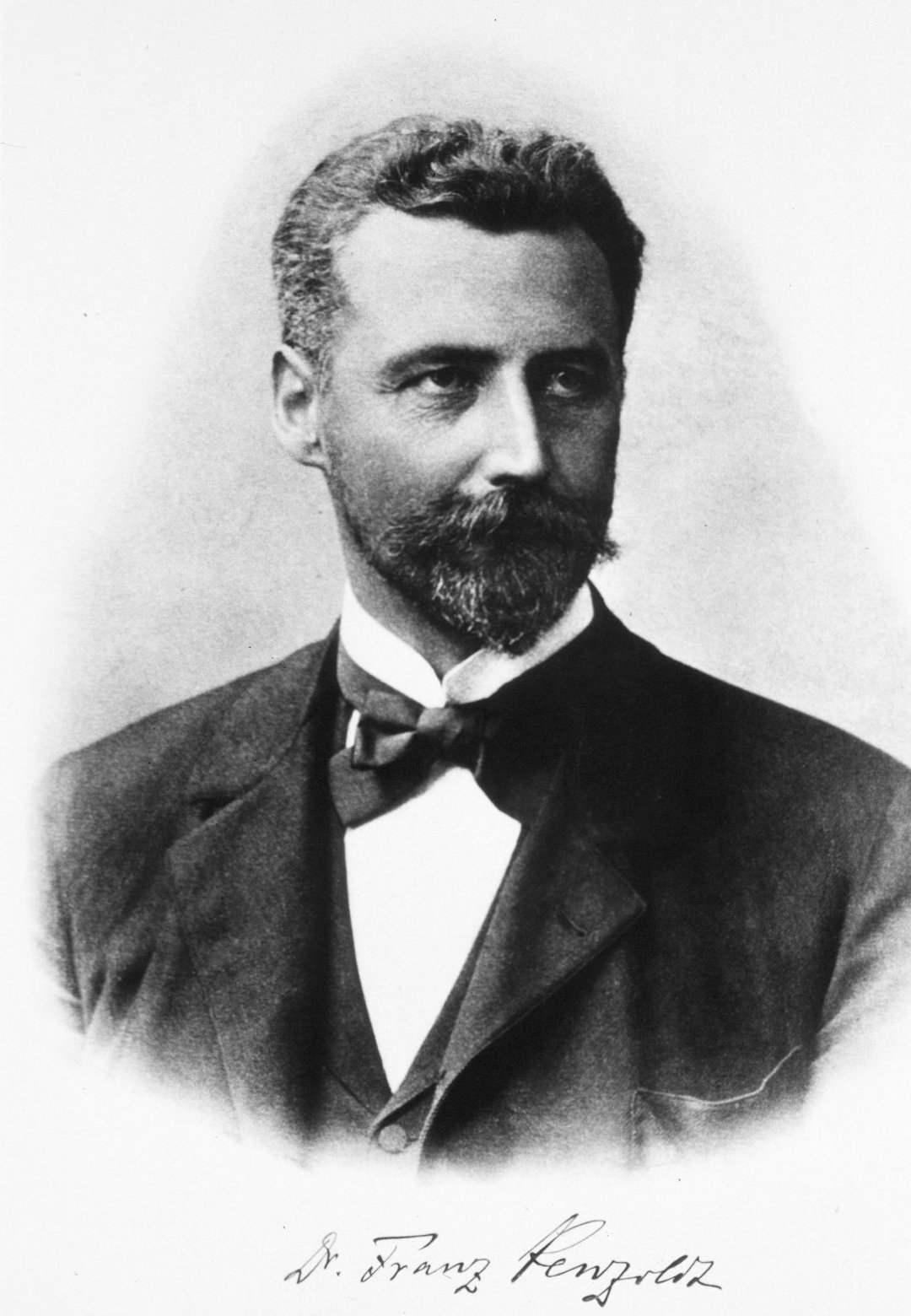

Franz Penzoldt (12 December 1849 – 19 September 1927) was a German internist and pharmacologist born in Crispendorf, Principality of Reuss-Greiz. He was the father of writer Ernst Penzoldt (1892–1955).

He studied medicine in Tübingen and Jena, where he was a student of Wilhelm Olivier Leube (1842–1922). From 1874 until his retirement in 1920, he worked at the University of Erlangen. In 1875, he obtained his habilitation at Erlangen, where he later became a professor of internal medicine and pharmacology. In 1903 he was appointed director of the medical clinic.

He was the author of the popular Lehrbuch der klinischen Arzneibehandlung für Studierende und Ärzte (Textbook of Clinical Pharmaceutical Treatment for Students and Physicians), which was published over numerous editions. With Roderich Stintzing (1854–1933), he published the Handbuch der gesamten Therapie and well as the Handbuch der speciellen Therapie innerer Krankheiten.

Today the "Franz-Penzoldt-Zentrum" at the University of Erlangen-Nuremberg is named in his honor. This facility is the center for experimental medical research at the university.

== Works ==
- Ältere und neuere Harnproben und ihr praktischer Werth : kurze Anleitung zur Harnuntersuchung in der Praxis für Ärzte und Studirende; mit 2 Holzschnitten . Fischer, Jena 3rd ed. 1890 Digital edition by the University and State Library Düsseldorf
- Lehrbuch der klinischen Arzneibehandlung : für Studierende und Ärzte . Fischer, Jena 8th ed. 1915 Digital edition by the University and State Library Düsseldorf
