= Palatine bone =

Bone of the facial skeleton

- Animation of the palatine bones

Details

Identifiers
- Latin: os palatinum
- TA98: A02.1.13.001
- TA2: 798
- FMA: 52746

In anatomy, the palatine bones (/ˈpælətaɪn/; derived from the Latin palatum) are two irregular bones of the facial skeleton in many animal species, located above the uvula in the throat. Together with the maxilla, they comprise the hard palate.

Among fishes, it is often known as the dermopalatine to distinguish it from the autopalatine.

== Structure ==
The palatine bones are situated at the back of the nasal cavity between the maxilla and the pterygoid process of the sphenoid bone.

They contribute to the walls of three cavities: the floor and lateral walls of the nasal cavity, the roof of the mouth, and the floor of the orbits. They help to form the pterygopalatine and pterygoid fossae, and the inferior orbital fissures.

Each palatine bone somewhat resembles the letter L, and consists of a horizontal plate, a perpendicular plate, and three projecting processes—the pyramidal process, which is directed backward and lateral from the junction of the two parts, and the orbital and sphenoidal processes, which surmount the vertical part, and are separated by a deep notch, the sphenopalatine notch. The two plates form the posterior part of the hard palate and the floor of the nasal cavity; anteriorly, they join with the maxillae. The two horizontal plates articulate with each other at the posterior part of the median palatine suture and more anteriorly with the maxillae at the transverse palatine suture.

The human palatine articulates with six bones: the sphenoid, ethmoid, maxilla, inferior nasal concha, vomer and opposite palatine.

There are two important foramina in the palatine bones that transmit nerves and blood vessels to this region: the greater and lesser palatine. The larger greater palatine foramen is located in the posterolateral region of each of the palatine bones, usually at the apex of the maxillary third molar. The greater palatine foramen transmits the greater palatine nerve and blood vessels. A smaller opening nearby, the lesser palatine foramen, transmits the lesser palatine nerve and blood vessels to the soft palate and tonsils. Both foramina are openings of the pterygopalatine canal that carries the descending palatine nerves and blood vessels from the pterygopalatine fossa to the palate.

== Function ==
The sphenopalatine foramen is the opening between the sphenoid bone and orbital processes of the palatine bone; it opens into the nasal cavity and gives passage to branches from the pterygopalatine ganglion and the sphenopalatine artery from the maxillary artery.

== Other animals ==
In bony fish, the palatine bone consists of the perpendicular plate only, lying on the inner edge of the maxilla. It is often closely appressed (even fused) to the autopalatine; for this reason, it is often called the dermopalatine. As many as four dermopalatines are present among paleoniscids; two are present in bowfins, and one in teleosts. The ectopterygoid of coelacanths may represent a dermopalatine, rather than a true ectopterygoid.

The lower surface of the bone may bear several teeth, forming a second row behind those of the maxilla; in many cases, these are actually larger than the maxillary teeth. Although a similar pattern was present in primitive tetrapods, the palatine bone is reduced in most living amphibians, forming, in frogs and salamanders, only a narrow bar between the vomer and maxilla.

Early fossil reptiles retained the arrangement seen in more primitive vertebrates, but in mammals, the lower surface of the palatine became folded over during evolution, forming the horizontal plate, and meeting in the midline of the mouth. This forms the rear of the hard palate, separating the oral and nasal cavities, and making it easier to breathe while eating. A parallel development has occurred to varying degrees in many living reptiles, reaching its greatest extent in crocodilians. In birds, the palatine bones remain separate, long the sides of the rear part of the upper jaw, and typically have a mobile articulation with the cranium.

There are numerous variations amongst mammals, amphibians and other species. For example, the palatine bone in many amphibians such as the rough-skinned newt manifests as a distinct V-shaped structure. In the case of cat species, the horizontal and a vertical elements join at a 45-degree angle.

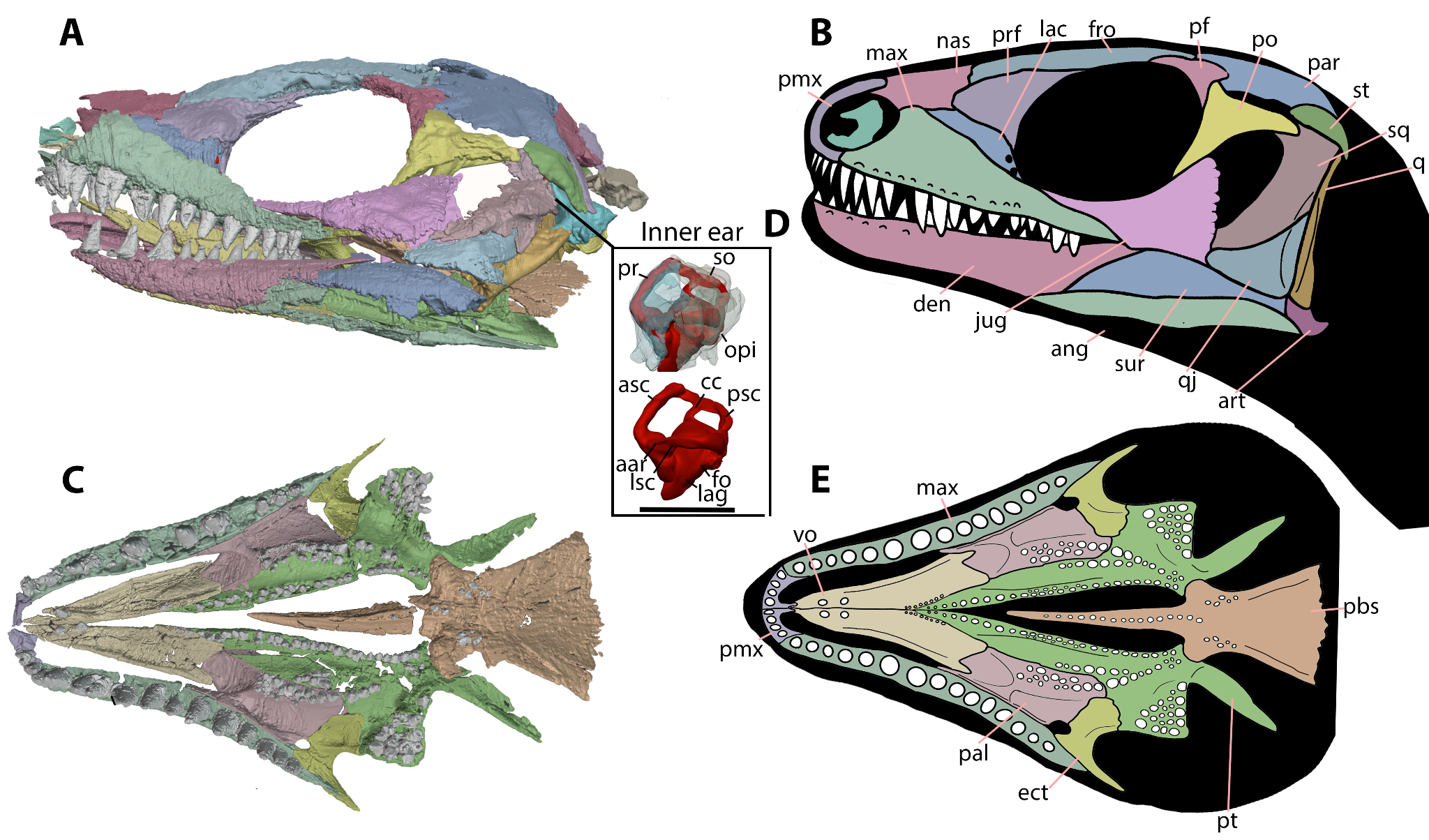
Skull of the primitive reptile Milleretta (Millerettidae) with palatine bone with palatal teeth labeled "pal" in light red, bottom left

Ancestrally in tetrapods, the palatine is one of several bones of the roof of the mouth which bear teeth (palatal dentition), though in the cynodont ancestors of living mammals they were lost. Teeth on the palatine bone are retained by living lepidosaurs (including lizards, snakes and the tuatara).

=== Neopalatine ===
In the early 1990s, a morphological phylogenetic analysis by Linda Trueb and Richard Cloutier suggested that the palatine was ancestrally long among lissamphibians, and that the element called the "palatine" in neobatrachian frogs was actually a neomorph, which Trueb named the neopalatine. A 2017 paper pointed out that the palatine is present in Triadobatrachus as well as in some non-neobatrachian frogs, suggesting that the "neopalatine" is a palatine after all. Nevertheless, the term "neopalatine" has continued to see use in the herpetological literature.

== Additional images ==
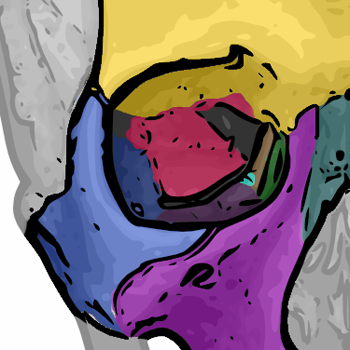
The seven bones which articulate to form the orbit

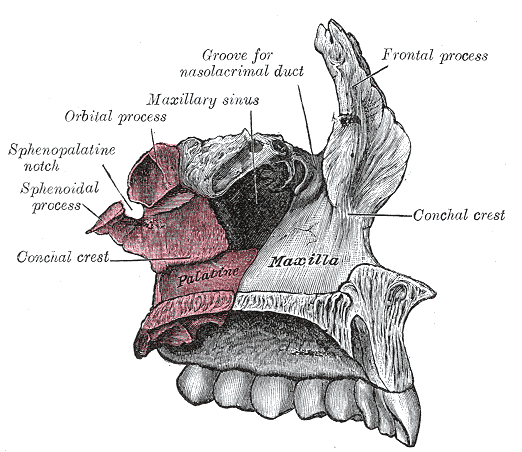
Articulation of left palatine bone with maxilla

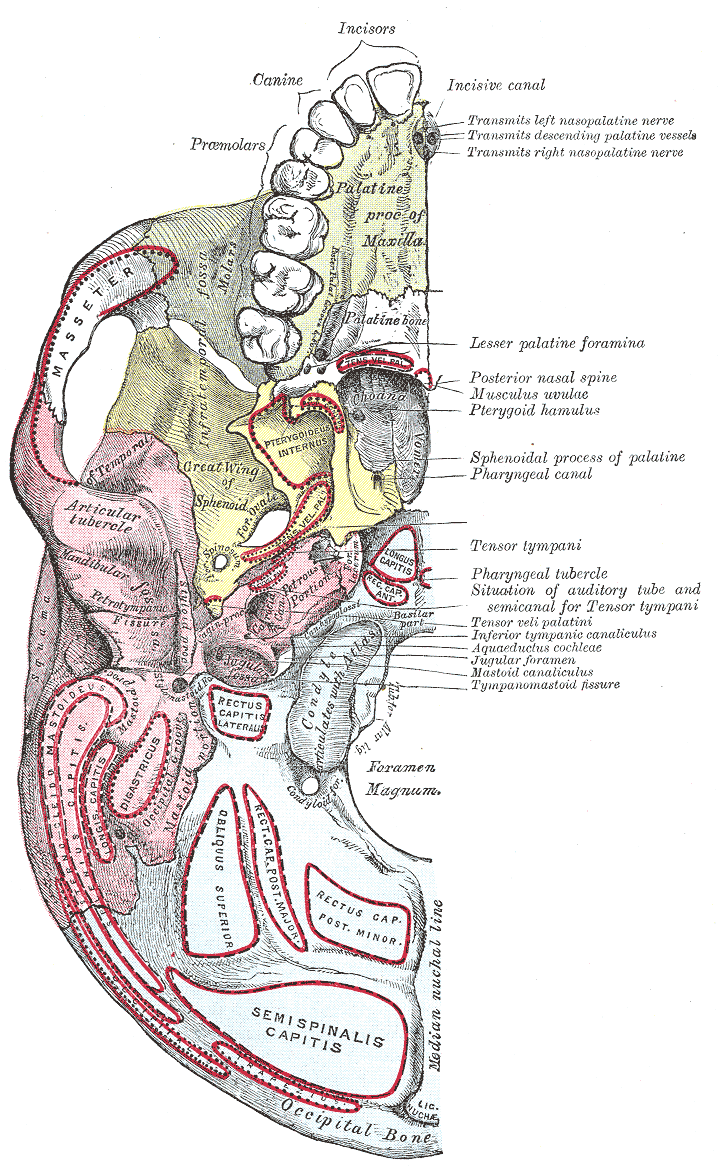
Base of skull. Inferior surface.

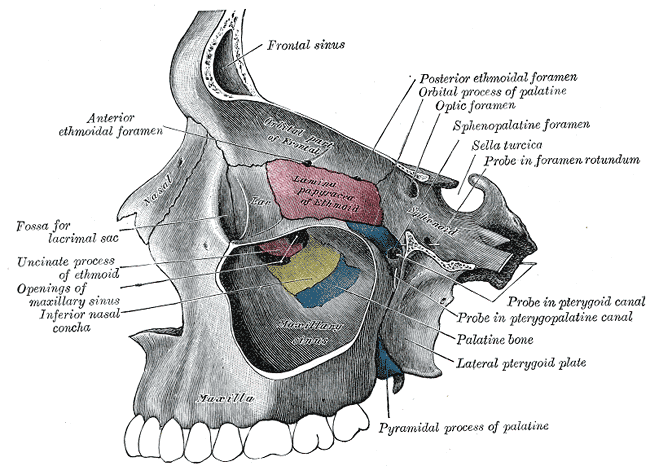
Medial wall of left orbit

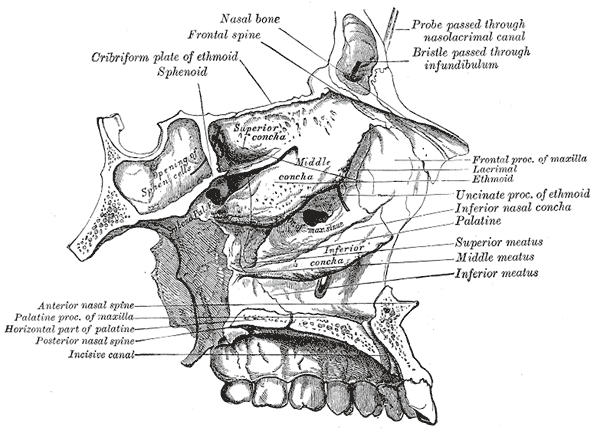
Roof, floor, and lateral wall of left nasal cavity

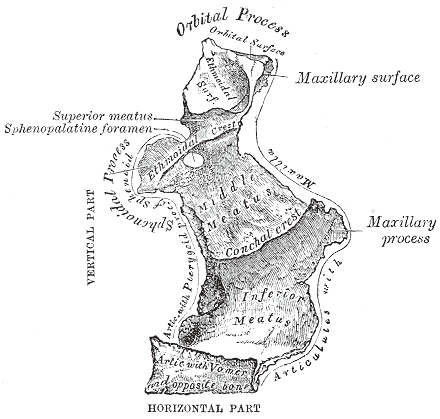
Medial aspect of left palatine bone

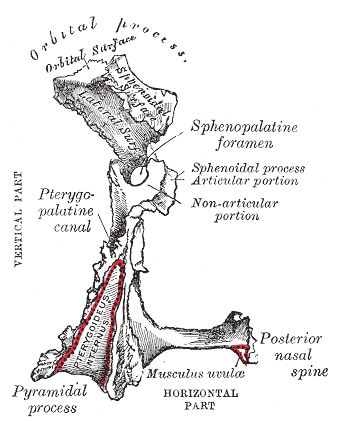
Posterior aspect of left palatine bone

== See also ==
  - Nasopalatine nerve
  - Superior nasal nerve
- Bone terminology
- Terms for anatomical location
