= Kiesselbach's plexus =

Vascular network in the nose

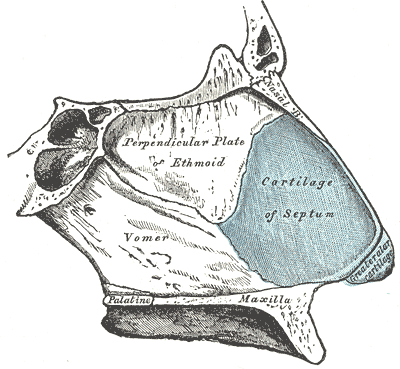
- The bones and cartilage of the nasal septum, viewed from right side. Kiesselbach's plexus (not labelled) is in the anterior inferior part of the nasal septum known as Little's area.

Details
- Location: Little's area of nose
- From: Anterior ethmoidal artery, sphenopalatine artery, greater palatine artery, septal branch of superior labial artery, posterior ethmoidal artery
- Supplies: Nasal septum

Kiesselbach's plexus is an anastomotic arterial network (plexus) of four or five arteries in the nose supplying the nasal septum. It lies in the anterior inferior part of the septum known as Little's area, Kiesselbach's area, or Kiesselbach's triangle. It is a common site for anterior nosebleeds.

== Structure ==
Kiesselbach's plexus is an anastomosis of four or five arteries:

- the anterior ethmoidal artery, a branch of the ophthalmic artery, a branch of the internal carotid artery.
- the sphenopalatine artery, a terminal branch of the maxillary artery, a branch of the external carotid artery
- the greater palatine artery, a branch of the maxillary artery, a branch of the external carotid artery.
- a septal branch of the superior labial artery, a branch of the facial artery, a branch of the external carotid artery.
- a posterior ethmoidal artery, a branch of the ophthalmic artery, a branch of the internal carotid artery. There is contention as whether this is truly part of Kiesselbach's plexus. Most sources quote that it is not part of the plexus, but rather one of the blood supplies for the nasal septum itself.

It runs vertically downwards just behind the columella, and crosses the floor of the nose. It joins the venous plexus on the lateral nasal wall.

== Function ==
Kiesselbach's plexus supplies blood to the nasal septum.

== Clinical significance ==
Ninety percent of nosebleeds (epistaxis) occur in Kiesselbach's plexus, whereas five to ten percent originate from Woodruff's plexus. It is exposed to the drying effect of inhaled air. It can also be damaged by trauma from a finger nail (nose picking), as it is fragile. It is the usual site for nosebleeds in children and young adults. A physician may use a nasal speculum to see that an anterior nosebleed comes from Kiesselbach's plexus.

== History ==
James Lawrence Little (1836–1885), an American surgeon, first described the area in detail in 1879. Little described the area as being "about half an inch ... from the lower edge of the middle of the column [septum]".

Kiesselbach's plexus is named after Wilhelm Kiesselbach (1839–1902), a German otolaryngologist who published a paper on the area in 1884. The area may be called Little's area, Kiesselbach's area, or Kiesselbach's triangle.

== Other ==
A common mnemonic used to remember the arteries of the Kiesselbach's plexus is "Kiesselbach drives his Lexus with his LEGS" (superior Labial artery, anterior and posterior Ethmoid artery, Greater palatine artery, Sphenopalatine artery).

== See also ==
- Anatomical terms of location
