= Ferdinand Gumprecht =

German internist

Ferdinand Adolph Gumprecht (March 18, 1864 – 1947) was a German internist born in Berlin.

He studied medicine at the Universities of Heidelberg, Berlin, Göttingen and Jena, earning his doctorate at the latter institution in 1889. In 1890 he became an assistant at the Krankenhaus Friedrichshain in Berlin, followed by work at the pathological institute and at the medical clinic at the University of Jena, where he served as an assistant to Paul Fürbringer (1849-1930) and Roderich Stintzing (1854-1933).

In 1895 he obtained his habilitation for internal medicine at Jena, receiving the title of professor in 1899. From 1900 onward, he served as medical counselor and medizinischer referent to the state ministry in Weimar.

== Associated eponyms ==
- "Gumprecht's shadows": Synonym for smudge cells.
- "Klein-Gumprecht shadow nuclei": Shadow nuclei observed in the peripheral blood smears of patients with leukemia. Named with Hungarian histologist Eduard Emmanuel Klein (1844-1925).

== Selected writings ==
- Pathogenese des Tetanus (in: Pfluger's Archive der gesamten Physiologie, 1894)
- Leukozytenzerfall im Blute bei Leukämie und bei schweren Anämien. Deutsches Archiv für klinische Medizin, Leipzig, 1896, 57: 523-548. (Gumprecht's treatise on leukocyte degradation associated with leukemia).
- Die Technik der speziellen Therapie für Ärzte und Studierende. Jena, 1898; 4th edition, 1907. translated into French, Italian, Russian, and Spanish.
- Epidemiologie und Immunität., in Theodor Weyl (1851-1913): "Handbuch der Hygiene". second edition. Volume 8. Leipzig, 1921.
