= Perpendicular plate of palatine bone =

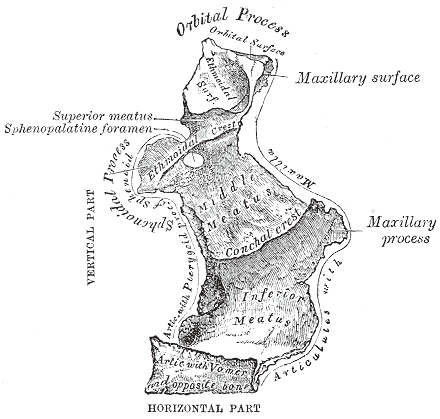
- Left palatine bone. Nasal aspect. Enlarged. (Vertical plate labeled at center left.)

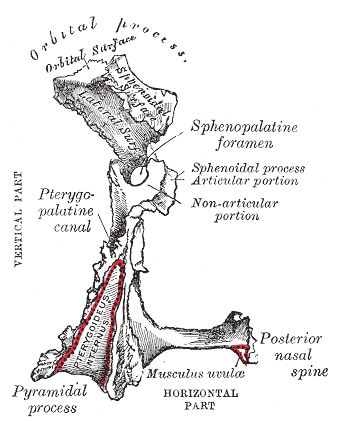
- Left palatine bone. Posterior aspect. Enlarged. (Vertical plate labeled at center left.)

Details

Identifiers
- Latin: lamina perpendicularis ossis palatini, pars perpendicularis
- TA98: A02.1.13.002
- TA2: 799
- FMA: 52899

The perpendicular plate of palatine bone is the vertical part of the palatine bone, and is thin, of an oblong form, and presents two surfaces and four borders.

== Surfaces ==
The nasal surface exhibits at its lower part a broad, shallow depression, which forms part of the inferior meatus of the nose. Immediately above this is a well-marked horizontal ridge, the conchal crest, for articulation with the inferior nasal concha; still higher is a second broad, shallow depression, which forms part of the middle meatus, and is limited above by a horizontal crest less prominent than the inferior, the ethmoidal crest, for articulation with the middle nasal concha. Above the ethmoidal crest is a narrow, horizontal groove, which forms part of the superior meatus.

The maxillary surface is rough and irregular throughout the greater part of its extent, for articulation with the nasal surface of the maxilla; its upper and back part is smooth where it enters into the formation of the pterygopalatine fossa; it is also smooth in front, where it forms the posterior part of the medial wall of the maxillary sinus. On the posterior part of this surface is a deep vertical groove, converted into the pterygopalatine canal, by articulation with the maxilla; this canal transmits the descending palatine vessels, and the anterior palatine nerve.

== Borders ==
The anterior border is thin and irregular; opposite the conchal crest is a pointed, projecting lamina, the maxillary process, which is directed forward, and closes in the lower and back part of the opening of the maxillary sinus.

The posterior border presents a deep groove, the edges of which are serrated for articulation with the medial pterygoid plate of the sphenoid. This border is continuous above with the sphenoidal process; below it expands into the pyramidal process.

The superior border supports the orbital process in front and the sphenoidal process behind. These processes are separated by the sphenopalatine notch, which is converted into the sphenopalatine foramen by the under surface of the body of the sphenoid. In the articulated skull this foramen leads from the pterygopalatine fossa into the posterior part of the superior meatus of the nose, and transmits the sphenopalatine vessels and the superior nasal and nasopalatine nerves.

The inferior border is fused with the lateral edge of the horizontal part, and immediately in front of the pyramidal process is grooved by the lower end of the pterygopalatine canal.
