= Nosebleed =

Bleeding from the nose

- Other names: Epistaxis, blood nose, nasal hemorrhage
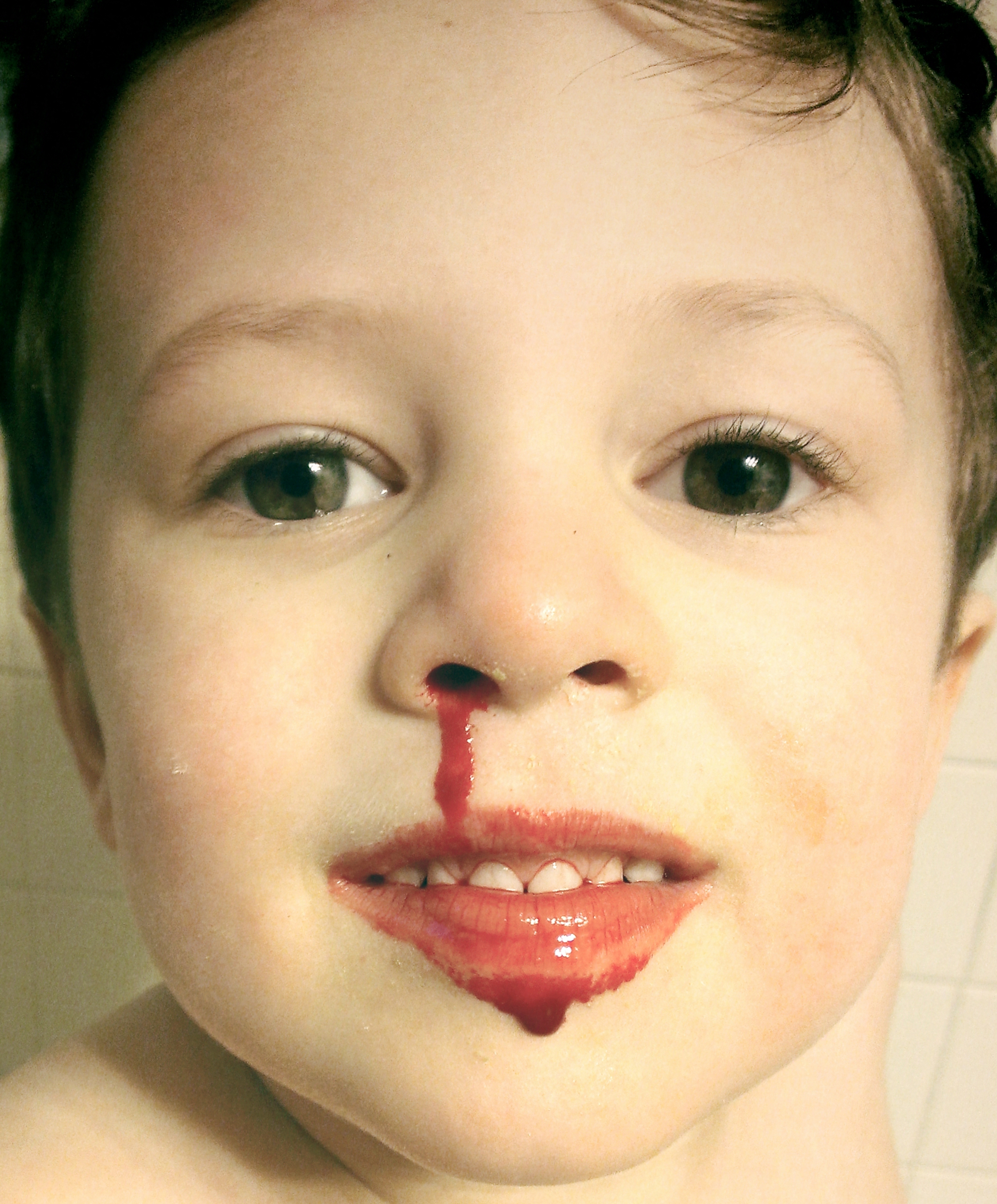
- A three-year-old child with a minor nosebleed from falling and hitting his face on the floor
- Pronunciation: Epistaxis /ˌɛpɪˈstæksɪs/ EP-ih-STAK-sis
- Specialty: Otorhinolaryngology, emergency medicine
- Symptoms: Bleeding from the nose
- Usual onset: Less than 10 and over 50 years old
- Risk factors: Trauma, excessive nose picking, forceful nose blowing, certain infections, blood thinners, high blood pressure, alcoholism, seasonal allergies, dry / cold weather, environmental irritants
- Diagnostic method: Direct observation
- Differential diagnosis: Bleeding from the lungs, esophageal varices, vomiting blood
- Prevention: Petroleum jelly in the nose
- Treatment: Pressure over the lower half of the nose, nasal packing, endoscopy
- Medication: Tranexamic acid
- Frequency: 60% at least once in a lifetime
- Deaths: Rare

A nosebleed, also known medically as epistaxis, is bleeding from the nasal cavity caused by rupture of small blood vessels in the nasal mucosa. Most cases are minor and stop spontaneously with simple first-aid or medical care. In some cases, blood may flow down into the stomach, and cause nausea and vomiting. In more severe cases, blood may come out of both nostrils. In rare cases, bleeding may be so significant that low blood pressure occurs. Blood may also be forced to flow up and through the nasolacrimal duct and out of the eye, producing bloody tears.

Risk factors include trauma, especially from nosepicking, blood thinners, high blood pressure, alcoholism, seasonal allergies, dry weather, and inhaled corticosteroids. There are two types: anterior, which is more common; and posterior, which is less common, but more serious. Anterior nosebleeds generally occur from Kiesselbach's plexus while posterior bleeds generally occur from the sphenopalatine artery or Woodruff's plexus. The diagnosis is by direct observation.

Although nosebleeds can appear dramatic, they are rarely life-threatening. Most resolve without medical intervention, but posterior or severe bleeds may require urgent care. Prevention may include the use of petroleum jelly in the nose. Initially, treatment is generally the application of pressure for at least thirty minutes over the lower half of the nose. If this is not sufficient, nasal packing may be used. Tranexamic acid may also be helpful. If bleeding episodes continue, endoscopy is recommended.

About 60% of people have a nosebleed at some point in their life. About 10% of nosebleeds are serious. Approximately 6% of patients will seek medical attention for epistaxis. Nosebleeds are rarely fatal, accounting for only 4 of the 2.4 million deaths in the U.S. in 1999. Nosebleeds most commonly affect those younger than 10 and older than 50.

== Cause ==
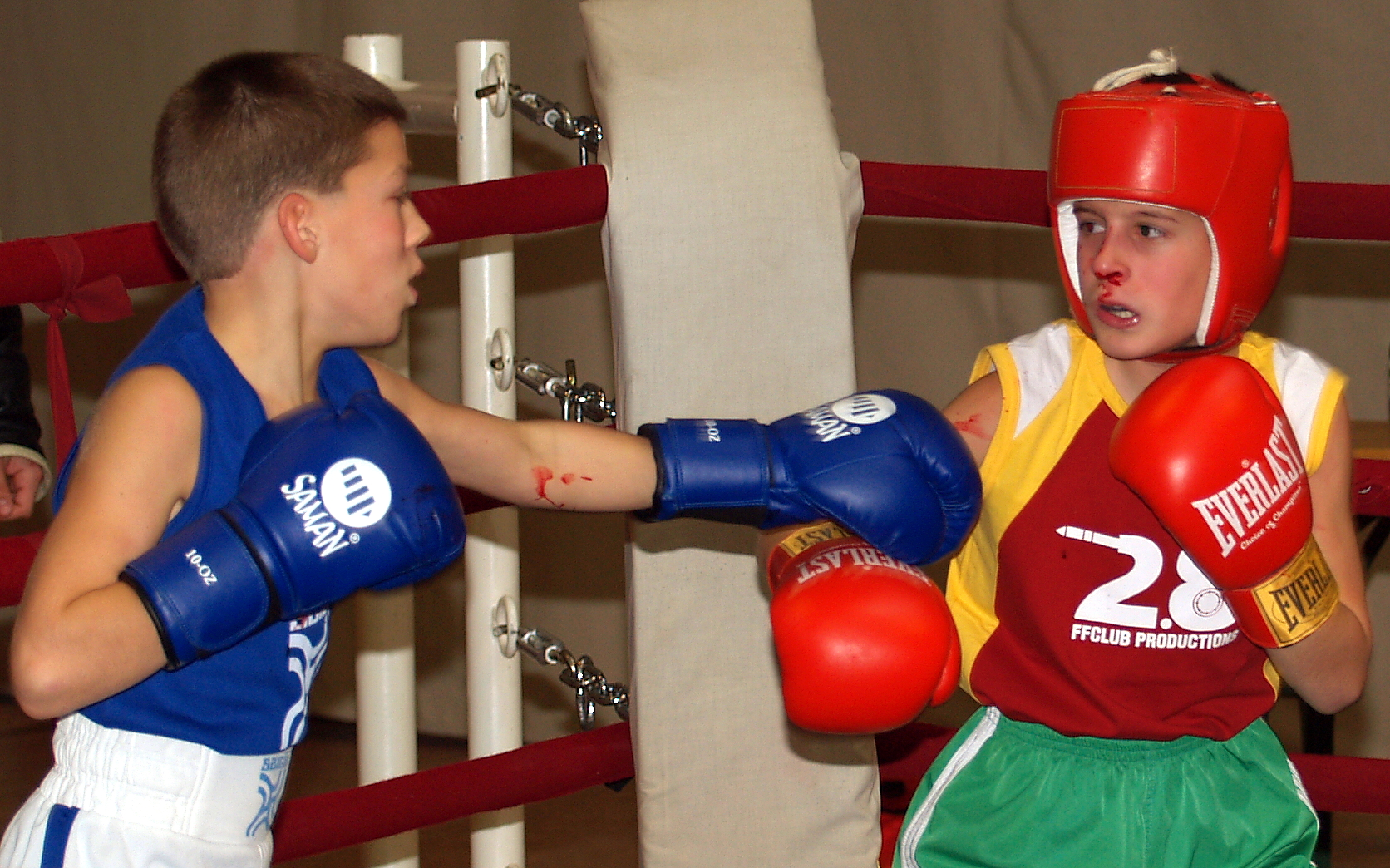
Two children boxing, the one on the right having a nosebleed due to a punch to the face, in Vecsés, Hungary

Nosebleeds can occur due to a variety of reasons. Some of the most common causes include trauma from nose picking, blunt trauma (such as a motor vehicle accident), or insertion of a foreign object (more likely in children). Low relative humidity (such as in centrally heated buildings), respiratory tract infections, chronic sinusitis, rhinitis or environmental irritants can cause inflammation and thinning of the tissue in the nose, leading to a greater likelihood of bleeding from the nose.

Most causes of nose bleeding are self-limiting and do not require medical attention. However, if nosebleeds are recurrent or do not respond to home therapies, an underlying cause may need to be investigated. Some rarer causes are listed below:

Coagulopathy

- Thrombocytopenia (thrombotic thrombocytopenic purpura, idiopathic thrombocytopenic purpura)
- Von Willebrand's disease
- Hemophilia
- Leukemia
- HIV
- Chronic liver disease—cirrhosis causes deficiency of factor II, VII, IX,& X

Dietary

- Sulfur dioxide (sulphur dioxide) E220 (as a food preservative used particularly in wines and dried fruits)
- Sulphites as food preservatives
- Salicylates naturally occurring in some fruits and vegetables

Inflammatory

- Granulomatosis with polyangiitis
- Systemic lupus erythematosus

Medications/Drugs

- Anticoagulation (warfarin, heparin, aspirin, etc.)
- Insufflated drugs (particularly cocaine)
- Nasal sprays (particularly prolonged or improper use of nasal steroids)

Neoplastic

- Squamous cell carcinoma
- Adenoid cystic carcinoma
- Melanoma
- Nasopharyngeal carcinoma
- Nasopharyngeal angiofibroma
- Nosebleeds can be a sign of cancer in the sinus area, which is rare, or tumors starting at the base of the brain, such as meningioma. Due to the sensitive location, nosebleeds caused by tumors are typically associated with other symptoms, such as hearing or vision problems.

Traumatic

- Anatomical deformities (e.g. septal spurs)
- Blunt trauma (usually a sharp blow to the face such as a punch, sometimes accompanying a nasal fracture)
- Foreign bodies (such as fingers during nose-picking)
- Digital trauma (nose picking)
- Middle ear barotrauma (such as from descent in aircraft or ascent in scuba diving)
- Nasal bone fracture
- Septal fracture/perforation
- Intranasal tumors (e.g. Nasopharyngeal carcinoma or nasopharyngeal angiofibroma)
- Nasal cannula O_{2} (tending to dry the olfactory mucosa)
- Nasal sprays (particularly prolonged or improper use of nasal steroids)
- Surgery (e.g. septoplasty and functional endoscopic sinus surgery)
- Leech infestation
- Nasal bleeds may be due to fracture of facial bones, namely maxilla and zygoma.

Vascular

- Hereditary hemorrhagic telangiectasia (Osler–Weber–Rendu disease)
- Angioma
- Aneurysm of the carotid artery

== Pathophysiology ==
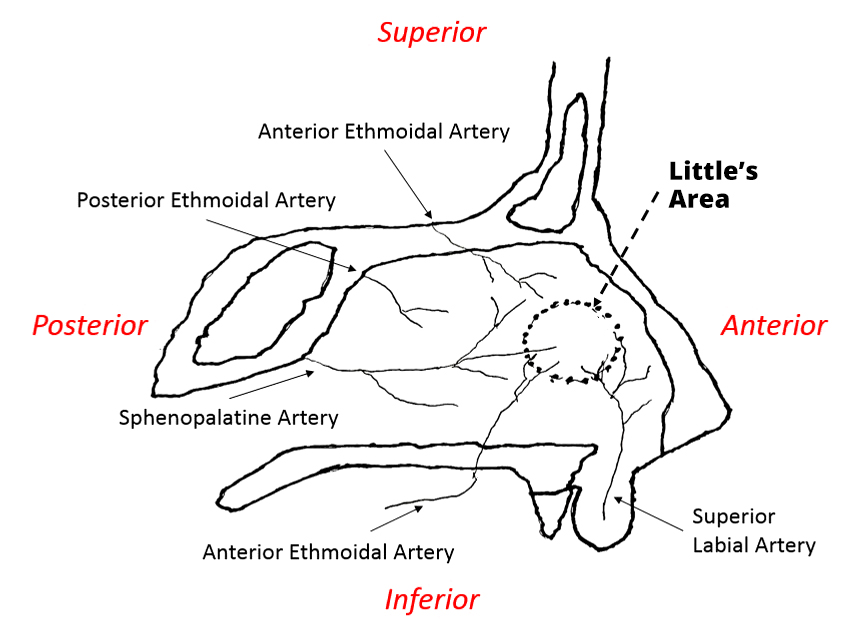
The arteries that supply Kiesselbach's plexus (responsible for anterior nosebleeds)

The nasal mucosa contains a rich blood supply that can be easily ruptured and cause bleeding. Rupture may be spontaneous or initiated by trauma. Anatomical deformities (e.g., septal spurs) can disrupt normal nasal airflow, leading to mucosal drying and crusting that predisposes to anterior epistaxis. Epidemiologic studies have also shown an association between nasal septal deviation and recurrent epistaxis in adults. Nosebleeds are reported in up to 60% of the population with peak incidences in those under the age of ten and over the age of 50 and appear to occur in males more than females. An increase in blood pressure (e.g. due to general hypertension) tends to increase the duration of spontaneous epistaxis. Anticoagulant medication and disorders of blood clotting can promote and prolong bleeding. Spontaneous epistaxis is more common in the elderly as the nasal mucosa (lining) becomes dry and thin and blood pressure tends to be higher. The elderly are also more prone to prolonged nosebleeds as their blood vessels are less able to constrict and control the bleeding.

The vast majority of nosebleeds occur in the front anterior (front) part of the nose from the nasal septum. This area is richly endowed with blood vessels (Kiesselbach's plexus). This region is also known as Little's area. Bleeding further back in the nose is known as a posterior bleed and is usually due to bleeding from Woodruff's plexus, a venous plexus situated in the posterior part of inferior meatus. Posterior bleeds are often prolonged and difficult to control. They can be associated with bleeding from both nostrils and with a greater flow of blood into the mouth.

Sometimes blood flowing from other sources of bleeding passes through the nasal cavity and exits the nostrils. It is thus blood coming from the nose but is not a true nosebleed, that is, not truly originating from the nasal cavity. Such bleeding is called "pseudoepistaxis" (pseudo + epistaxis). Examples include blood coughed up through the airway and ending up in the nasal cavity, then dripping out.

== Prevention ==
People with uncomplicated nosebleeds can use conservative methods to prevent future nosebleeds such as sleeping in a humidified environment or applying petroleum jelly to the nasal nares.

Individuals who have frequent nosebleeds, especially children, are encouraged to use over-the-counter nasal saline sprays and avoid vigorous nose-blowing as preventative measures.

== Treatment ==
Most anterior nosebleeds can be stopped by applying direct pressure, which helps by promoting blood clots. Those who have a nosebleed should apply pressure to the soft anterior part of the nose (by pinching the nasal ala, not the bony nasal bridge) for at least five minutes and up to 30 minutes. Pressure should be firm and tilting the head forward helps decrease the chance of nausea and airway obstruction due to blood dripping into the airway. When attempting to stop a nosebleed at home, the head should not be tilted back. Swallowing excess blood can irritate the stomach and cause vomiting. Vasoconstrictive medications such as oxymetazoline (Afrin) or phenylephrine are widely available over the counter for treatment of allergic rhinitis and may also be used to control benign cases of epistaxis. For example, a few sprays of oxymetazoline may be applied into the bleeding side(s) of the nose followed by application of direct pressure. Those with nosebleeds that last longer than 30 minutes (despite use of direct pressure and vasoconstrictive medications such as oxymetazoline) should seek medical attention. Patients with frequent nosebleeds should also consider seeking medical attention to rule out other more serious causes (eg, nasal mass or tumor).

Clip used to stop a nosebleed
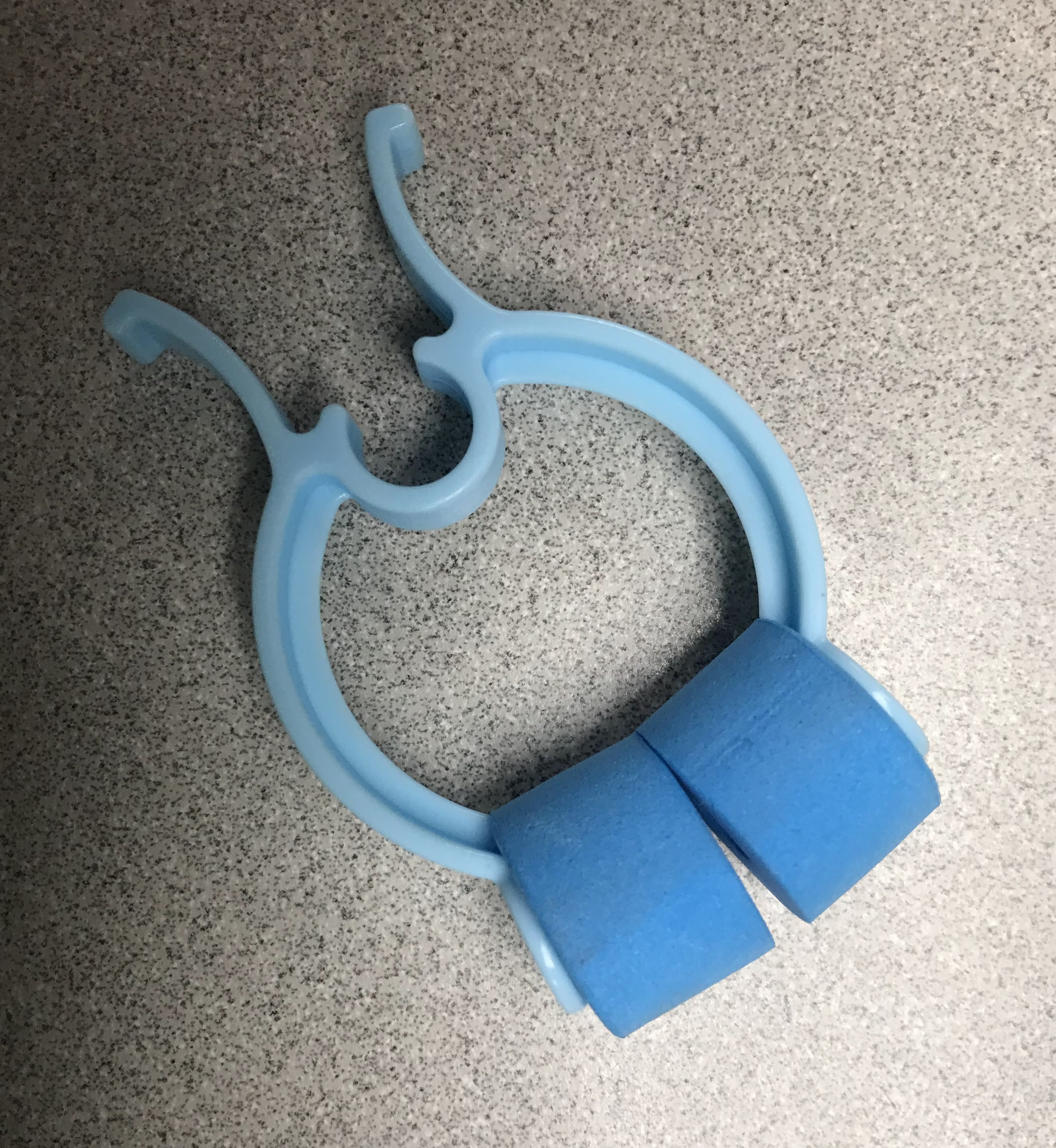

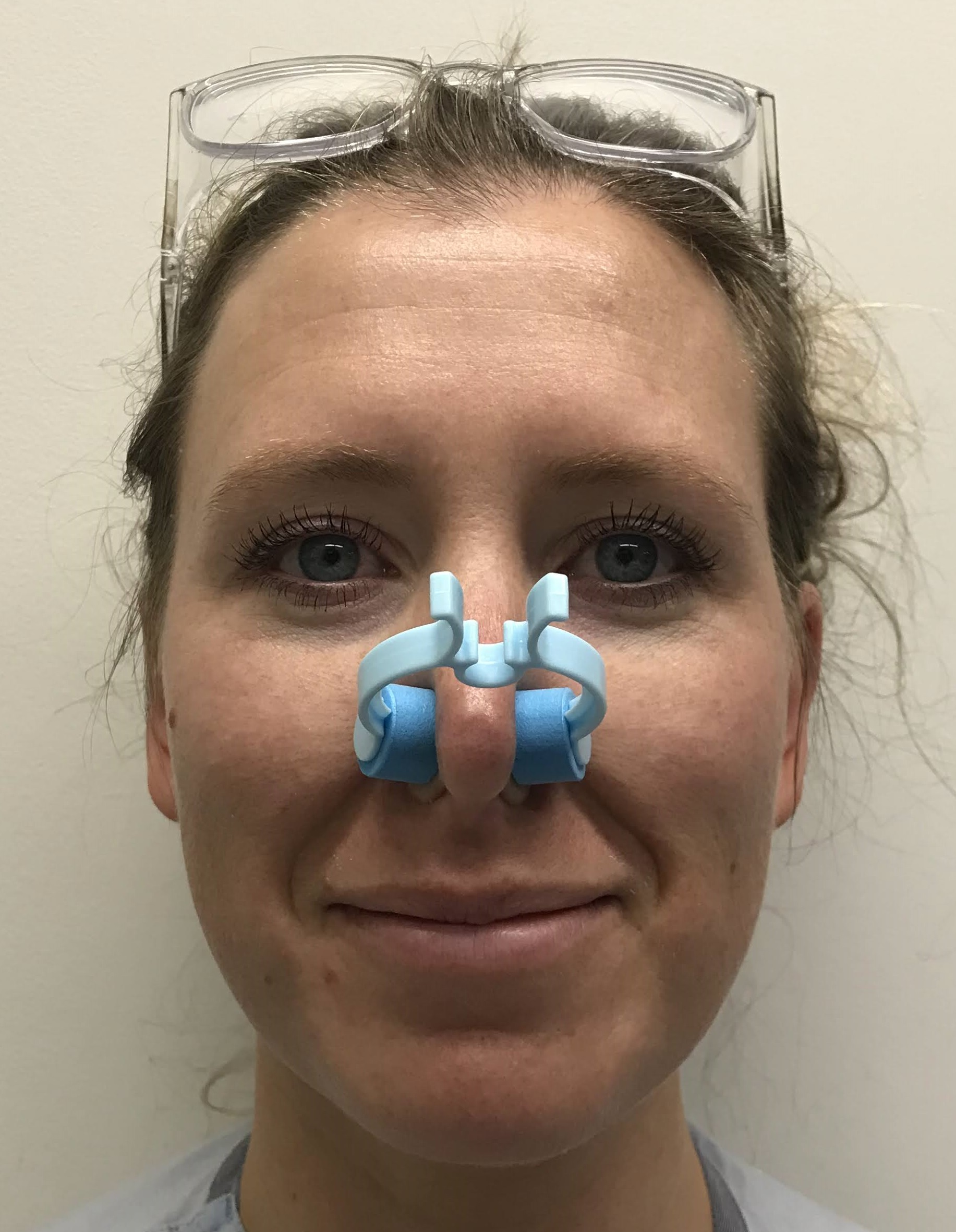

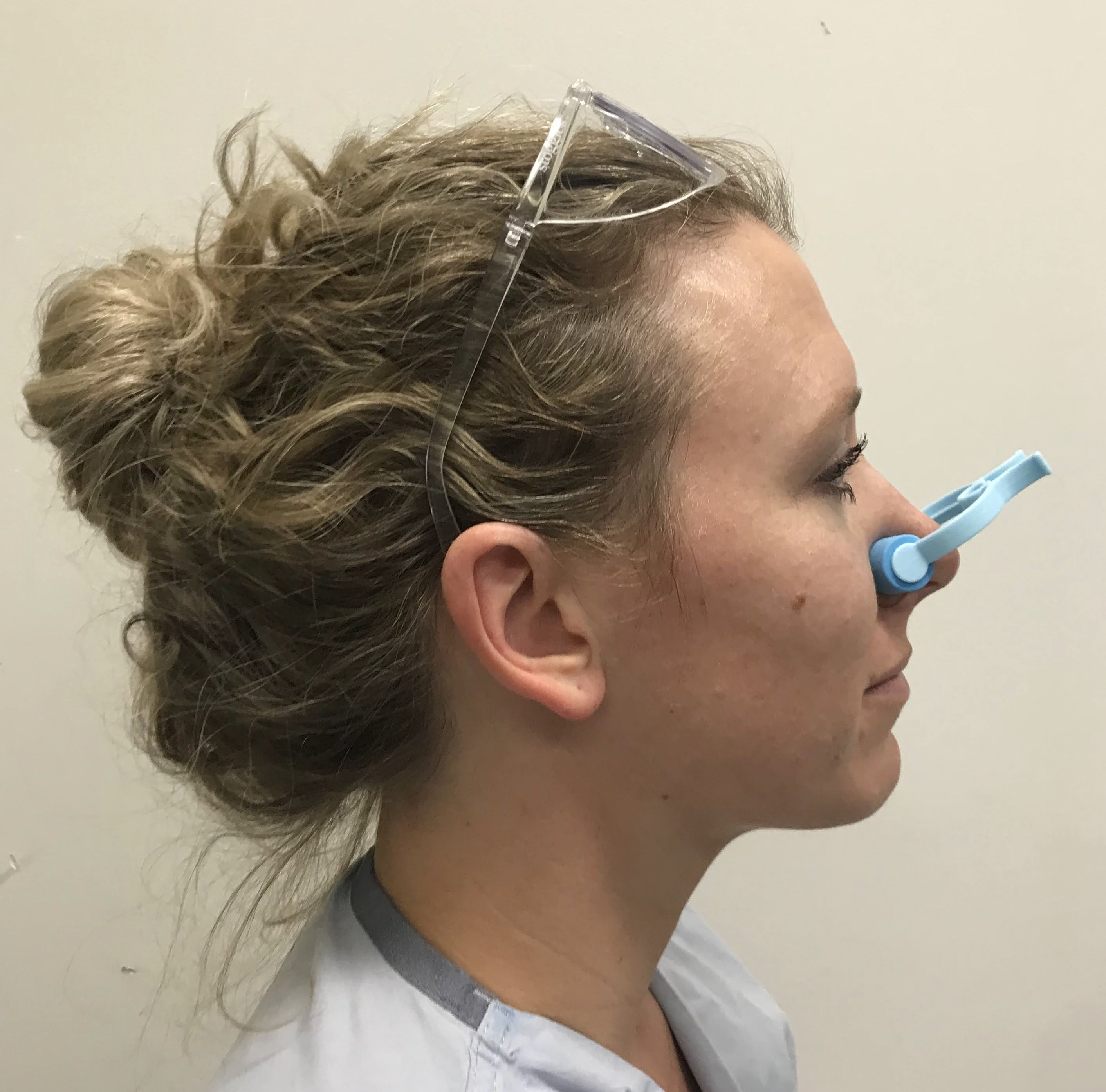

=== Chemical cauterization ===
This method involves applying a chemical such as silver nitrate to the nasal mucosa, which burns and seals off the bleeding. Eventually the nasal tissue to which the chemical is applied will undergo necrosis. This form of treatment is best for mild bleeds, especially in children, that are clearly visible. A topical anesthetic (such as lidocaine) is usually applied prior to cauterization. Silver nitrate can cause blackening of the skin due to silver sulfide deposit, though this will fade with time. Once the silver nitrate is deposited, saline may be used to neutralize any excess silver nitrate via formation of silver chloride precipitate.

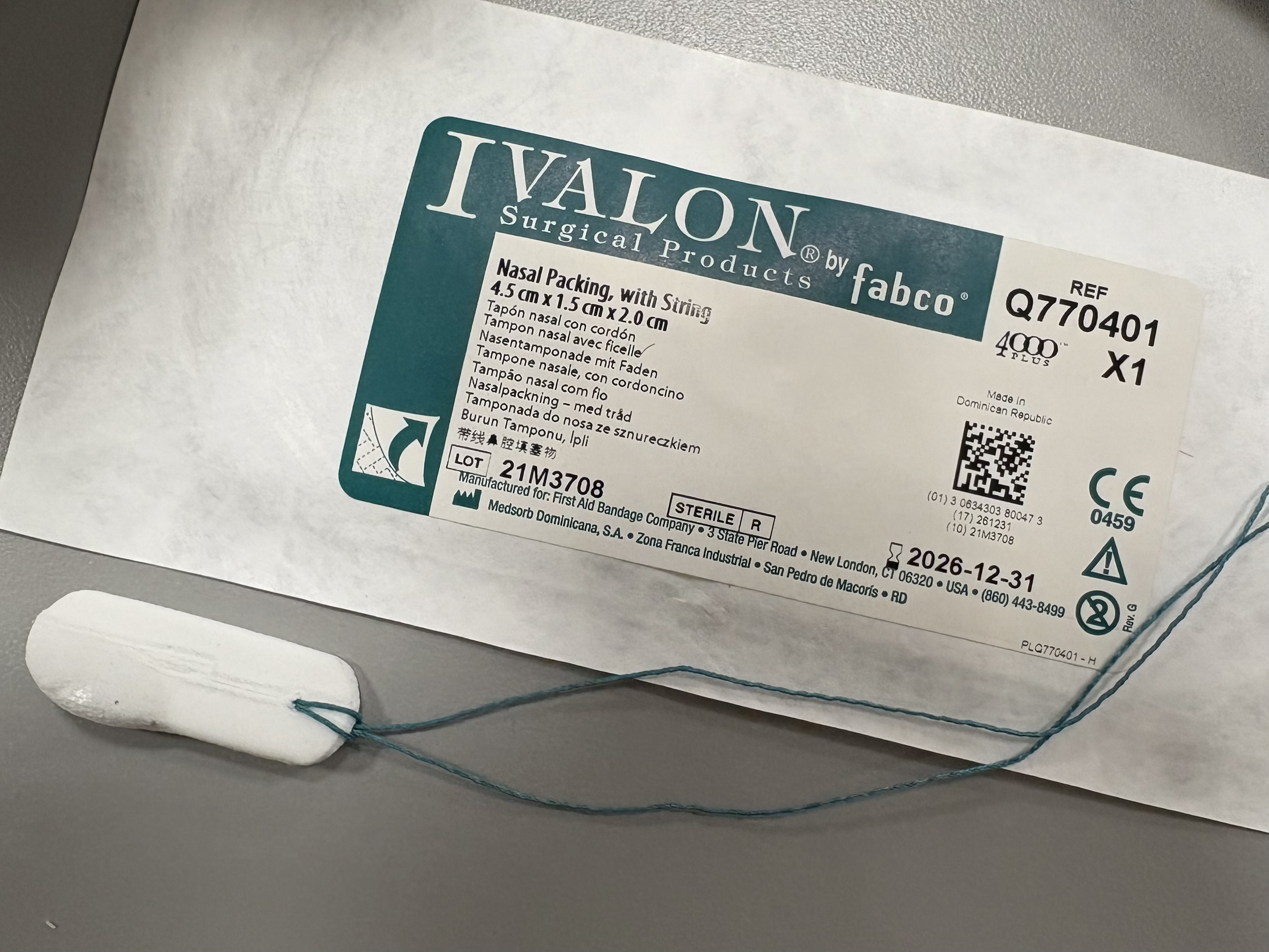
Sterile PVA sponge used to stop nose bleeds. Expands with fluid and is very absorbent.

=== Nasal packing ===
If pressure and chemical cauterization cannot stop bleeding, nasal packing is the mainstay of treatment. Nasal packing is typically categorized into anterior nasal packing and posterior nasal packing. Nasal packing may also be categorized into dissolvable and non-dissolvable types.

Dissolvable nasal packing materials stop bleeding through use of thrombotic agents that promote blood clots, such as surgicel and gelfoam. The thrombogenic foams and gels do not require removal and dissolve after a few days. Typically, dissolvable nasal packing is first attempted. If the bleeding persists, non-dissolvable nasal packing is the next option.

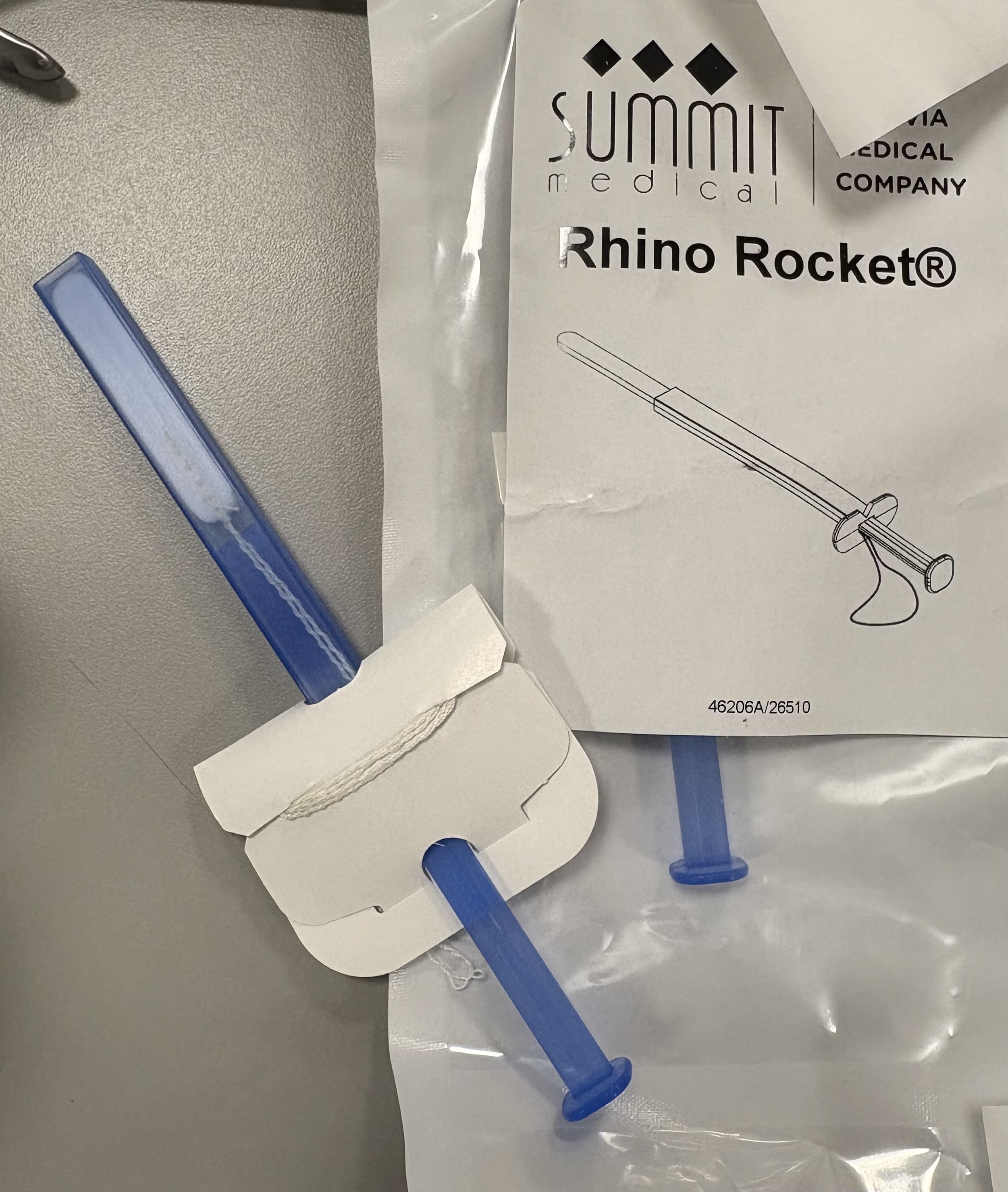
Rhino Rocket: PVA Expandacell foam that swells with fluid; the applicator aids in placement.

Traditionally, nasal packing was accomplished by packing gauze into the nose, thereby placing pressure on the vessels in the nose and stopping the bleeding. Traditional gauze packing has been replaced with other non-dissolvable nasal packing products such as Merocel and the Rapid Rhino. The Merocel nasal tampon is similar to gauze packing except it is a synthetic foam polymer (made of polyvinyl alcohol and expands in the nose after application of water) that provides a less hospitable medium for bacteria. The Rapid Rhino stops nosebleeds using a balloon catheter, made of carboxymethylcellulose, which has a cuff that is inflated by air to stop bleeding through extra pressure in the nasal cavity. Systematic review articles have demonstrated that the efficacy in stopping nosebleeds is similar between the Rapid Rhino and Merocel packs. However, the Rapid Rhino has been shown to have greater ease of insertion and reduced discomfort. Posterior nasal packing can be achieved by using a Foley catheter, blowing up the balloon when it is in the back of the throat, and applying anterior traction so that the inflated balloon occludes the choanae. Patients who receive non-dissolvable nasal packing need to return to a medical professional in 24–72 hours in order to have packing removed. Complications of non-dissolvable nasal packing include abscesses, septal hematomas, sinusitis, and pressure necrosis. In rare cases toxic shock syndrome can occur with prolonged nasal packing. As a result, any patient who has non-dissolvable nasal packing should be given prophylactic antibiotic medication to be taken as long as the nasal packing remains in the nose.

=== Surgery ===
Ongoing bleeding despite good nasal packing is a surgical emergency and can be treated by endoscopic evaluation of the nasal cavity under general anesthesia to identify an elusive bleeding point or to directly ligate (tie off) the blood vessels supplying the nose. These blood vessels include the sphenopalatine, anterior and posterior ethmoidal arteries. More rarely the maxillary or a branch of the external carotid artery can be ligated. The bleeding can also be stopped by intra-arterial embolization using a catheter placed in the groin and threaded up the aorta to the bleeding vessel by an interventional radiologist. There is no difference in outcomes between embolization and ligation as treatment options, but embolization is considerably more expensive. Continued bleeding may be an indication of more serious underlying conditions.

=== Tranexamic acid ===
Tranexamic acid helps promote blood clotting. For nosebleeds it can be applied to the site of bleeding, taken by mouth, or injected into a vein.

=== Other ===
The utility of local cooling of the head and neck is controversial. Some state that applying ice to the nose or forehead is not useful. Others feel that it may promote vasoconstriction of the nasal blood vessels and thus be useful. In Indonesian traditional medicine, betel leaf is used to stop nosebleeds as it contains tannin which causes blood to coagulate, thus stopping active bleeding.

== Society and culture ==
In the visual language of Japanese manga and anime, a nosebleed (鼻血, hanaji) often indicates that the bleeding person is sexually aroused. In Western fiction, nosebleeds often signify intense mental focus or effort, particularly during the use of psychic powers.

In American and Canadian usage, "nosebleed section" and "nosebleed seats" are common slang for seating at sporting or other spectator events that are the highest up and furthest away from the event. The reference alludes to the propensity for nasal hemorrhage at high altitudes, usually owing to lower barometric pressure.

The oral history of the Native American Sioux tribe includes reference to women who experience nosebleeds as a result of a lover's playing of music, implying sexual arousal.

In the Finnish language, "picking blood from one's nose" and "begging for a nosebleed" are commonly used in abstract meaning to describe self-destructive behaviour, for example ignoring safety procedures or deliberately aggravating stronger parties.

In Filipino slang, to "have a nosebleed" is to have serious difficulty conversing in English with a fluent or native English speaker. It can also refer to anxiety brought on by a stressful event such as an examination or a job interview.

In the Dutch language, "pretending to have a nosebleed" is a saying that means pretending not to know anything about something.

=== Etymology ===
The word epistaxis is from Ancient Greek: ἐπιστάζω epistazo, "to bleed from the nose" from ἐπί epi, "above, over" and στάζω stazo, "to drip [from the nostrils]".
