= Roderich Stintzing =

German internist

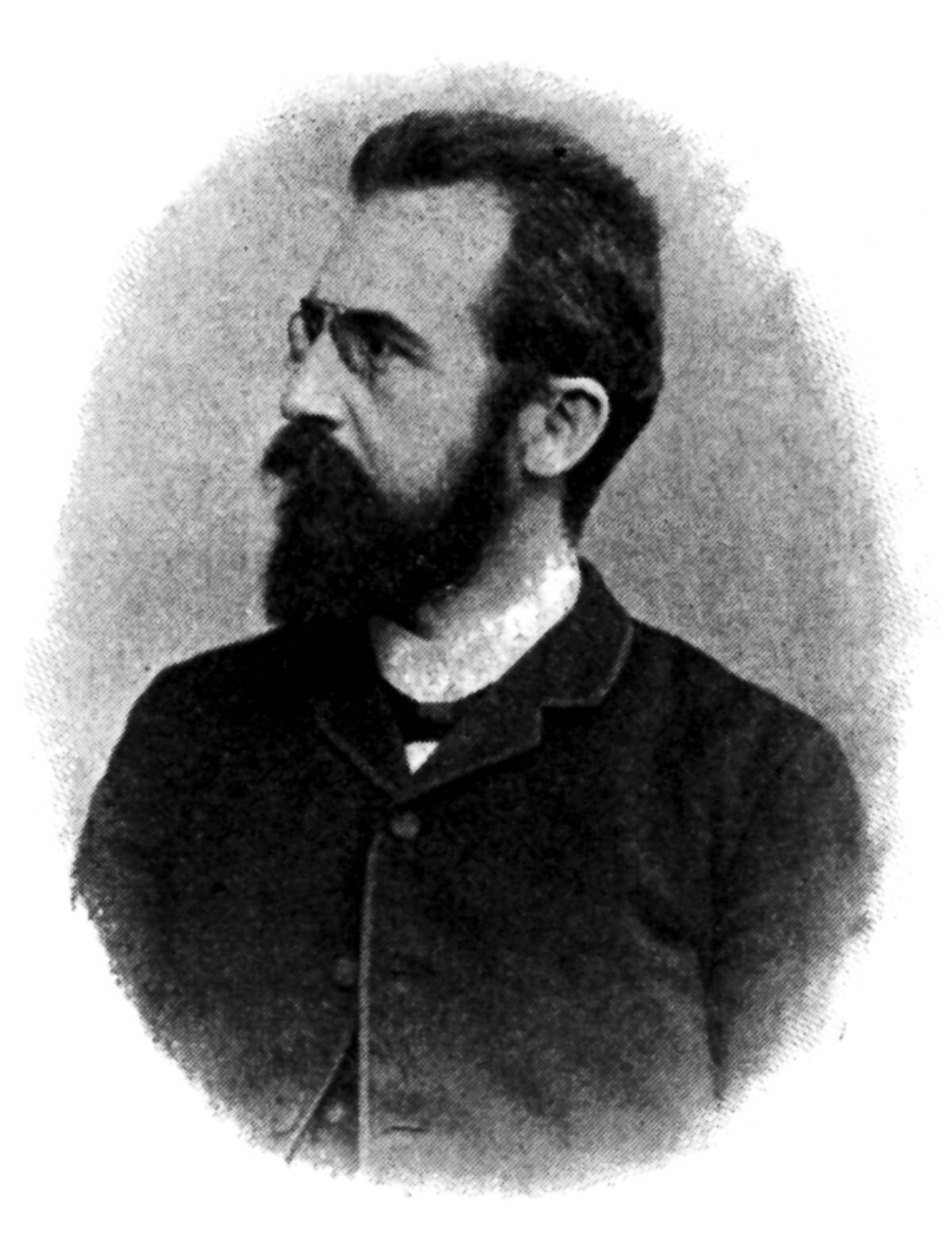
Roderich Stintzing

Georg Hieronymus Roderich Stintzing (12 February 1854 – 5 April 1933) was a German internist born in Heidelberg.

Stintzing studied medicine at the University of Bonn, Leipzig University, and the University of Tübingen, receiving his doctorate in 1878 at the University of Bonn. Following graduation, he remained at the University of Bonn as an assistant at the institute of physiology of Eduard Pflüger (1829–1910). Later he was an assistant to Hugo von Ziemssen (1829–1902) at the medical clinic at the Ludwig-Maximilians-Universität München, and in 1890 became an associate professor and director of the medical clinic at the University of Jena.

In 1892, Stintzing attained the title of "full professor" at the University of Jena. One of his better known assistants was internist Ferdinand Gumprecht (1864–1947).

"Stintzing's tables" are tables containing readings on the electrical excitability of nerves and muscles in normal individuals.

== Written works ==
With Franz Penzoldt (1849–1927), he was co-editor of the six volume "Handbuch der speciellen Therapie innerer Krankheiten" (1894–96).

- 1. Bd. "Infektionskrankheiten" – Infectious diseases.
- 2. Bd. "Vergiftungen; Stoffwechsel-, Blut-, und Lymphkrankheiten" – Metabolic, blood and lymphatic diseases.
- 3. Bd. "Erkrankungen der Atmungsorgane und der Kreislaufsorgane" – Diseases of the respiratory system and the circulatory organs.
- 4. Bd. "Erkrankungen der Verdauungsorgane" – Disorders of the digestive organs.
- 5. Bd. "Erkrankungen des Bewegungsapparates und des Nervensystems; Geisteskrankheiten" – Diseases of the musculoskeleton and nervous system. Mental illness.
- 6. Bd. "Venerische Krankheiten; Erkrankungen der Harn- und Geschlechtswerkzeuge, sowie der Haut" – Venereal diseases; diseases of the urinary and sexual organs. Skin diseases.
