= Ottomar Rosenbach =

German physician

Ottomar Ernst Felix Rosenbach (4 January 1851 in Krappitz, Silesia – 20 March 1907) was a German physician.

Krappitz was a Silesian city where his father, Samuel Rosenbach, practised medicine. He received his education at the universities of Berlin and Breslau (M.D. 1874). His studies were interrupted by the Franco-Prussian War, in which he took an active part as a volunteer. From 1874 to 1877 he was assistant to Wilhelm Olivier Leube (1842-1922) and Carl Wilhelm Hermann Nothnagel (1841-1905) at the medical hospital and dispensary of the University of Jena; in 1878 he was appointed assistant at the Allerheiligen-Hospital at Breslau, and became privatdozent at the university of that city; in 1887 he became chief of the medical department of the hospital, which position he resigned in 1893; and in 1888 he was appointed assistant professor. In 1896 he resigned his professorship and removed to Berlin, where he practised until his death.

He discovered unusual eye tremors when the eyelids are closed in patients with Graves disease, now known as "Rosenbach's sign (eye)". He also described a clinical sign for aortic regurgitation (involving systolic pulsations of the liver) that too is referred to as "Rosenbach's sign (liver)".

== Literary works ==
Rosenbach wrote many essays for the medical journals, and is one of the collaborators on Albert Eulenburg's "Realencyclopädie der Gesammten Heilkunde" () (all three editions) and on Carl Nothnagel's "Spezielle Pathologie und Therapie" ().

Of his works may be mentioned:

- "Studien über den Nervus Vagus", Berlin, 1877; ()
- "Grundlagen, Aufgaben und Grenzen der Therapie", Vienna, 1891; ()
- "Die Entstehung und Hygienische Behandlung der Bleichsucht", Leipzig, 1893; ()
- "Die Grundlagen der Lehre vom Kreislauf", Vienna, 1894; ()
- "Die Seekrankheit als Typus der Kinetosen", ib. 1896; ()
- "Die Krankheiten des Herzens und Ihre Behandlung", Berlin and Leipzig, 1897; ()
- "Grundriss der Pathologie und Therapie der Herzkrankheiten", Berlin, 1899; ()
- "Arzt Contra Bacteriologe", Vienna, 1902 (translated into English by Achille Rose, New York City, 1904) ()

== Bibliography ==
- Pagel, J. L., Biog. Lex.

By Isidore Singer & Frederick T. Haneman
