= Nasal septal abscess =

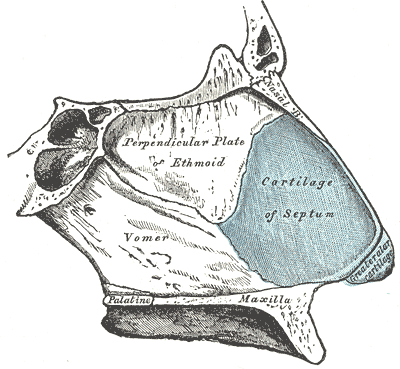
- Nasal septum(normal)
- Specialty: ENT surgery

Nasal septal abscess is a condition of the nasal septum in which there is a collection of pus between the mucoperichondrium and septal cartilage.

== Signs and symptoms ==
Individuals with this condition may also have fever, general malaise and nasal pain, including tenderness over the dorsum of the nose. A bilateral persistent nasal obstruction may also be present.

=== Complications ===
Potential complications of a nasal septal abscess include cavernous sinus thrombophlebitis, septal perforation, or saddle deformity due to cartilage necrosis.

== Cause ==
A nasal septal abscess is frequently a result of a secondary bacterial infection of a nasal septal hematoma.

== Treatment ==
Treatment for a nasal septal abscess is similar to that of other bacterial infections. Aggressive broad spectrum antibiotics may be used after the infected area has been drained of fluids.
