= Wilhelm Olivier Leube =

German internist (1842–1922)

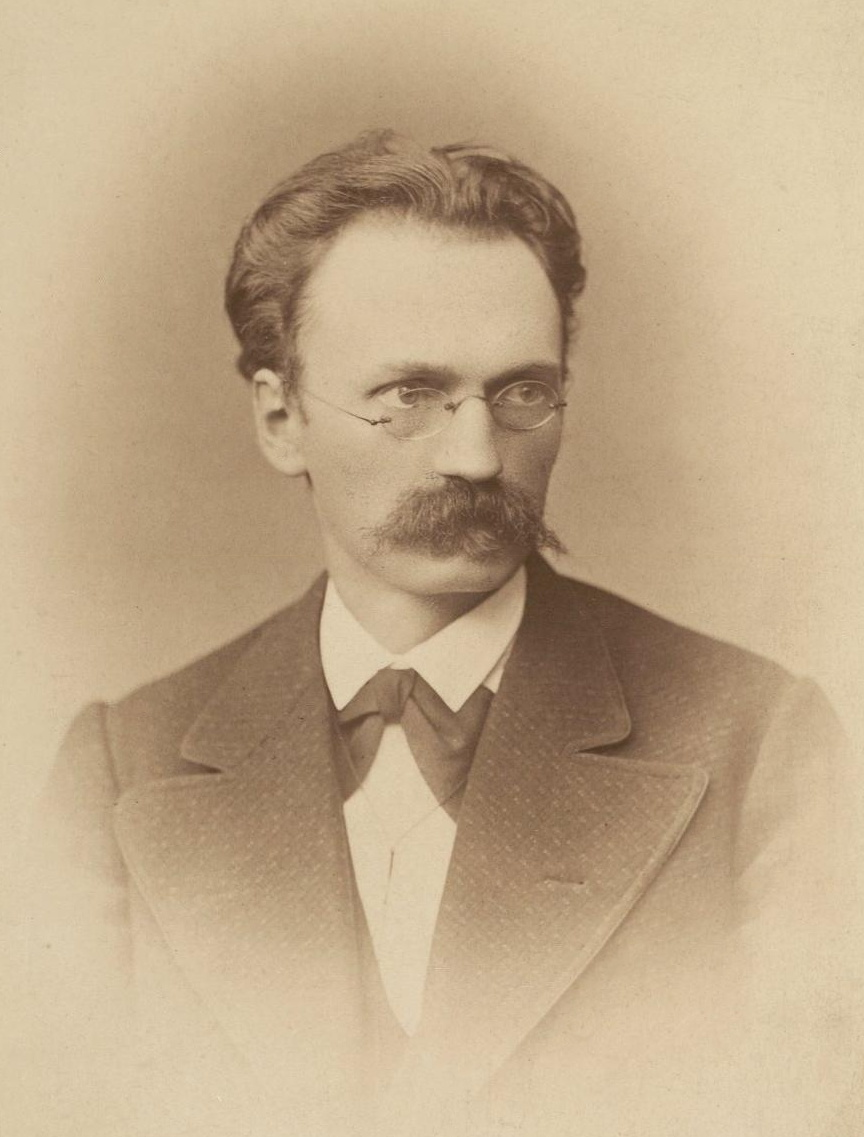
Leube in 1876

Wilhelm Olivier Leube (14 September 1842 – 16 May 1922) was a German internist born in Ulm.

He studied medicine in Tübingen, Zurich, Berlin and Munich, and from 1868 worked as an assistant at the medical clinic in Erlangen. In 1872, at the University of Jena, he became a professor of pathology and special therapy, as well as director of the medical clinic. At Jena, one of his assistants was noted physician Ottomar Rosenbach (1851–1907). Afterwards he was a professor at the Universities of Erlangen (1874–1885) and Würzburg, where in 1895/96 he served as university rector.

Wilhelm Leube is remembered for his work with gastric and intestinal disorders that included pioneer research of "nervous dyspepsia". He believed that gastric irritation was often caused by the effects of food on the sensory nerves of the stomach, and performed extensive studies on digestion. In 1871 he introduced a procedure known as intubation in order to retrieve contents of the stomach for analysis. Later he introduced "test meals" of different types of food, which would be served to patients, and afterwards retrieved via Leube's "gastric tube" at scheduled times. Through these procedures, Leube researched the degree of digestion of the test meal, as well as the quantity and concentration of acid and pepsin in the patients' stomach. With physiologist Isidor Rosenthal (1836–1915), he developed the Leube-Rosenthalsche Fleischsolution (Leube-Rosenthal meat solution).

Among Leube's written works was an influential treatise on gastro-enterological diseases called "Die Krankheiten des Magens und Darms" (1875), that was included in Hugo Wilhelm von Ziemssen's "Handbuch der speciellen Pathologie und Therapie". Leube died on 16 May 1922 at Montfort Castle on Lake Constance.
