= Orbital process of palatine bone =

Bone process of the skull

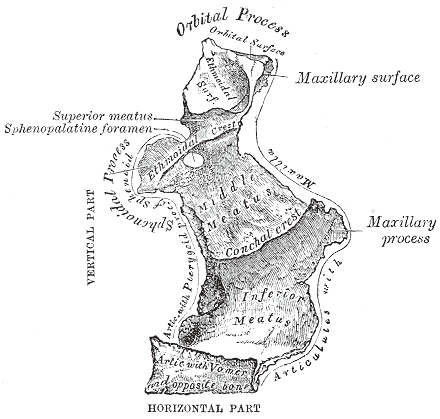
- Left palatine bone. Nasal aspect. Enlarged.

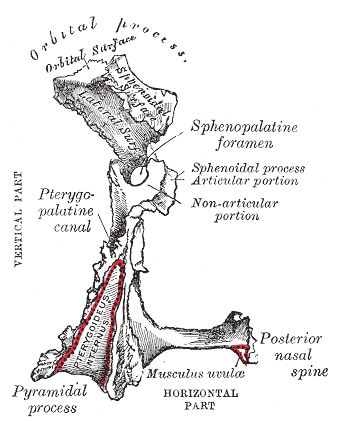
- Left palatine bone. Posterior aspect. Enlarged.

Details

Identifiers
- Latin: processus orbitalis
- TA98: A02.1.13.011
- TA2: 809
- FMA: 59143

The orbital process of the palatine bone is placed on a higher level than the sphenoidal, and is directed upward and lateralward from the front of the vertical part, to which it is connected by a constricted neck. It presents five surfaces, which enclose an air cell. Of these surfaces, three are articular and two non-articular.

The articular surfaces are:

1. the anterior or maxillary, directed forward, lateralward, and downward, of an oblong form, and rough for articulation with the maxilla
2. the posterior or sphenoidal, directed backward, upward, and medialward; it presents the opening of the air cell, which usually communicates with the sphenoidal sinus; the margins of the opening are serrated for articulation with the sphenoidal concha
3. the medial or ethmoidal, directed forward, articulates with the labyrinth of the ethmoid.

In some cases the air cell opens on this surface of the bone and then communicates with the posterior ethmoidal cells. More rarely it opens on both surfaces, and then communicates with the posterior ethmoidal cells and the sphenoidal sinus.

The non-articular surfaces are:

1. the superior or orbital, directed upward and lateralward; it is triangular in shape, and forms the back part of the floor of the orbit; and
2. the lateral, of an oblong form, directed toward the pterygopalatine fossa; it is separated from the orbital surface by a rounded border, which enters into the formation of the inferior orbital fissure.

== Additional images ==
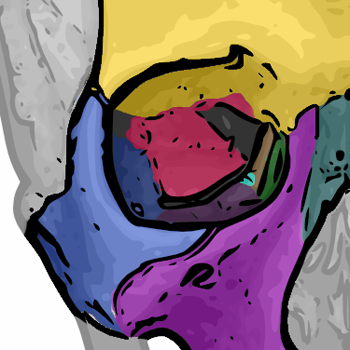
The seven bones which articulate to form the orbit.

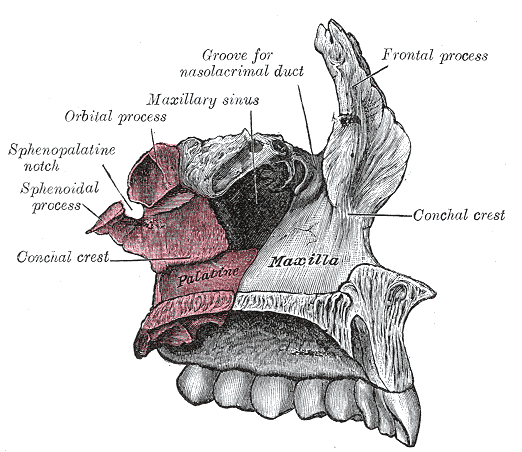
Articulation of left palatine bone with maxilla.

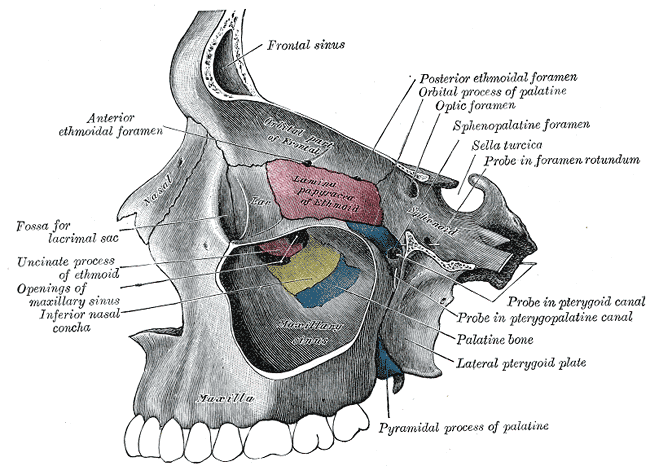
Medial wall of left orbit.
