= Sphenopalatine artery =

- Plan of branches of internal maxillary artery. (Sphenopalatine visible in upper right.)

Details
- Source: Maxillary artery
- Branches: Posterior lateral nasal branches posterior septal branches
- Supplies: Frontal, maxillary, ethmoidal, and sphenoidal sinuses

Identifiers
- Latin: arteria sphenopalatina
- TA98: A12.2.05.088
- TA2: 4460
- FMA: 49804

The sphenopalatine artery (nasopalatine artery) is an artery of the head, commonly known as the artery of epistaxis. It passes through the sphenopalatine foramen to reach the nasal cavity. It is the main artery of the nasal cavity.

== Course ==
The sphenopalatine artery is a branch of the maxillary artery which passes through the sphenopalatine foramen into the cavity of the nose, at the back part of the superior meatus. Here it gives off its posterior lateral nasal branches.

Crossing the under surface of the sphenoid, the sphenopalatine artery ends on the nasal septum as the posterior septal branches. Here it will anastomose with the branches of the greater palatine artery.

== Clinical significance ==
The sphenopalatine artery is the artery commonly responsible for epistaxis (difficult to control bleeding of the nasal cavity, especially the posterior nasal cavity). In severe nose bleed cases which do not stop after intense packing of anti-clotting agents, the sphenopalatine artery can be ligated (clipped and then cut) during open surgery or embolized (blocked with surgical glue or tiny microparticles). Embolization is typically done under fluoroscopic guidance with minimally invasive techniques (e.g. via small microcatheters inserted into arteries in the wrist or groin) by interventional radiologists.

== See also ==
- Kiesselbach's plexus
