= Silent sinus syndrome =

Collapse of an air sinus

- Other names: Imploding antrum syndrome
- Specialty: ENT surgery
- Symptoms: facial asymmetry, vision problems, headache
- Diagnostic method: symptoms, CT scan
- Differential diagnosis: sinus atelectasis, congenital sinus hypoplasia
- Treatment: surgery (endoscopic endonasal surgery)
- Frequency: rare, most common in middle age

Silent sinus syndrome is a spontaneous, asymptomatic collapse of an air sinus (usually the maxillary sinus and orbital floor) associated with negative sinus pressures. It can cause painless facial asymmetry, diplopia and enophthalmos. Diagnosis is suspected based on symptoms, and can be confirmed using a CT scan. Treatment is surgical involving making an outlet for mucous drainage from the obstructed sinus, and, in some cases, paired with reconstruction of the orbital floor. It is slightly more common in middle age.

== Signs and symptoms ==
Silent sinus syndrome can cause facial asymmetry (usually without pain), and vision problems (such as diplopia and enophthalmos). It may also cause headaches, and a feeling of fullness in the nose.

== Mechanism ==
Silent sinus syndrome most often affects the maxillary sinus, usually with a collapse of the orbital floor. It may also affect the frontal sinus or the ethmoid sinus. When the maxillary sinus is involved, the inferior oblique muscle may be damaged.

The cause of silent sinus syndrome is not well understood. Bacteria in the maxillary sinus may be involved. The connection to the nose may be blocked. This can create negative pressure in the sinus, as secretions are reabsorbed.

Risk factors for silent sinus syndrome include any anatomic condition causing obstruction of the maxillary ostium, such as ipsilateral nasal septum deviation, ipsilateral laterally deviated middle turbinate, and narrowed infundibulum.

== Diagnosis ==
Silent sinus syndrome is first suspected based on symptoms. A CT scan can be used to confirm a diagnosis. This can have characteristic features, including maxillary sinus outlet obstruction, sinus opacification, and sinus volume loss caused by inward retraction of the sinus walls.

=== Differential diagnosis ===
Silent sinus syndrome is a subtype of stage three chronic maxillary atelectasis. The distinguishing factor is that in silent sinus syndrome, there is an absence of sinusitis symptoms. To be clear, chronic maxillary sinusitis may be a primary causitive factor in a significant number of silent sinus syndrome cases, it just may be asymptomatic. Silent sinus syndrome also must be distinguished from maxillary sinus hypoplasia, which is congenital.

== Treatment ==
Silent sinus syndrome is usually treated with surgery. The first stage involves restoring sinus function, most often by performing an endoscopic uncinectomy (removal of uncinate process) and maxillary antrostomy. The second stage, if needed, involves reconstruction of the orbital floor. While some clinics perform the two stages simultaneously, most authorities recommend waiting a minimum of 6 or as many as 18 months, as spontaneous remodeling of the orbital floor after the sinus repair will occur in many if not most cases. Any prolapsed contents (such as those from the orbit) must be put back in place, though this is a rare occurrence in an already rare syndrome. If the inferior oblique muscle is damaged, it may be partially removed (known as myectomy). Mucus and secretions must be drained from the sinus. Earlier treatment has better outcomes.

== Epidemiology ==
Silent sinus syndrome is fairly rare. It can occur at any age, but is slightly more common in middle-aged people. It occurs equally in sinuses on each side of the face.

== History ==
Silent sinus syndrome was first described in 1964.
