= Body orifice =

Functional opening in the body of an organism

A body orifice is any opening in the body of an organism.

== External ==
In a typical mammalian body such as the human body, the external body orifices are:

- The nostrils, for breathing and the associated sense of smell
- The mouth, for eating, drinking, breathing, and vocalizations such as speech
- The ear canals, for the sense of hearing
- The nasolacrimal ducts, to carry tears from the lacrimal sac into the nasal cavity
- The anus, for defecation
- The urinary meatus, for urination, male ejaculation, and female ejaculation
- In females, the vagina, for menstruation, copulation and birth
- The nipple orifices

Other animals may have some other body orifices:

- cloaca, in birds, reptiles, amphibians, and a few mammals, such as monotremes
- siphon in mollusks, arthropods, and some other animals

== Internal ==
Internal orifices include the orifices of the outflow tracts of the heart between the heart valves.

== See also ==
- Internal urethral orifice
- Mucosa
- Mucocutaneous boundary
- Meatus
- Body cavity
- Body Orifice Scanning System
