= Frontonasal duct =

Duct in the nose

Details

Identifiers
- Latin: ductus frontonasalis

The frontonasal duct is a duct through which either frontal sinus drains into the nasal cavity. Each frontal sinus opens into the frontonasal duct by an opening (the opening of frontal sinus or frontal sinus aperture) on the inferomedial part of the floor of the sinus. The frontonasal duct passes inferior-ward to open either into the middle nasal meatus at the anterior end of the ethmoidal infundibulum, or into the anterior ethmoidal air cells (which then in turn drain into the nasal cavity).

The duct is lined by mucous membrane.

== Clinical significance ==
Frontal bone fractures may result in damage to the frontonasal duct, resulting in impaired drainage of the frontal sinus and consequent predisposition to intracranial spread of infection, and the development of mucocele in the frontal sinus. Frontal sinus wall fractures may require the frontonasal duct to be sealed and the epithelium of the sinus to be excised.
