= Orbital blowout fracture =

Blowout fracture
- Other names: Orbital floor fracture
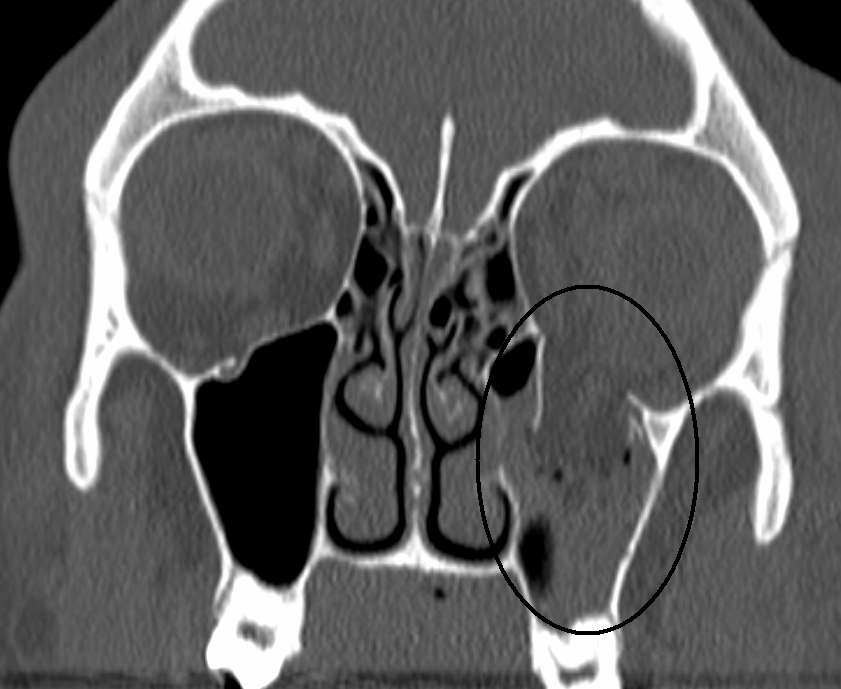
- An orbital blowout fracture of the floor of the left orbit.
- Specialty: Oral & Maxillofacial Surgery, ENT surgery, plastic surgery, ophthalmology
- Symptoms: Double vision especially when looking up, numbness of the lateral nose skin, the cheek below the eyelid, and the upper lip, Bloody nose, lateral subconjunctival hemorrhage (bright red blood over the sclera (white of the eye))
- Causes: Direct trauma to the eye socket.

An orbital blowout fracture is a traumatic deformity of the orbital floor or medial wall that typically results from the impact of a blunt object larger than the orbital aperture, or eye socket. Most commonly this results in a herniation of orbital contents through the orbital fractures. The proximity of maxillary and ethmoidal sinus increases the susceptibility of the floor and medial wall for the orbital blowout fracture in these anatomical sites. Most commonly, the inferior orbital wall, or the floor, is likely to collapse, because the bones of the roof and lateral walls are robust. Although the bone forming the medial wall is the thinnest, it is buttressed by the bone separating the ethmoidal air cells. The comparatively thin bone of the floor of the orbit and roof of the maxillary sinus has no support and so the inferior wall collapses mostly. Therefore, medial wall blowout fractures are the second-most common, and superior wall, or roof and lateral wall, blowout fractures are uncommon and rare, respectively. They are characterized by double vision, sunken ocular globes, and loss of sensation of the cheek and upper gums from infraorbital nerve injury.

The two broad categories of blowout fractures are open door and trapdoor fractures. Open door fractures are large, displaced and comminuted, and trapdoor fractures are linear, hinged, and minimally displaced. The hinged orbital blowout fracture is a fracture with an edge of the fractured bone attached on either side.

In pure orbital blowout fractures, the orbital rim (the most anterior bony margin of the orbit) is preserved, but with impure fractures, the orbital rim is also injured. With the trapdoor variant, there is a high frequency of extra-ocular muscle entrapment despite minimal signs of external trauma, a phenomenon that is referred to as a "white-eyed" orbital blowout fracture. The fractures can occur of pure floor, pure medial wall or combined floor and medial wall. They can occur with other injuries such as transfacial Le Fort fractures or zygomaticomaxillary complex fractures. The most common causes are assault and motor vehicle accidents. In children, the trapdoor subtype are more common. Smaller fractures are associated with a higher risk of entrapment of the nerve and therefore often smaller fracture are more serious injuries. Large orbital floor fractures have less chance of restrictive strabismus due to nerve entrapment but a greater chance of enopthalmus.

There are a lot of controversies in the management of orbital fractures. the controversies debate on the topics of timing of surgery, indications for surgery, and surgical approach used. Surgical intervention may be required to prevent diplopia and enophthalmos. Patients not experiencing enophthalmos or diplopia and having good extraocular mobility may be closely followed by ophthalmology without surgery.

== Signs and symptoms ==
Some clinically observed signs and symptoms include:

- Orbital pain
- Eyes displaced posteriorly into sockets (enophthalmos)
- Limitation of eye movement (restrictive strabismus)
- Loss of sensation (hypoesthesia) along the trigeminal (V2) nerve distribution
- Seeing-double when looking up or down (vertical diplopia)
- Orbital and lid subcutaneous emphysema, especially when blowing the nose or sneezing
- Nausea and bradycardia due to oculocardiac reflex
- Inability to elevate eyeball, and move eyeball downward due to inferior rectus entrapment
- Bruising/ecchymosis
- Decreased movement of eyes
- Cranial nerve palsies (III, IV, VI)
- subconjunctival hemorrhage

== Causes ==
Common medical causes of blowout fracture may include:

- Direct orbital blunt injury
- Sports injury (squash ball, tennis ball etc.)
- Motor vehicle accidents
- Falls
- Assault
- sports
- work-related injuries
- Any source of direct force

== Mechanism ==
There are two prevailing theories to how orbital fractures occur. The first theory is the hydraulic theory. The hydraulic theory states that a force is applied to the globe which results in equatorial expansion of the globe due to increasing hydrostatic pressure. The pressure is eventually released at the weaker point in the orbit (the medial and inferior walls). Theoretically, this mechanism should lead to more fractures of the medial wall than the floor, since the medial wall is slightly thinner (0.25 mm vs 0.50 mm). However, it is known that pure blowout fractures most frequently involve the orbital floor. This may be attributed to the honeycomb structure of the numerous bony septa of the ethmoid sinuses, which support the lamina papyracea, thus allowing it to withstand the sudden rise in intraorbital hydraulic pressure better than the orbital floor.

The second prevailing theory is known as the buckling theory. The buckling theory states that a force is transmitted directly to the facial skeleton and then a ripple effect is transmitted to the orbit and causes buckling at the weakest points as described above.

In children, the flexibility of the actively developing floor of the orbit fractures in a linear pattern that snaps backward. This is commonly referred to as a trapdoor fracture. The trapdoor can entrap soft-tissue contents, thus causing permanent structural change that requires surgical intervention.

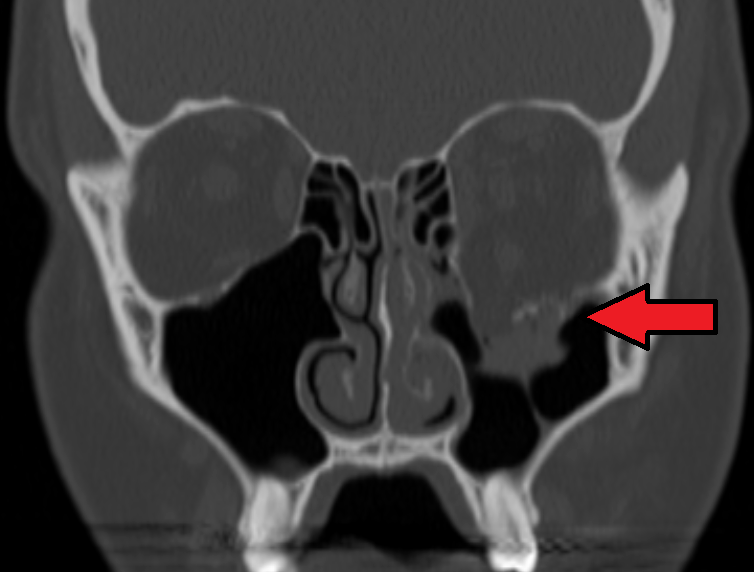
orbital blowout fracture demonstrating enophthalmos

== Diagnosis ==
Diagnosis is based on clinical and radiographic evidence. Periorbital bruising and subconjunctival hemorrhage are indirect signs of a possible fracture.

=== Anatomy ===
The bony orbital anatomy is composed of 7 bones: the maxillary, zygomatic, frontal, lacrimal, sphenoid, palatine, and ethmoidal. The floor of the orbit is the roof of the maxillary sinus. The medial wall of the orbit is the lateral wall of the ethmoid sinus. The medial wall is also known as the lamina papyrcea which means "paper layer." This demonstrates the thinness which is associated with increased fractures. The clinically important structures surrounding the orbit include the optic nerve at the apex of the orbit as well as the superior orbital fissure which contains cranial nerves 3, 4, and 6 therefore controlling ocular muscles of eye movement. Inferior to the orbit is the infraorbital nerve which is purely sensory. Five cranial nerves (optic, oculomotor, trochlear, trigeminal, and abducens), and several vascular bundles, pass through the orbital socket.

=== Imaging ===
Thin cut (2-3mm) CT scan with axial and coronal view is the optimal study of choice for orbital fractures.

Plain radiographs, on the other hand, do not have the sensitively capture blowout fractures. On Water's view radiograph, polypoid mass can be observed hanging from the floor into the maxillary antrum, classically known as teardrop sign, as it usually is in shape of a teardrop. This polypoid mass consists of herniated orbital contents, periorbital fat and inferior rectus muscle. The affected sinus is partially opacified on radiograph. Air-fluid level in maxillary sinus may sometimes be seen due to presence of blood. Lucency in orbits (on a radiograph) usually indicate orbital emphysema.

== Treatment ==
=== Initial management ===
All patients should follow-up with an ophthalmologist within 1 week of the fracture. To prevent orbital emphysema, patients are advised to avoid blowing of the nose. Nasal decongestants are commonly used. It is also common practice to administer prophylactic antibiotics when the fracture enters a sinus, although this practice is largely anecdotal. Amoxicillin-clavulanate and azithromycin are most commonly used. Oral corticosteroids are used to decrease swelling.

=== Surgery ===
Surgery is indicated if there is enophthalmos greater than 2 mm on imaging, Double vision on primary or inferior gaze, entrapment of extraocular muscles, or the fracture involves greater than 50% of the orbital floor. When not surgically repaired, most blowout fractures heal spontaneously without significant consequence.

Surgical repair of a "blowout" is rarely undertaken immediately; it can be safely postponed for up to two weeks, if necessary, to let the swelling subside. Surgery to treat the fracture generally leaves little or no scarring and the recovery period is usually brief. Ideally, the surgery will provide a permanent cure, but sometimes it provides only partial relief from double vision or a sunken eye. Reconstruction is usually performed with a titanium mesh or porous polyethylene through a transconjunctival or subciliary incision. More recently, there has been success with endoscopic, or minimally invasive, approaches.

== Surgical approaches ==
1. Transcutaneous
Transcutaneous surgery can be performed from a variety of surgical incisions. The first is known as the infraciliary incision. This incision has an advantage as the scar is barely perceivable but the disadvantage is that there is a higher rate of ectropion after repair. The next incision can be performed at the lower eyelid crease also known as the sub tarsal. This creates a more visible scar but has a lower risk of ectropion. The final incision option is infraorbital which allows the easiest access to the orbit but results in the most visible scar.

2. Transconjunctival
The advantage to this approach is direct access to the orbit and there is no skin incision. The disadvantage to this a purported decreased view of the orbit which can be offset with a canthotomy to increase the view of the orbit.

3. Endoscopic Approaches
Endoscopically, transnasal and transantral approaches had been used for reduction and support of fractured medial and inferior walls, respectively enophthalmos was improved in 89% of the endoscopic group and 76% of the external group (NS). The endoscopic group had no significant complications. The external group had ectropions, significant facial scars, extrusion of inserted Medpor, and intra-orbital hematoma.Disadvantage is working towards the globe rather than away with instruments.

== Epidemiology ==
Orbital fractures, in general, are more prevalent in men than women. In one study in children, 81% of cases were boys (mean age 12.5 years). In another study in adults, men accounted for 72% of orbital fractures (mean age 81). It has also been shown in the literature that put orbital medial wall fractures are more common in African Americans due to the increased density of their bone minerals compared to other ethnicities. However the lamina papyrcea is the same in all ethnicities so this is more commonly broken in African Americans

== History ==
Orbital floor fractures were investigated and described by MacKenzie in Paris in 1844 and the term blow out fracture was coined in 1957 by Smith & Regan, who were investigating injuries to the orbit and resultant inferior rectus entrapment, by placing a hurling ball on cadaverous orbits and striking it with a mallet.In the 1970s an occuplastic surgeon named Putterman described the first recommendations for surgery. In the 1970s Putterman advocated for repair of virtually no orbital floor fractures and instead promoted watchful waiting for up to six weeks. At the same time the Plastic surgeons put out literature recommending repair of every orbital floor fracture. Now there has been a softening from both sides and an agreeance in the middle.
