= Ethmoidal infundibulum =

Space in the nasal cavity

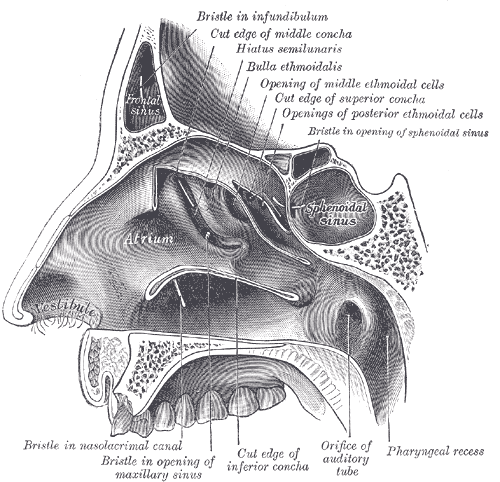
- Lateral wall of nasal cavity; the three nasal conchae have been removed (infundibulum labeled at center top).

Details

Identifiers
- Latin: infundibulum ethmoidale
- TA98: A06.1.02.027; A02.1.07.017
- TA2: 738
- FMA: 75769

The ethmoidal infundibulum is a funnel-shaped, slit-like curved opening upon the anterosuperior portion of the middle nasal meatus (and thus of the lateral wall of the nasal cavity) at the hiatus semilunaris (which represents the medial extremity of the infundibulum). The anterior ethmoidal air cells (and also medial ethmoidal air cells - variation), and usually the frontonasal duct (which drains the frontal sinus) open into the ethmoidal infundibulum. The ethmoidal infundibulum extends anterosuperiorly from its opening into the nasal cavity.

== Anatomy ==
The ethmoidal infundibulum is bordered medially by the uncinate process of the ethmoid bone, and laterally by the orbital plate of the ethmoid bone. Hiatus semilunaris and hiatus maxillaris are covered by a layer of tissue and therefore the ethmoidal infundibulum is the following part of the "tunnel" leading to meatus nasi medius.

The ethmoid infundibulum leads towards the maxillary hiatus. The anterior ethmoidal cells open into the anterior part of the infundibulum.

=== Variation ===
The frontonasal duct may or may not drain into the ethmoidal infundibulum—this is determined by the place of attachment of the uncinate process of the ethmoid bone: if the uncinate process is attached to the lateral nasal wall, the frontonasal duct will open directly into the middle nasal meatus; if otherwise, it will drain into the infundibulum. In slightly over 50% of subjects, it is directly continuous with the frontonasal duct. When the anterior end of the uncinate process fuses with the anterior part of the bulla, however, this continuity is interrupted and the frontonasal duct then drains directly into the anterior end of the middle meatus.
