= Nasal meatus =

Nasal passage of the nasal cavity

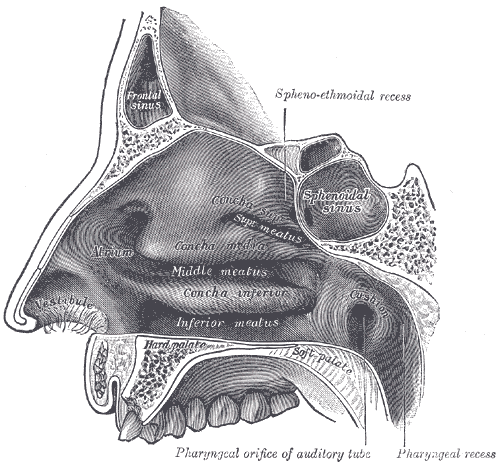
- Meatuses shown on lateral wall

Identifiers
- FMA: 53146

In anatomy, the term nasal meatus can refer to any of the three meatuses (passages) through the skull's nasal cavity: the superior meatus (meatus nasi superior), middle meatus (meatus nasi medius), and inferior meatus (meatus nasi inferior).

The nasal meatuses are the spaces lateral to each of the corresponding nasal conchae. In the case where a fourth, supreme nasal concha is present, there is a fourth supreme nasal meatus.

== Structure ==
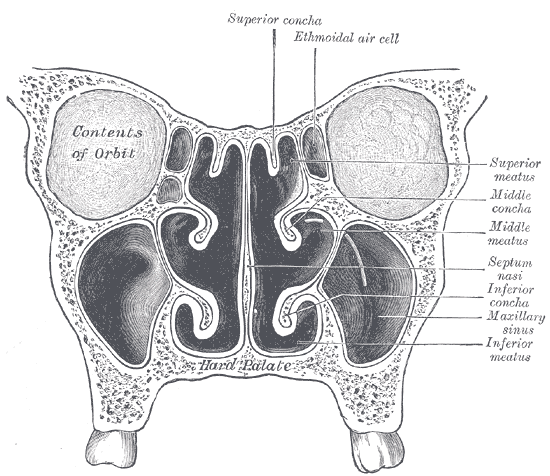
Coronal section of nasal cavity

The superior meatus is the smallest of the three. It is a narrow cavity located inferolateral to the superior concha. This meatus is short, lies superior to and extends from the middle part of the middle concha below. From behind, the sphenopalatine foramen opens into the cavity of the superior meatus and the meatus communicates with the posterior ethmoidal cells. Posterosuperior to the superior concha is the sphenoethmoidal recess which drains the sphenoidal sinus. The superior meatus occupies the middle third of the nasal cavity's lateral wall.

The middle meatus is located lateral to the middle concha and superior to the inferior concha where the meatus extends along its length. It contains the ostiomeatal complex, which comprises the maxillary ostium, bulla ethmoidalis, ethmoid infundibulum, uncinate process, and hiatus semilunaris. The hiatus semilunaris connects the ethmoid infundibulum to the middle meatus and is bordered by the uncinate process and the ethmoid bulla. The ethmoid infundibulum drains the maxillary sinus, anterior ethmoid cells, and frontal sinus to the hiatus semilunaris, which then drains into the middle meatus. In over fifty percent of skulls, the ethmoid infundibulum continues superiorly as the frontonasal duct into the frontal sinus; when this continuity fails, the frontonasal duct opens directly into the anterior part of the meatus. The anterior and posterior ethmoidal cells are contained within the middle meatus.

Below the bulla ethmoidalis and hidden by the uncinate process of the ethmoid is the opening of the maxillary sinus (ostium maxillare); an accessory opening is frequently present above the posterior part of the inferior nasal concha.

The inferior meatus is the largest of the three. It lies lateral to the inferior concha and above the nasal floor. It extends most of the length of the nasal cavity's inferolateral wall. It is broader in the front than at the back, and presents anteriorly the lower orifice of the nasolacrimal canal.
