= Semilunar hiatus =

Groove on the nasal cavity's lateral wall

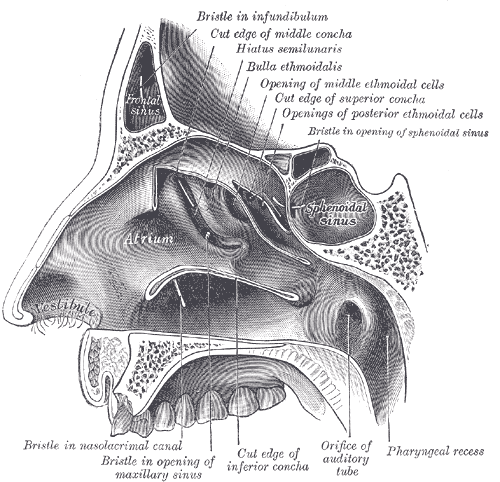
- Lateral wall of nasal cavity; the three nasal conchæ have been removed. (Third caption from the top.)

Details

Identifiers
- Latin: hiatus semilunaris
- TA98: A06.1.02.028; A02.1.07.018
- TA2: 739, 3153
- FMA: 77281 75057, 77281

The semilunar hiatus (eg, hiatus semilunaris) is a crescent-shaped/semicircular/curved slit/groove upon the lateral wall of the nasal cavity at the middle nasal meatus just inferior to the ethmoidal bulla. It is the location of the openings for the frontal sinus, maxillary sinus, and anterior ethmoidal sinus. It is bounded inferiorly and anteriorly by the sharp concave margin of the uncinate process of the ethmoid bone, superiorly by the ethmoidal bulla, and posteriorly by the ethmoidal process of the inferior nasal concha. It leads into the ethmoidal infundibulum; it marks the medial limit of the ethmoidal infundibulum.
