= Outlet obstruction =

Outlet obstruction may refer to:

- Gastric outlet obstruction (GOO)
- Bladder outlet obstruction (BOO)
- Rectal outlet obstruction (obstructed defecation)
- Thoracic outlet obstruction
- Sinus outlet obstruction
