= Maxillary hiatus =

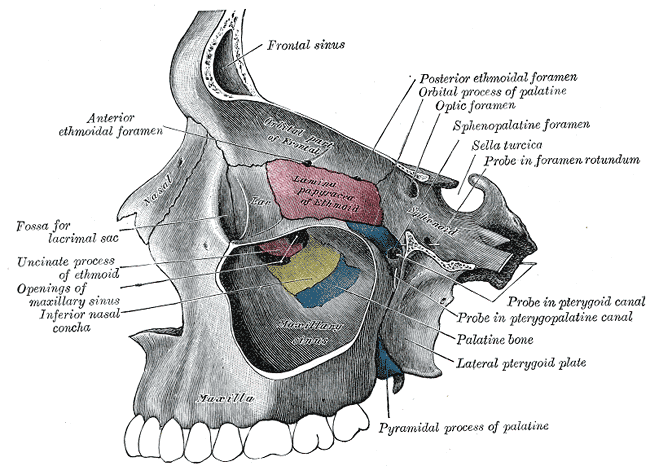
- Medial wall of left orbit

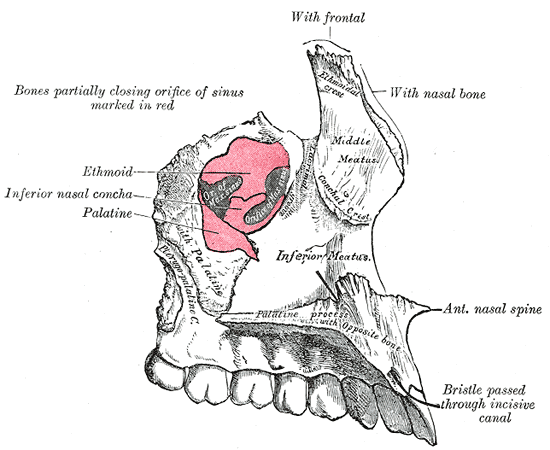
- Left maxilla. Nasal surface.

Details

Identifiers
- Latin: hiatus maxillaris, ostium maxillare
- TA98: A02.1.12.021
- TA2: 778
- FMA: 57758

The maxillary hiatus (also known as maxillary sinus ostium, maxillary ostium, or opening from the maxillary sinus) is the opening of a maxillary sinus into the middle nasal meatus of the nasal cavity. It is situated superoposteriorly upon the lateral nasal wall, opening into the nasal cavity at the posterior portion of the ethmoidal infundibulum. Its opening in the maxillary sinus is present upon the superior part of the medial wall of the sinus near the roof of the sinus; because of the position, gravity cannot drain the maxillary sinus contents when the head is erect.

An accessory maxillary hiatus may be present either anterior or posterior to the inferior portion of the uncinate process of ethmoid bone.

== Anatomy ==
It measures 2–4 mm in diameter with an average diameter of 2.4 mm.

It opens into the nasal cavity inferior to the bulla ethmoidalis, and is partly obscured by the inferior end of the uncinate process of ethmoid bone.

The bone window of this aperture itself is much larger, but the actual opening is much reduced by the following: the uncinate process of the ethmoid superiorly, the ethmoidal process of inferior nasal concha inferiorly, the perpendicular plate of palatine bone posteriorly, and a small part of the lacrimal bone anteriorly and superiorly, as well as by the adjacent soft tissues.

== Additional images ==
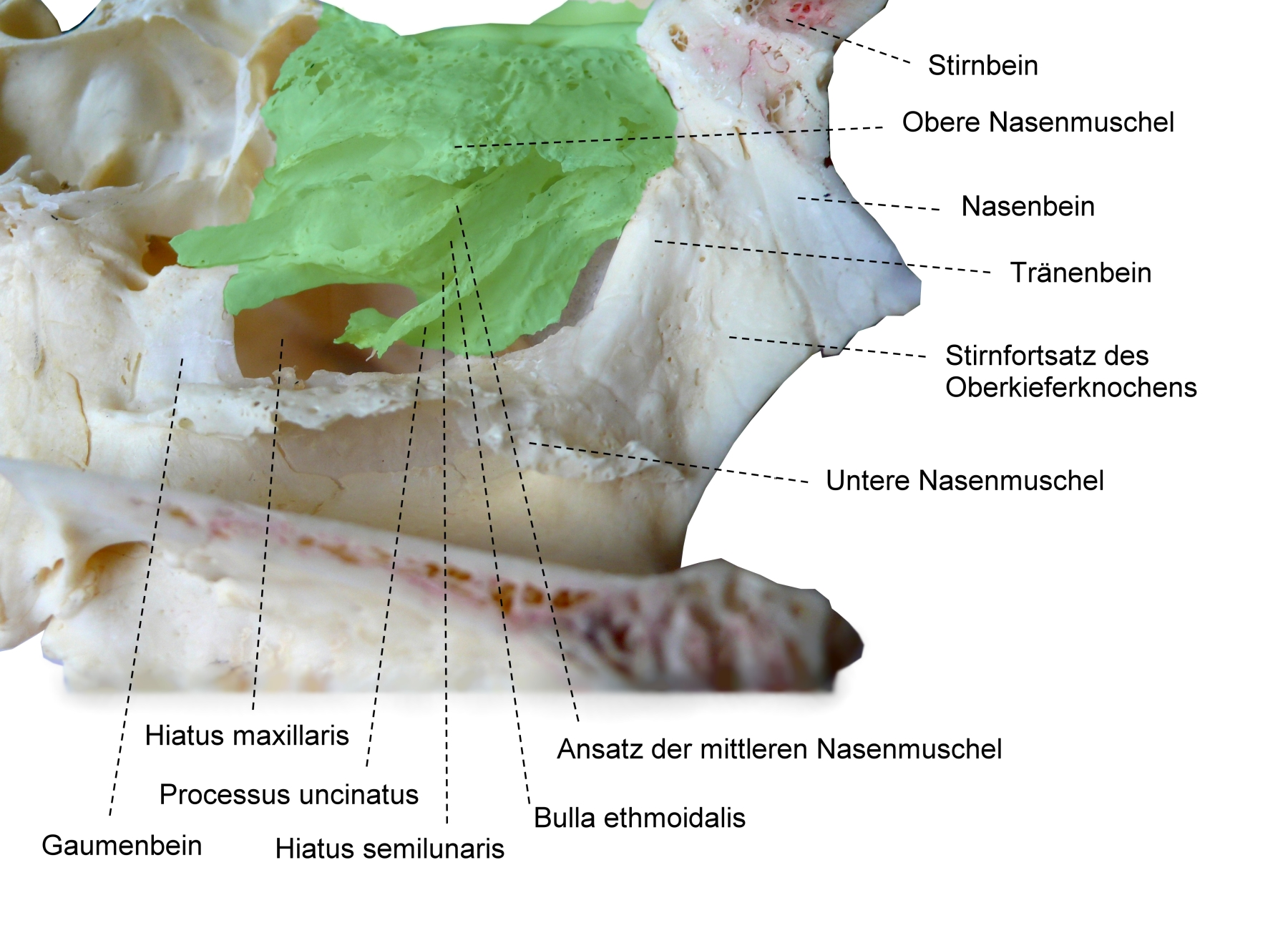
Ethmoid bone
