= Lateral mass =

Lateral mass may refer to:

- Ethmoidal labyrinth, in the skull
- Lateral mass of atlas, in the spine
