= Ethmoidal labyrinth =

Bone structure near the nasal cavity

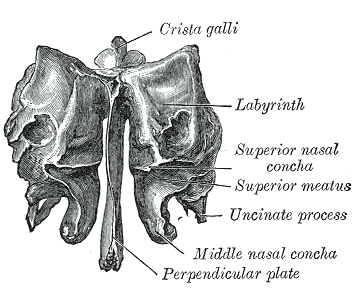
- Ethmoid bone from behind.

Details

Identifiers
- Latin: labyrinthus ethmoidalis
- TA98: A02.1.07.007
- TA2: 727
- FMA: 57448

The ethmoidal labyrinth or lateral mass of the ethmoid bone consists of a number of thin-walled cellular cavities, the ethmoid air cells, arranged in three groups, anterior, middle, and posterior, and interposed between two vertical plates of bone; the lateral plate forms part of the orbit, the medial plate forms part of the nasal cavity. In the disarticulated bone many of these cells are opened into, but when the bones are articulated, they are closed in at every part, except where they open into the nasal cavity.

== Surfaces ==
The upper surface of the labyrinth presents a number of half-broken cells, the walls of which are completed, in the articulated skull, by the edges of the ethmoidal notch of the frontal bone. Crossing this surface are two grooves, converted into two openings by articulation with the frontal; they are the anterior and posterior ethmoidal foramina, and open on the inner wall of the orbit. The posterior surface presents large irregular cellular cavities, which are closed in by articulation with the sphenoidal concha and orbital process of palatine bone. The lateral surface is formed of a thin, smooth, oblong plate, the lamina papyracea (os planum), which covers in the middle and posterior ethmoidal cells and forms a large part of the medial wall of the orbit; it articulates above with the orbital plate of the frontal bone, below with the maxilla and orbital process of the palatine, in front with the lacrimal, and behind with the sphenoid.

In front of the lamina papyracea are some broken air cells which are overlapped and completed by the lacrimal bone and the frontal process of the maxilla. A curved lamina, the uncinate process, projects downward and backward from this part of the labyrinth; it forms a small part of the medial wall of the maxillary sinus, and articulates with the ethmoidal process of the inferior nasal concha.

The medial surface of the labyrinth forms part of the lateral wall of the corresponding nasal cavity. It consists of a thin lamella, which descends from the under surface of the cribriform plate, and ends below in a free, convoluted margin, the middle nasal concha. It is rough, and marked above by numerous grooves, directed nearly vertically downward from the cribriform plate; they lodge branches of the olfactory nerves, which are distributed to the mucous membrane covering the superior nasal concha. The back part of the surface is subdivided by a narrow oblique fissure, the superior meatus of the nose, bounded above by a thin, curved plate, the superior nasal concha; the posterior ethmoidal cells open into this meatus. Below, and in front of the superior meatus, is the convex surface of the middle nasal concha; it extends along the whole length of the medial surface of the labyrinth, and its lower margin is free and thick. The lateral surface of the middle concha is concave, and assists in forming the middle meatus of the nose. The middle ethmoidal cells open into the central part of this meatus, and a sinuous passage, termed the infundibulum, extends upward and forward through the labyrinth and communicates with the anterior ethmoidal cells, and in about 50% of skulls is continued upward as the frontonasal duct into the frontal sinus.
