= Meatus =

In anatomy, a meatus (/miːˈeɪtəs/ mee-AY-təs; pl.: meatus or meatuses) is a natural body opening or canal.

Meatus may refer to:

- the external acoustic meatus, the opening of the ear canal
- the internal auditory meatus, a canal in the temporal bone of the skull
- the urinary meatus, which is the opening of the urethra, situated on the glans penis in males and in the vulval vestibule in females
- one of three nasal meatuses: the superior meatus, middle meatus and inferior meatus; each are passages through the nasal cavity within the skull.

== See also ==
- Meatal stenosis
- Fossa (anatomy)
- Foramen
