= Ethmoid bulla =

Elevation on the lateral wall of the middle meatus of the nose

Details

Identifiers
- Latin: bulla ethmoidalis
- TA98: A06.1.02.026; A02.1.07.015
- TA2: 3150, 736
- FMA: 57487

The ethmoid bulla (or ethmoidal bulla) is a rounded elevation upon the lateral wall of the middle nasal meatus (nasal cavity inferior to the middle nasal concha) produced by one or more of the underlying middle ethmoidal air cells (which open into the nasal cavity upon or superior to the ethmoidal bulla). It varies significantly based on the size of the underlying air cells.

== Structure ==
The ethmoid bulla is formed by is the largest and least variable of the middle ethmoidal air cells. The size of the bulla varies with that of its contained cells. The bulla may be a pneumatised cell or a bony prominence found in middle meatus.

=== Relations ===
The hiatus semilunaris is situated (sources differ) inferior/anterior to the ethmoid bulla. The maxillary sinus also opens below the bulla.

=== Development ===
The ethmoid bulla begins to develop between 8 weeks and 12 weeks of gestation.
