= Concha bullosa =

Anatomical feature of the human nose

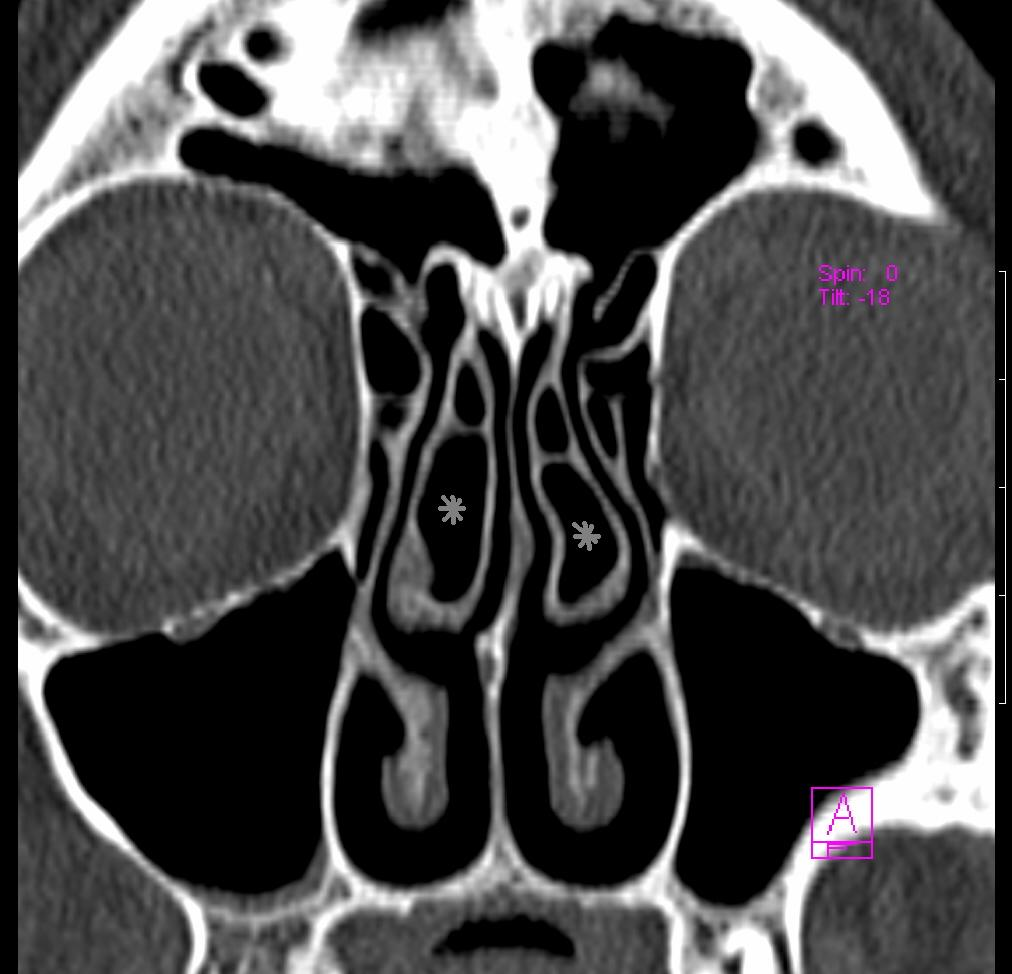
Concha bullosa on both sides (marked with asterisks), coronal orientated image from CT

A concha bullosa is a pneumatized (air-filled) cavity within a turbinate, a tissue covered functioning nasal concha. Bullosa refers to the air-filled cavity within the turbinate. It is a normal anatomic variant seen in up to half the population. Concha bullosa can occur in the inferior, middle, and superior turbinates. It is most frequently observed in the middle turbinate. Occasionally, a large concha bullosa may cause it to bulge sufficiently to obstruct the opening of an adjacent sinus, possibly leading to sleeping apnea or breathing disorder related to areas innervated by the trigeminal nerve. In such a case the turbinate can be reduced in size by endoscopic nasal surgery (turbinectomy). The presence of a concha bullosa is often associated with deviation of the nasal septum toward the opposite side of the nasal cavity.

One review of the septal surgery shows that some relief of breathing difficulty and sleeping apnea occurs in 65%-85% of surgeries. Screening of patients can cover presence of breathing difficulty when it is too large, because nasal airways are blocked by inflammation.

Some experts call pain associated with enlarged concha bullosa " will not go away with surgery when concha bullosa small in size and not blocking the airway, surgery can help for breathing improvement." In a review article of fifteen other journal articles of surgeries, not much improvements occurred after surgical treatment with a reduction from 88 to 4 (4%) patients for GRADE 3–4 MIDAS scores, and a corresponding increase in milder symptoms from GRADE 1–2 in 32 (27%) patients at 91 (76%) (p < 0.001).
