= Nose =

Organ that smells and facilitates breathing

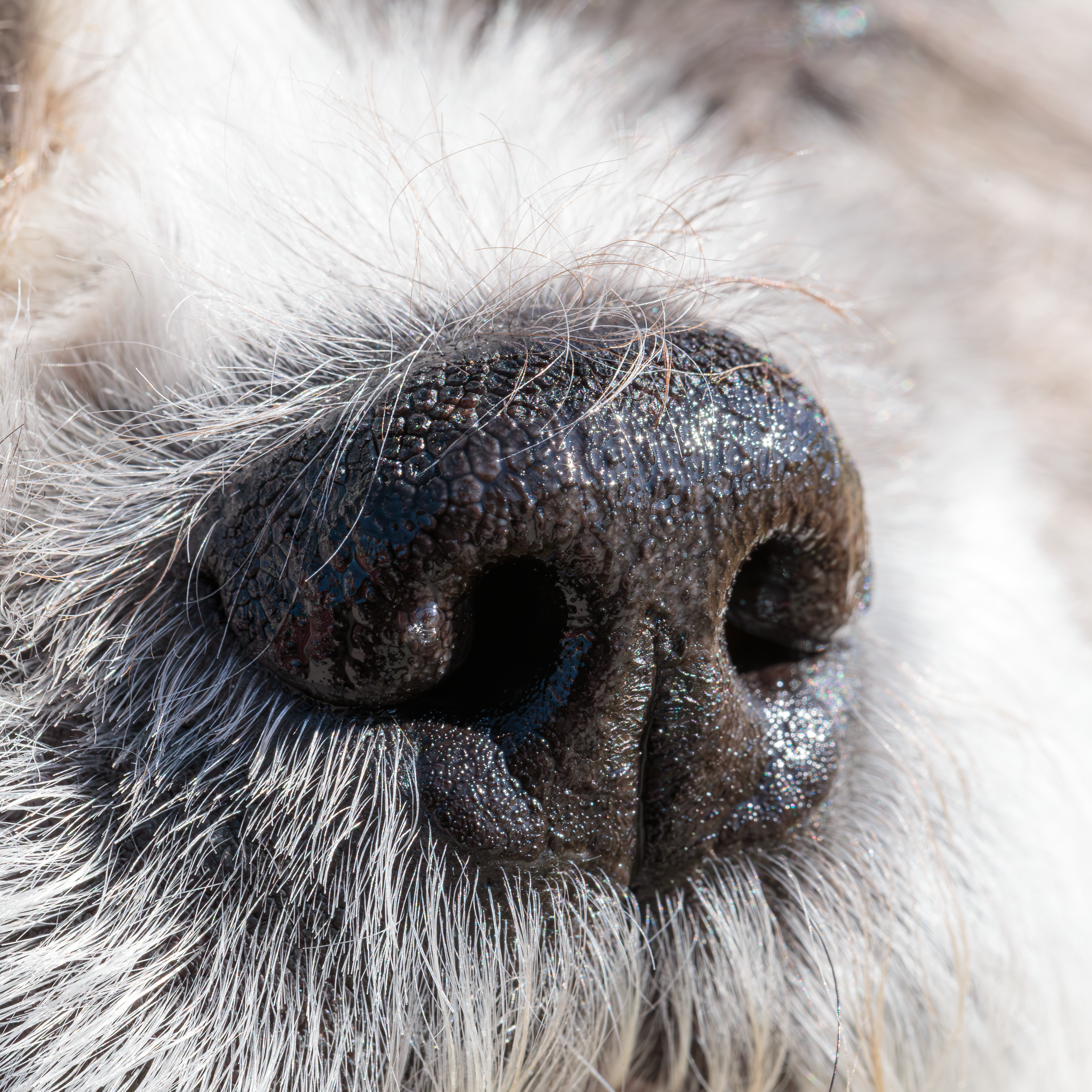
- Nose of a dog

Details

Identifiers
- Latin: nasus
- Greek: ῥίς (rhís)
- MeSH: D009666
- TA98: A06.1.01.001; A01.1.00.009
- TA2: 117

A nose is a sensory organ and respiratory structure in vertebrates. It consists of a nasal cavity inside the head, and an external nose on the face. The external nose houses the nostrils, or nares, a pair of tubes providing airflow through the nose for respiration. Where the nostrils pass through the nasal cavity they widen, are known as nasal fossae, and contain turbinates and olfactory mucosa. The nasal cavity also connects to the paranasal sinuses (dead-end air cavities for pressure buffering and humidification). From the nasal cavity, the nostrils continue into the pharynx, a switch track valve connecting the respiratory and digestive systems.

In humans, the nose is located centrally on the face and serves as an alternative respiratory passage especially during suckling for infants. The protruding nose that is completely separate from the mouth part is a characteristic found only in therian mammals. It has been theorized that this unique mammalian nose evolved from the anterior part of the upper jaw of the reptilian-like ancestors (synapsids).

== Air treatment ==
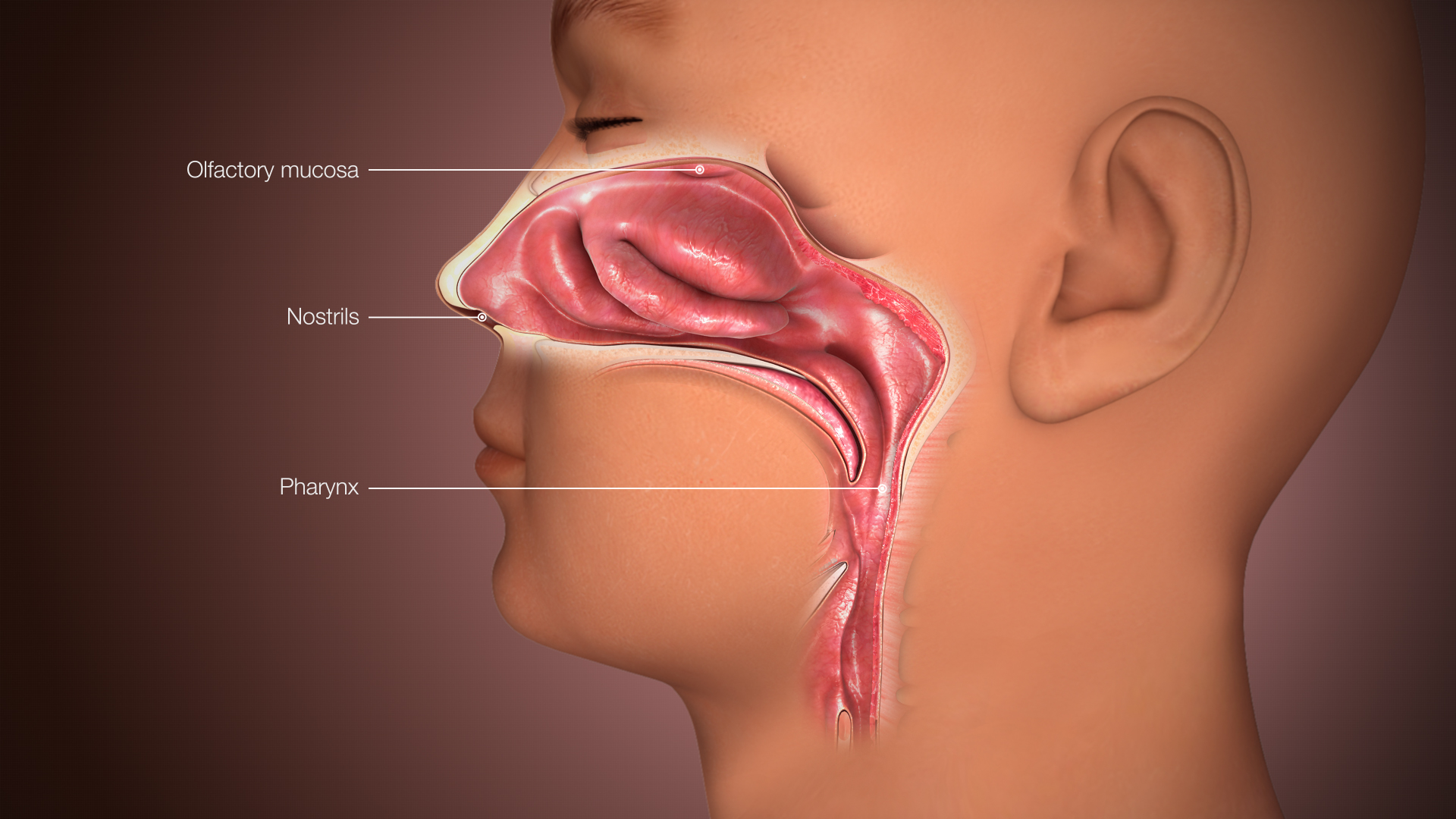
3D medical animation still shot depicting a human nose

Acting as the first interface between the external environment and an animal's delicate internal lungs, a nose conditions incoming air, both as a function of thermal regulation and filtration during respiration, as well as enabling the sensory perception of smell.

Hairs inside nostrils filter incoming air, as a first line of defense against dust particles, smoke, and other potential obstructions that would otherwise inhibit respiration, and as a kind of filter against airborne illness. In addition to acting as a filter, mucus produced within the nose supplements the body's effort to maintain temperature, as well as contributes moisture to integral components of the respiratory system. Capillary structures of the nose warm and humidify air entering the body; later, this role in retaining moisture enables conditions for alveoli to properly exchange O_{2} for CO_{2} (i.e., respiration) within the lungs. During exhalation, the capillaries then aid recovery of some moisture, mostly as a function of thermal regulation, again.

== Sense of direction ==
The wet nose of dogs is useful for the perception of direction. The sensitive cold receptors in the skin detect the place where the nose is cooled the most and this is the direction a particular smell that the animal just picked up comes from.

== Structure in air-breathing forms ==
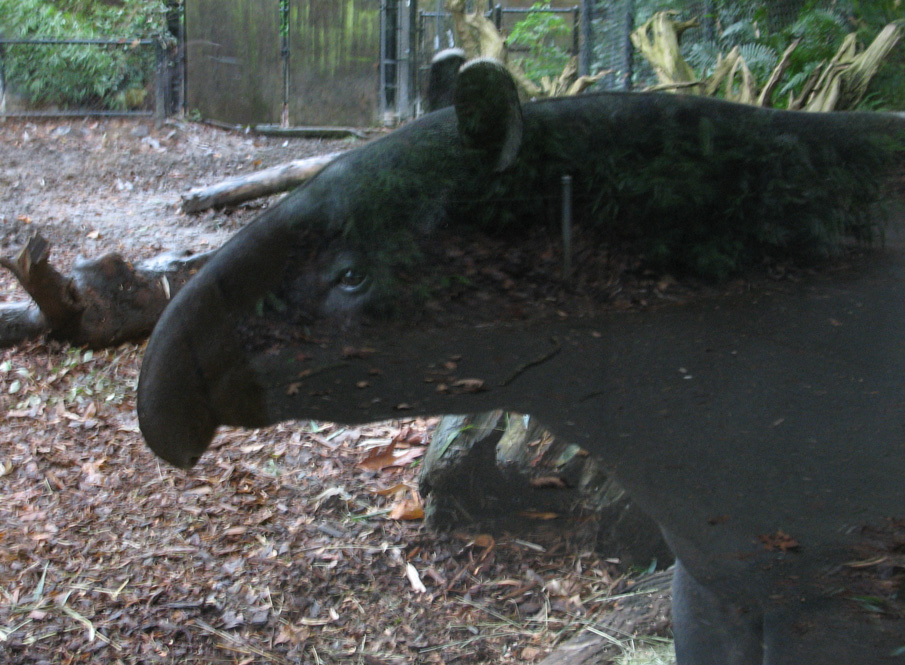
The nose of a tapir

In amphibians and lungfish, the nostrils open into small sacs that, in turn, open into the forward roof of the mouth through the choanae. These sacs contain a small amount of olfactory epithelium, which, in the case of caecilians, also lines a number of neighbouring tentacles. Despite the general similarity in structure to those of amphibians, the nostrils of lungfish are not used in respiration, since these animals breathe through their mouths. Amphibians also have a vomeronasal organ, lined by olfactory epithelium, but, unlike those of amniotes, this is generally a simple sac that, except in salamanders, has little connection with the rest of the nasal system.

In reptiles, the nasal chamber is generally larger, with the choanae located much further back in the roof of the mouth. In crocodilians, the chamber is exceptionally long, helping the animal to breathe while partially submerged. The reptilian nasal chamber is divided into three parts: an anterior vestibule, the main olfactory chamber, and a posterior nasopharynx. The olfactory chamber is lined by olfactory epithelium on its upper surface and possesses a number of turbinates to increase the sensory area. The vomeronasal organ is well-developed in lizards and snakes, in which it no longer connects with the nasal cavity, opening directly into the roof of the mouth. It is smaller in turtles, in which it retains its original nasal connection, and is absent in adult crocodilians.

Birds have a similar nose to other reptiles, with the nostrils located at the upper rear part of the beak. Since they generally have a poor sense of smell, the olfactory chamber is small, although it does contain three turbinates, which sometimes have a complex structure similar to that of mammals. In many birds, including doves and fowls, the nostrils are covered by a horny protective shield. The vomeronasal organ of birds is either under-developed or altogether absent, depending on the species.

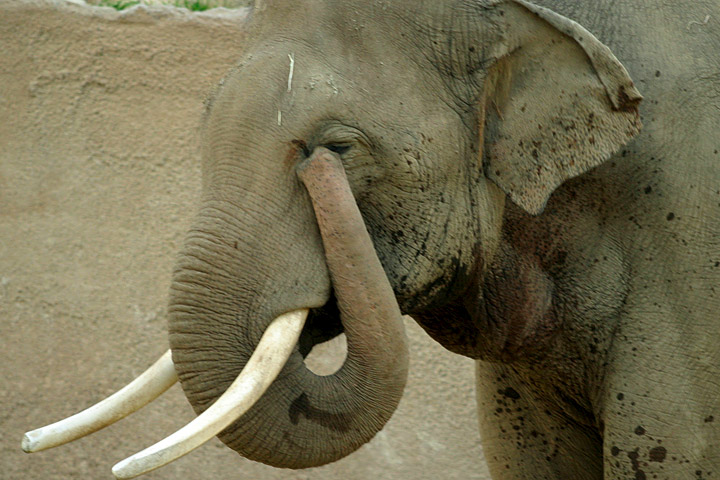
Elephants have prehensile noses.

The nasal cavities in mammals are both fused into one. Among most species, they are exceptionally large, typically occupying up to half the length of the skull. In some groups, however, including primates, bats, and cetaceans, the nose has been secondarily reduced, and these animals consequently have a relatively poor sense of smell. The nasal cavity of mammals has been enlarged, in part, by the development of a palate cutting off the entire upper surface of the original oral cavity, which consequently becomes part of the nose, leaving the palate as the new roof of the mouth. The enlarged nasal cavity contains complex turbinates forming coiled scroll-like shapes that help to warm the air before it reaches the lungs. The cavity also extends into neighbouring skull bones, forming additional air cavities known as paranasal sinuses.

In cetaceans, the nose has been reduced to one or two blowholes, which are the nostrils that have migrated to the top of the head. This adaptation gave cetaceans a more streamlined body shape and the ability to breathe while mostly submerged. Conversely, the elephant's nose has elaborated into a long, muscular, manipulative organ called the trunk.

The vomeronasal organ of mammals is generally similar to that of reptiles. In most species, it is located in the floor of the nasal cavity, and opens into the mouth via two nasopalatine ducts running through the palate, but it opens directly into the nose in many rodents. It is, however, lost in bats, and in many primates, including humans.

== In fish ==
Fish have a relatively good sense of smell. Unlike that of tetrapods, the nose has no connection with the mouth, nor any role in respiration. Instead, it generally consists of a pair of small pouches located behind the nostrils at the front or sides of the head. In many cases, each of the nostrils is divided into two by a fold of skin, allowing water to flow into the nose through one side and out through the other.

The pouches are lined by olfactory epithelium, and commonly include a series of internal folds to increase the surface area, often forming an elaborate "olfactory rosette". In some teleosts, the pouches branch off into additional sinus-like cavities, while in coelacanths, they form a series of tubes.

In the earliest vertebrates, there was only one nostril and olfactory pouch, and the nasal passage was connected to the hypophysis. The same anatomy is observed in the most primitive living vertebrates, the lampreys and hagfish. In gnathostome ancestors, the olfactory apparatus gradually became paired (presumably to allow sense of direction of smells), and freeing the midline from the nasal passage allowed evolution of jaws.

== See also ==
- Nasal bridge
- Obligate nasal breathing
- Rhinarium, the wet, naked surface around the nostrils in most mammals, absent in haplorrhine primates such as humans
