= Body Orifice Scanning System =

Type of security scanner

A body orifice scanning system (BOSS) is a type of non-invasive security scanner used to detect objects concealed within the human body, which is most commonly used in prisons. BOSSs can detect objects such as SIM cards, mobile phones and knives, whilst being harmless and efficient.

== Advantages ==
The BOSS is able to detect items as small as staples or paperclips, allowing small items to be confiscated. The system also saves times compared to alternatives, due to its efficiency. Furthermore, the system is non-intrusive, so is safer for prison officers.

== Disadvantages ==
BOSSs are expensive, with an article by the BBC noting the cost of one unit at £6,500. (Note: As of 2007.)
