= Paranasal sinuses =

Air-filled spaces surrounding the nasal cavity

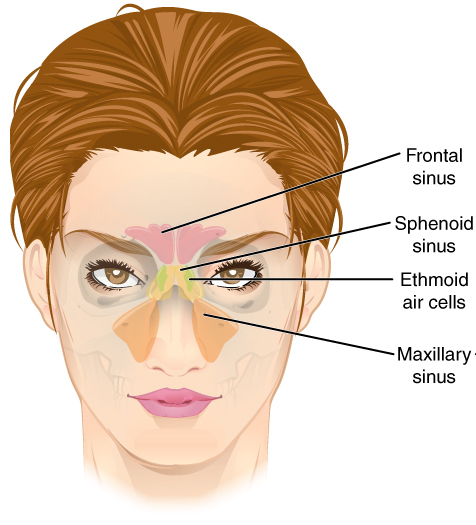
- Paranasal sinuses seen in a frontal view

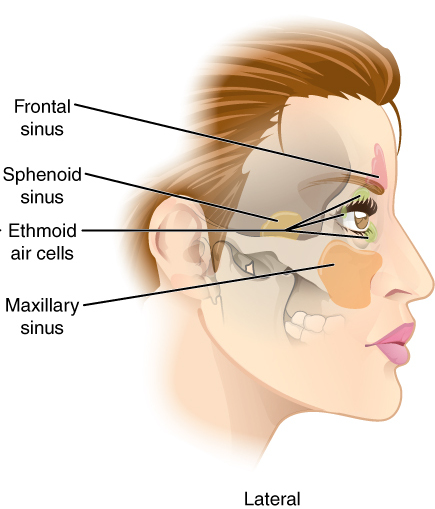
- Lateral projection of the paranasal sinuses

Details

Identifiers
- Latin: sinus paranasales
- MeSH: D010256
- TA98: A06.1.03.001
- TA2: 3176
- FMA: 59679

Paranasal sinuses are a group of four paired air-filled spaces that surround the nasal cavity. The maxillary sinuses are located below the eyes; the frontal sinuses are above the eyes; the ethmoidal sinuses (or ethmoid cells) are between the eyes, and the sphenoidal sinuses are behind the eyes. The sinuses are named according to the bones composing them, namely the frontal, maxillary, ethmoid and sphenoid bones. The evolutionary function of the sinuses is still partly debated.

== Structure ==
Humans possess four pairs of paranasal sinuses, divided into subgroups that are named according to the bones within which the sinuses lie. They are all innervated by branches of the trigeminal nerve (CN V).

- The maxillary sinuses, the largest of the paranasal sinuses, are below the eyes, in the maxillary bones (open in the back of the semilunar hiatus of the nose). They are innervated by the maxillary nerve (CN V2).
- The frontal sinuses, superior to the eyes, in the frontal bone, which forms the hard part of the forehead. They are innervated by the ophthalmic nerve (CN V1).
- The ethmoidal sinuses, which are formed from several discrete air cells within the ethmoid bone between the nose and the eyes. They are innervated by the ethmoidal nerves, which branch from the nasociliary nerve of the ophthalmic nerve (CN V1).
- The sphenoidal sinuses, in the sphenoid bone. They are innervated by the ophthalmic and maxillary nerve (CN V1 and V2).

The paranasal sinuses are lined with respiratory epithelium (ciliated pseudostratified columnar epithelium).

== Functions ==
The major functions of the paranasal sinuses are the following:

- Reduction of skull weight. The cavities, if filled by bone or soft tissue, would be heavier.
- Protection from trauma. The outer walls of the structures serve as a primary shield: the critical structures, in particular the skull base containing the brain, will not be injured by a trauma causing a sole fracture of the anterior facial bones.
- Acoustic resonance and voice modulation. The personal and unique voice signature is in great part due to the resonance pattern of our paranasal sinuses, which constitute a particularly variable anatomical structure.
- Antimicrobial activity. Production of nitric oxide, which notably acts as an antimicrobial agent because its concentration in upper airways is higher than that required for bacteriostasis and antiviral effect.
- Enhanced oxygen uptake. The nitric oxide carried into the lungs is absorbed from the alveoli into the outer surface of pulmonary arterioles, causing vasodilation and a reduction in pulmonary vascular resistance allowing for more efficient transfer of oxygen from the air into the bloodstream.

== Development ==
Paranasal sinuses form developmentally through excavation of bone by air-filled sacs (pneumatic diverticula) from the nasal cavity. This process begins prenatally (intrauterine).

The results of experimental studies suggest that the natural ventilation rate of a sinus with a single sinus ostium (opening) is extremely slow. Such limited ventilation may be protective for the sinus, as it would help prevent drying of its mucosal surface and maintain a near-sterile environment with high carbon dioxide concentrations and minimal pathogen access. Thus composition of gas content in the maxillary sinus is similar to venous blood, with high carbon dioxide and lower oxygen levels compared to breathing air.

At birth, only the maxillary sinus and the ethmoid sinus are developed but not yet pneumatized; only by the age of seven are they fully aerated. The sphenoid sinus appears at the age of three, and the frontal sinuses first appear at the age of six, and fully develop during adulthood.

=== CT scans, radiographs (X-rays) and other illustrations ===
Coronal CT scan of the paranasal sinuses (soft tissue)

Coronal CT scan of the paranasal sinuses (bone)

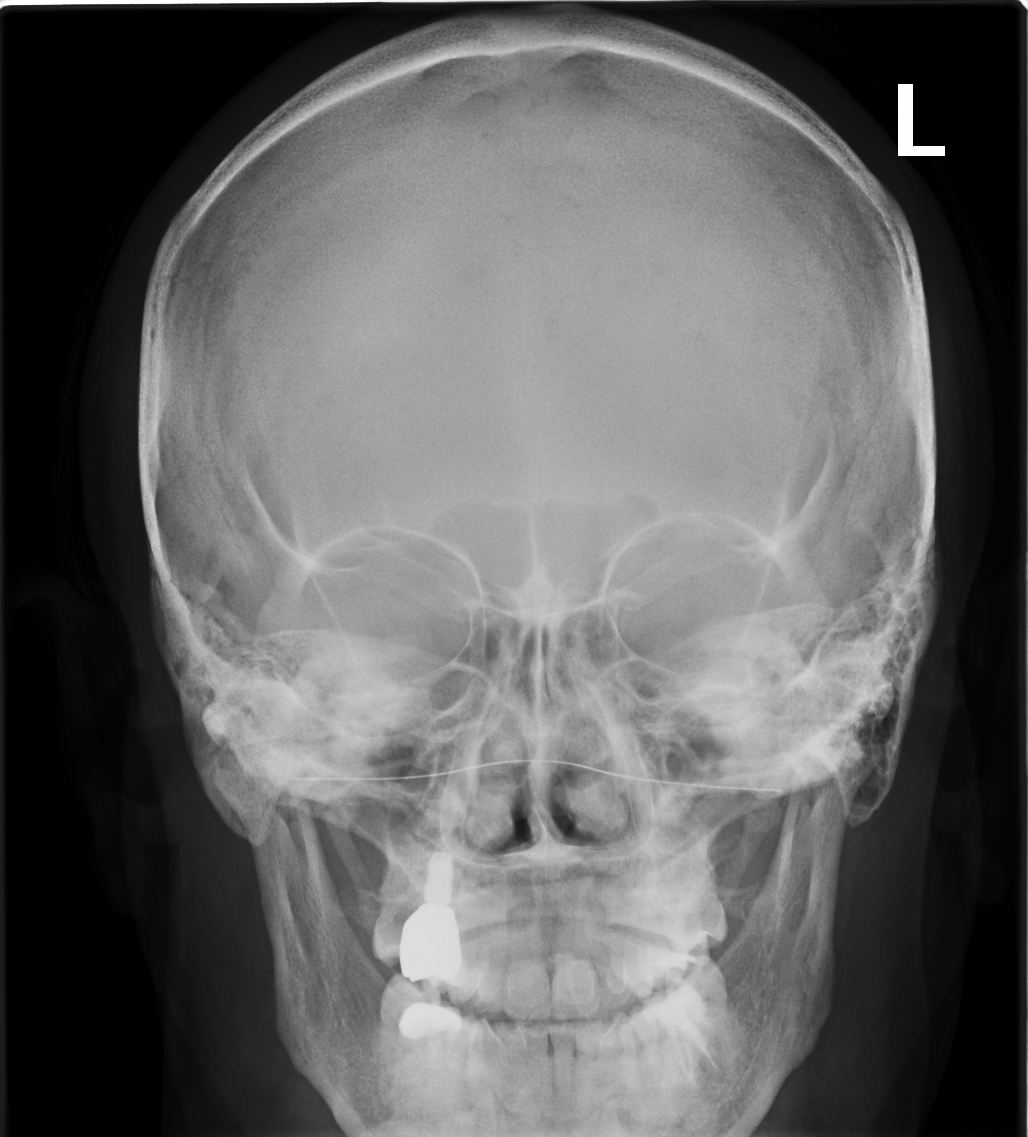
Paranasal sinuses radiograph (occipitofrontal)

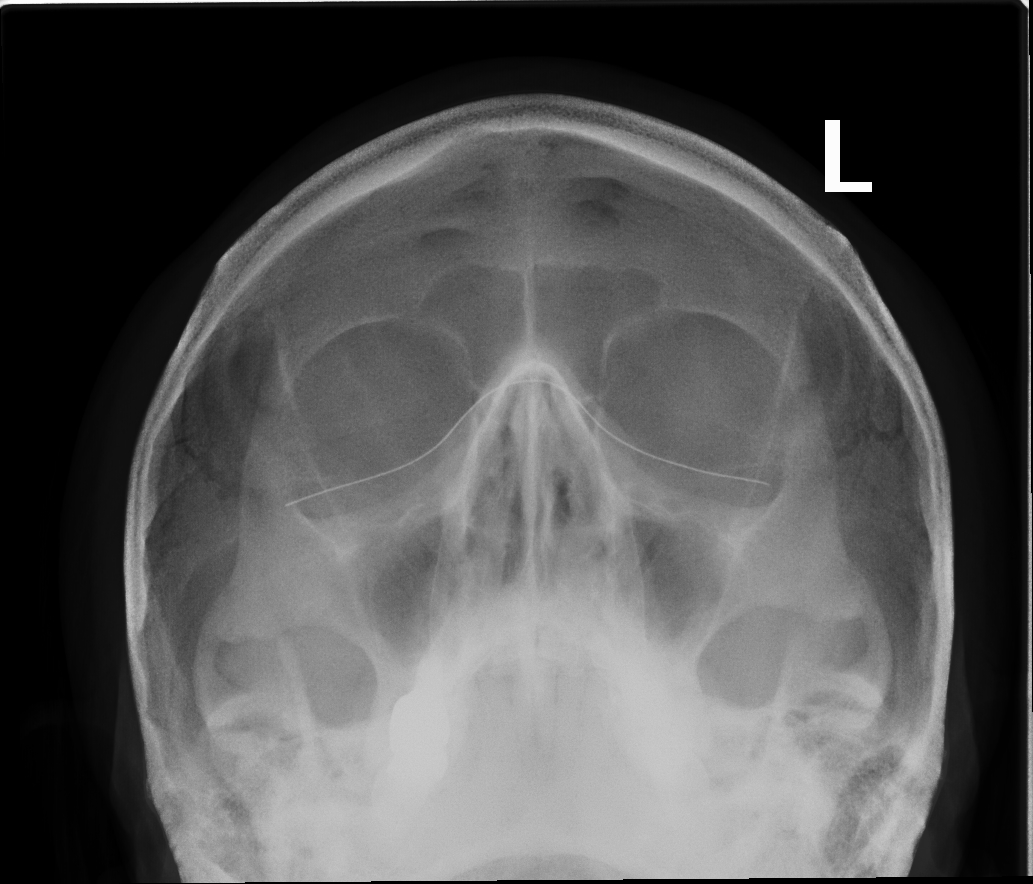
Paranasal sinuses radiograph (occipitomental)

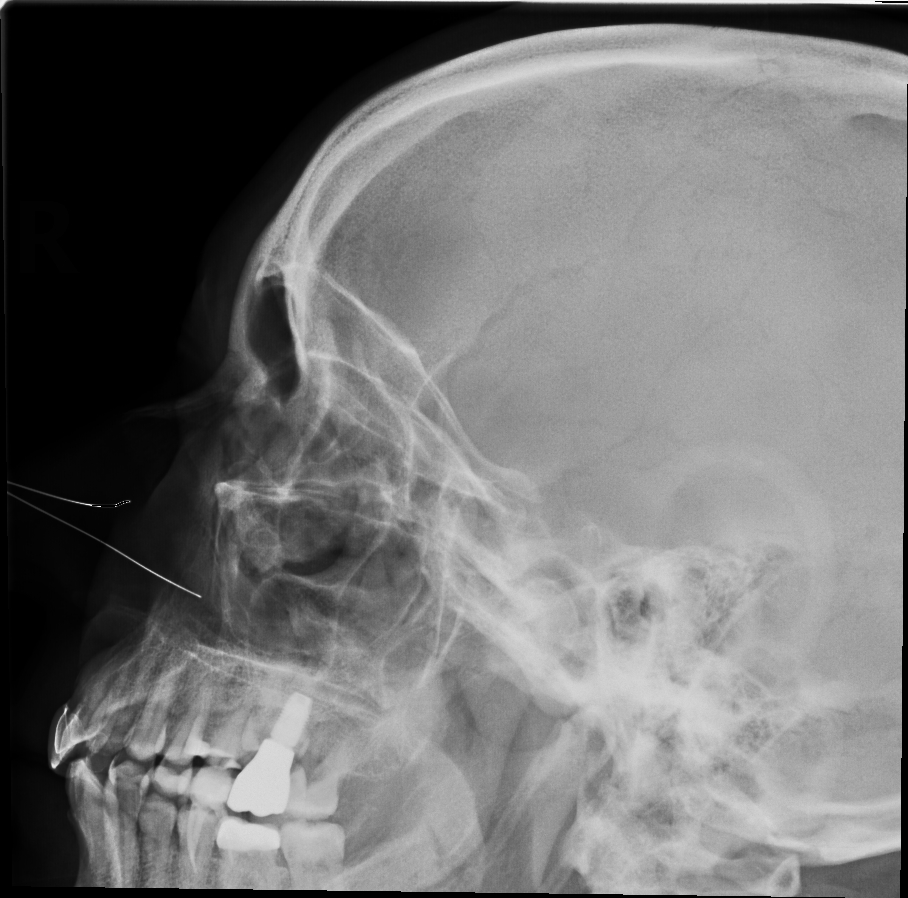
Paranasal sinuses radiograph (lateral)

3D cast of maxillary, frontal, ethmoid and sphenoid sinuses, nasal cavity and hypopharynx

== Clinical significance ==
=== Inflammation ===
The paranasal sinuses are joined to the nasal cavity via small orifices called ostia. These can be blocked in various situations. In addition to anatomical variants, swelling of the nasal mucosa is the major factor of such a blocking. This is most commonly caused by local inflammation in the context of allergic rhinitis. The blockage of the ostia leads to mucus accumulation in the sinus, and eventually chronic sinusitis.

Another cause of sinusitis (literally "inflammation of the sinuses") is the maxillary posterior teeth roots, located near the maxillary sinus. An infection of a tooth can thus cause acute or chronic so-called odontogenic sinusitis.

Infectious sinusitis (caused by germs) usually requires antibiotic treatment. Other causes are mainly treated with nasal decongestants, which cause vasoconstriction of the mucosal vessels, and with corticosteroids, which decrease inflammation. In some cases, surgical treatment may be indicated, to broaden the ostia and allow proper drainage of the sinuses' content.

=== Cancer ===
Malignancies of the paranasal sinuses comprise approximately 0.2% of all malignancies. About 80% of these malignancies arise in the maxillary sinus. Men are much more often affected than women. They most often occur in the age group between 40 and 70 years. Carcinomas are more frequent than sarcomas. Metastases are rare. Tumours of the sphenoid and frontal sinuses are extremely rare.

== Etymology ==
Sinus is a Latin word meaning a fold, curve, or bay. Compare sine.

== Animals ==
Paranasal sinuses occur in many animals, including most mammals, birds, and crocodilians. They have also been discovered in non-avian dinosaurs. The bones occupied by sinuses vary with species.

== Illustrations ==
Paranasal sinuses

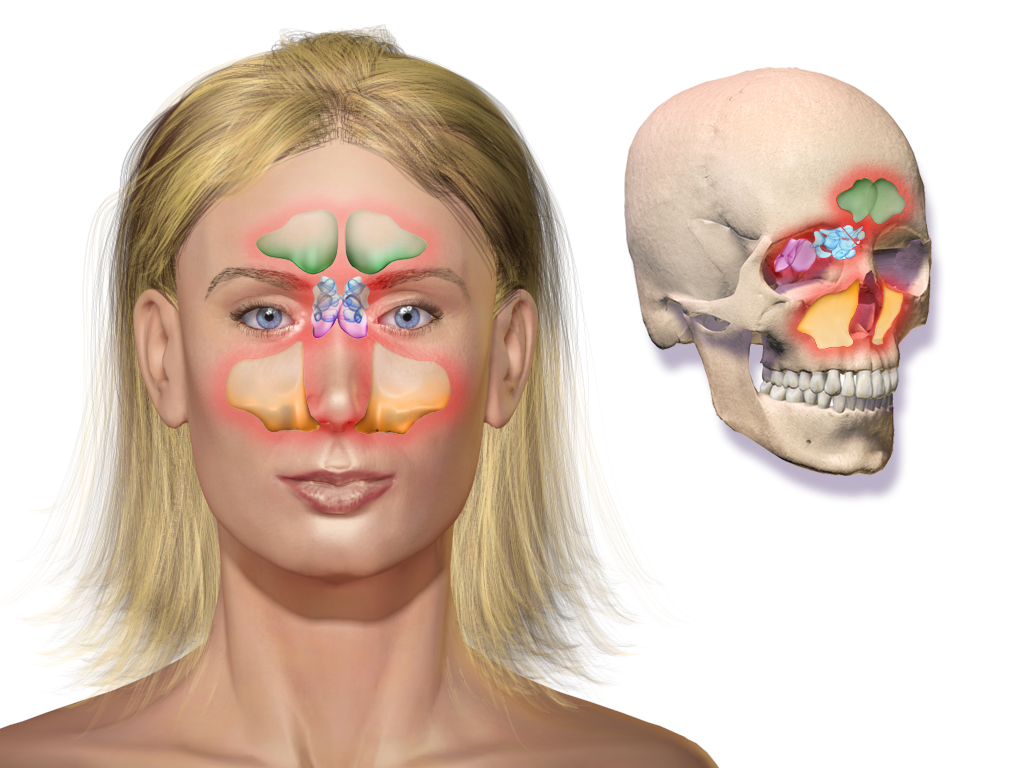
Illustration depicting sinusitis
