= Nasal concha =

Piece of bone in the breathing passage of humans and other animals

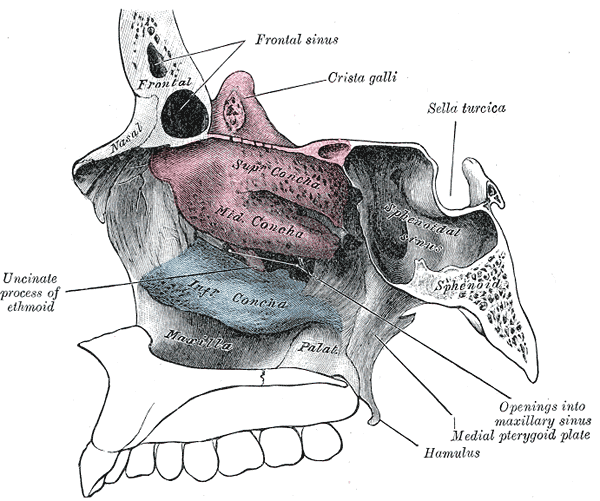
- Lateral wall of nasal cavity, showing ethmoid bone in position (superior and middle in pink, and inferior in blue)

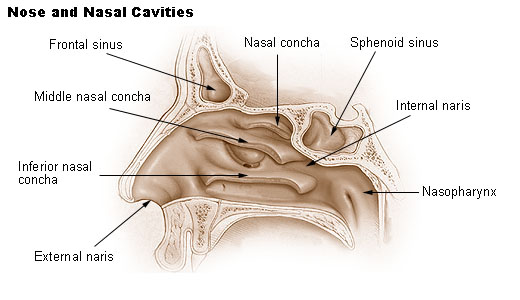

Details

Identifiers
- Latin: concha nasale
- MeSH: D014420
- FMA: 57456

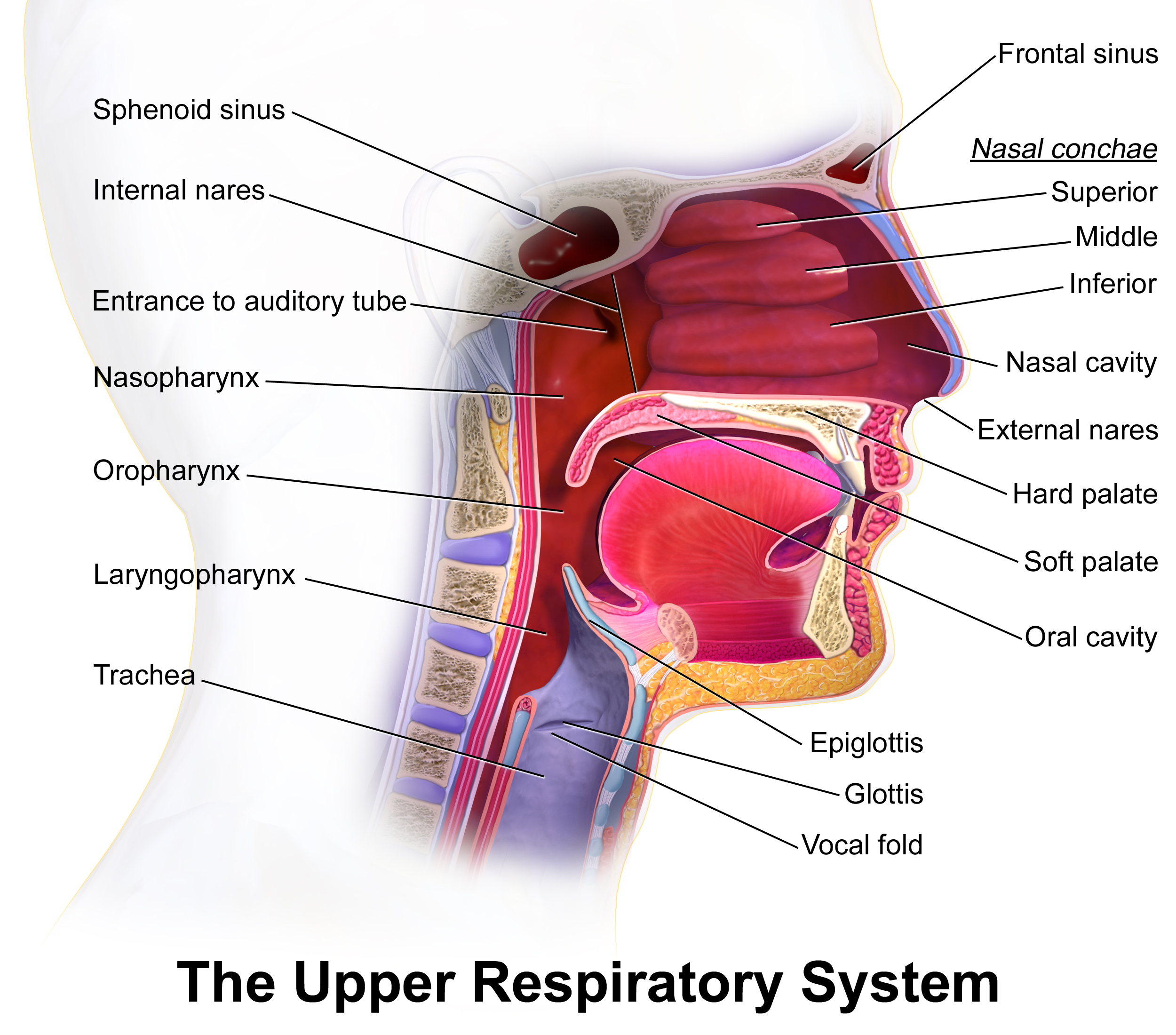
Illustration of upper respiratory system

A nasal concha (/ˈkɒnkə/; pl.: conchae; /ˈkɒnkiː/; Latin for 'shell') is a long, narrow, curled shelf of bone that protrudes into the breathing passage of the nose in humans and various other animals. The conchae are shaped like an elongated seashell, which gave them their name (Latin concha from Greek κόγχη). A concha is any of the scrolled spongy bones of the nasal passages in vertebrates. The term concha refers to the actual bone; when covered by soft tissue and mucosa, and functioning, a concha is termed a turbinate.

In the human nose, the nasal conchae divide the nasal airway into four groove-like air passages and play a major role in conditioning inspired air by increasing surface area to warm, humidify, and filter the air before it reaches the lungs. As a ciliated mucous membrane with shallow blood supply, the nasal mucosa cleans, humidifies and warms the inhaled air in preparation for the lungs.

A rapidly dilating arteriolar circulation to these bones may lead to a sharp increase in the pressure within, in response to acute cooling of the body core. The pain from this pressure is often referred to as "brain freeze", and is frequently associated with the rapid consumption of ice cream. The shallowness of the venous blood supply of the mucosa contributes to the ease with which nosebleed can occur.

== Structure ==
Conchae are lined by pseudostratified columnar, ciliated respiratory epithelium with a thick, vascular, and erectile glandular tissue layer. The conchae are located laterally in the nasal cavities, curling medially and downward into the nasal airway. Each nasal concha is paired (one on each side of the nasal cavity), and humans typically have three pairs—inferior, middle, and superior—with a fourth pair (supreme concha) present in some individuals.

The superior conchae are smaller structures, connected to the middle conchae by nerve-endings, and serve to protect the olfactory bulb. The superior conchae are part of the ethmoid bone, like the middle conchae. The openings to the posterior ethmoidal sinuses exist under the superior meatus. The sphenoid sinus ostium exists medial to the superior turbinate.

The middle conchae are smaller but have the most complex anatomy of the nasal turbinates. They originate from the lateral edge of the cribriform plate of the ethmoid bone. They insert anteriorly into the frontal process of the maxilla and posteriorly into the perpendicular plate of the palatine bone. There are three mutually perpendicular segments of the middle turbinate: from proximal to distal, there is the horizontal segment (axial plane), the basal lamella or also known as the ground lamella (coronal plane), and the vertical segment (sagittal plane). They project downwards over the openings of the maxillary and anterior and middle ethmoid sinuses, and act as buffers to protect the sinuses from coming in direct contact with pressurized nasal airflow. Most inhaled airflow travels between the inferior concha and the middle meatus. In humans, they are usually as long as the little finger.

The inferior conchae are the largest turbinates, can be as long as the index finger in humans, and are responsible for the majority of airflow direction, humidification, heating, and filtering of air inhaled through the nose. The superior and middle nasal conchae are part of the ethmoid bone, while the inferior nasal concha is a separate bone.

The inferior conchae are graded 1–4 based on the inferior concha classification system (known as the inferior turbinate classification system) in which the total amount of the airway space that the inferior concha takes up is estimated. Grade 1 is 0–25% of the airway, grade 2 is 26–50% of the airway, grade 3 is 51–75% of the airway and grade 4 is 76–100% of the airway.

There is sometimes a pair of supreme conchae superior to the superior conchae. When present, these usually take the form of a small crest.

== Function ==
The turbinates comprise most of the mucosal tissue of the nose and are required for functional respiration. They are enriched with airflow pressure and temperature-sensing nerve receptors (linked to the trigeminal nerve route, the fifth cranial nerve), allowing for tremendous erectile capabilities of nasal congestion and decongestion, in response to the weather conditions and changing needs of the body. In addition, the erectile tissue undergoes an often unnoticed cycle of partial congestion and decongestion called the nasal cycle. The flow of blood to the nasal mucosa in particular the venous plexus of the conchae is regulated by the pterygopalatine ganglion and heats or cools the air in the nose.

The nasopulmonary and nasothoracic reflexes regulate the mechanism of breathing through deepening of inhalation. Triggered by the flow of the air, the pressure of the air in the nose, and the quality of the air, impulses from the nasal mucosa are transmitted by the trigeminal nerve to the breathing centres in the brainstem, and the generated response is transmitted to the bronchi, the intercostal muscles, and the diaphragm.

The turbinates are also responsible for filtration, heating, and humidification of air inhaled through the nose. Of these three, filtration is achieved mostly by other more effective means such as mucus and cilia. The respiratory mucosa covering the conchae contains cilia and a rich vascular network that helps filter particles and adjust the temperature and humidity of inspired air. As air passes over the conchae, it is heated to 32–34 °C (89–93 °F), humidified (up to 98% water saturation) and filtered.

The nasal conchae are also involved in the nasal cycle, a normal physiological alternation of congestion and decongestion that helps regulate airflow through each nostril.

=== Immunological role ===
The respiratory epithelium that covers the erectile tissue (or lamina propria) of the conchae plays a major role in the body's first line of immunological defense. The respiratory epithelium is partially composed of mucus-producing goblet cells. This secreted mucus covers the nasal cavities, and serves as a filter, by trapping air-borne particles larger than 2 to 3 micrometers. The respiratory epithelium also serves as a means of access for the lymphatic system, which protects the body from being infected by viruses or bacteria.

=== Smell ===
The conchae provide, first and foremost, the humidity needed to preserve the delicate olfactory epithelium, which in turn is needed to keep the olfactory receptors healthy and alert. If the epithelial layer gets dry or irritated, it may cease to function. This is usually a temporary condition but, over time, may lead to chronic anosmia. The turbinates also increase the surface area of the inside of the nose, and, by directing and deflecting airflow across the maximum mucosal surface of the inner nose, they are able to propel the inspired air. This, coupled with the humidity and filtration provided by the conchae, helps to carry more scent molecules towards the higher, and very narrow regions of the nasal airways, where olfaction nerve receptors are located.

The superior conchae completely cover and protect the nerve axons piercing through the cribriform plate (a porous bone plate that separates the nose from the brain) into the nose. Some areas of the middle conchae are also innervated by the olfactory bulb. All three pairs of conchae are innervated by pain and temperature receptors, via the trigeminal nerve (or, the fifth cranial nerve). Research has shown that there is a strong connection between these nerve endings and activation of the olfactory receptors, but science has yet to fully explain this interaction.

== Clinical significance ==
=== Dysfunction ===
Enlargement of the nasal conchae (turbinate hypertrophy) may lead to nasal airway obstruction; this can result from allergies, inflammation, or environmental irritants and sometimes requires medical or surgical management. Allergies, exposure to environmental irritants, or a persistent inflammation within the sinuses can lead to turbinate swelling. Deformity of the nasal septum can also result in enlarged turbinates.

Treatment of the underlying allergy or irritant may reduce turbinate swelling. In cases that do not resolve, or for treatment of deviated septum, turbinate surgery may be required.

=== Surgery ===
Turbinate reduction is a surgery to reduce the size of the turbinates (typically inferior turbinates). There are different techniques, including bipolar radiofrequency ablation (also known as somnoplasty), electrocautery, and use of cold steel instruments (e.g. microdebrider).

In the case of turbinate reduction, only small amounts of turbinate tissue are removed because the turbinates are essential for respiration. Turbinectomy is usually reserved for patients who have persistent symptoms despite previous turbinate reduction surgery. Risks of reduction of the inferior or middle turbinates include empty nose syndrome. As Steven M. Houser suggested, "this is especially true in cases of anterior inferior turbinate (IT) resection because of its important role in the internal nasal valve."

Concha bullosa is an abnormal pneumatization of the middle turbinate, which may interfere with normal ventilation of the sinus ostia and can result in recurrent sinusitis. In some cases, the concha bullosa may be resected to help resolve persistent symptoms.

== Other animals ==
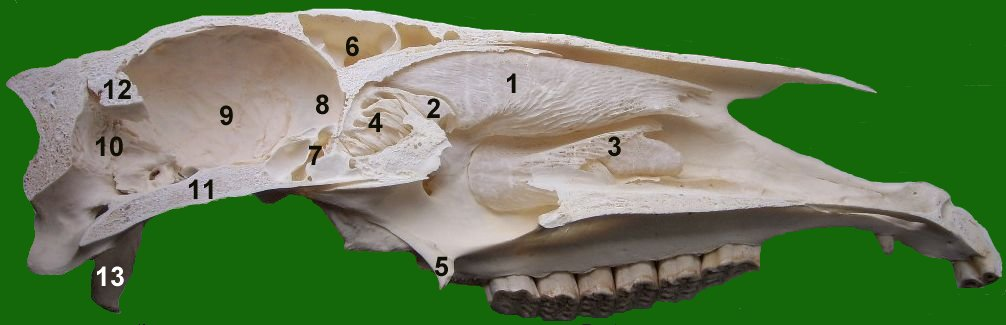
The horse breathes through nares (nostrils) which expand during exercise. The nasal passages have two turbinates on either side which increase the surface area to which air is exposed. 1 : Concha nasalis dorsalis 2 : Concha nasalis media 3 : Concha nasalis ventralis

Generally nasal conchae are convoluted structures of thin bone or cartilage located in the nasal cavity. These are lined with mucous membranes that can perform two functions. They can improve the sense of smell by increasing the area available to absorb airborne chemicals, and they can warm and moisten inhaled air, and extract heat and moisture from exhaled air to prevent desiccation of the lungs. Olfactory turbinates are found in all living tetrapods, and respiratory turbinates are found in most mammals and birds.

Animals with respiratory turbinates can breathe faster without drying out their lungs, and consequently can have a faster metabolism. For example, when the emu exhales, its nasal turbinates condense moisture from the air and absorb it for reuse. Dogs and other canids possess well-developed nasal turbinates. These turbinates allow for heat exchange between small arteries and veins on their maxilloturbinate (turbinates positioned on maxilla bone) surfaces in a counter-current heat-exchange system. Dogs are capable of prolonged chases, in contrast to the ambush predation of cats, and these complex turbinates play an important role in enabling this (cats only possess a much smaller and less-developed set of nasal turbinates). This same complex turbinate structure help conserve water in arid environments. The water conservation and thermoregulatory capabilities of these well-developed turbinates in dogs may have been crucial adaptations that allowed dogs (including both domestic dogs and their wild prehistoric gray wolf ancestors) to survive in the harsh Arctic environment and other cold areas of northern Eurasia and North America, which are both very dry and very cold.

Reptiles and more primitive synapsids have olfactory turbinates that are involved in sensing smell rather than preventing desiccation. While the maxilloturbinates of mammals are located in the path of airflow to collect moisture, sensory turbinates in both mammals and reptiles are positioned farther back and above the nasal passage, away from the flow of air. Glanosuchus has ridges positioned low in the nasal cavity, indicating that it had maxilloturbinates that were in the direct path of airflow. The maxilloturbinates may not have been preserved because they were either very thin or cartilaginous. The possibility has also been raised that these ridges are associated with an olfactory epithelium rather than turbinates. Nonetheless, the possible presence of maxilloturbinates suggests that Glanosuchus may have been able to rapidly breathe without drying out the nasal passage, and therefore could have been an endotherm.

The bones of nasal turbinates are very fragile and seldom survive as fossils. In particular none have been found in fossil birds. But there is indirect evidence for their presence in some fossils. Rudimentary ridges like those that support respiratory turbinates have been found in advanced Triassic cynodonts, such as Thrinaxodon and Diademodon. This suggests that they may have had fairly high metabolic rates. The paleontologist John Ruben and others have argued that no evidence of nasal turbinates has been found in dinosaurs. All the dinosaurs they examined had nasal passages that they claimed were too narrow and too short to accommodate nasal turbinates, so dinosaurs could not have sustained the breathing rate required for a mammal-like or bird-like metabolic rate while at rest, because their lungs would have dried out. However, objections have been raised against this argument. Nasal turbinates are absent or very small in some birds, such as ratites, Procellariiformes and Falconiformes. They are also absent or very small in some mammals, such as anteaters, bats, elephants, whales and most primates, although these animals are fully endothermic and in some cases very active. Furthermore, ossified turbinate bones have been identified in the ankylosaurid dinosaur Saichania.

== Additional images ==
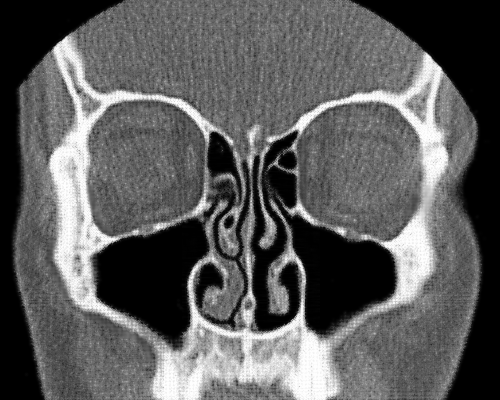
Nasal conchae: Blocked/free

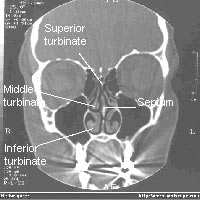
Normal nose CT Front cross section

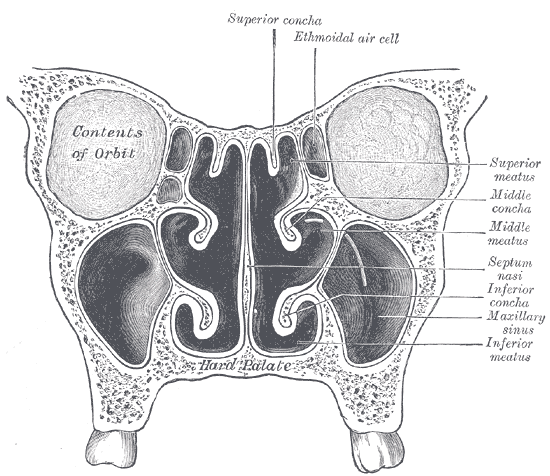
Coronal section of nasal cavities

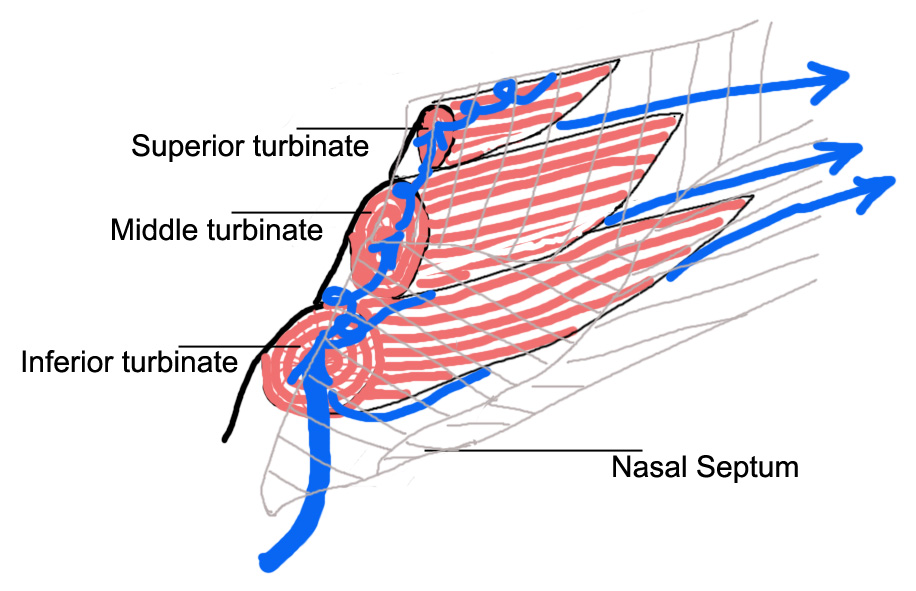
Right nasal airway passage

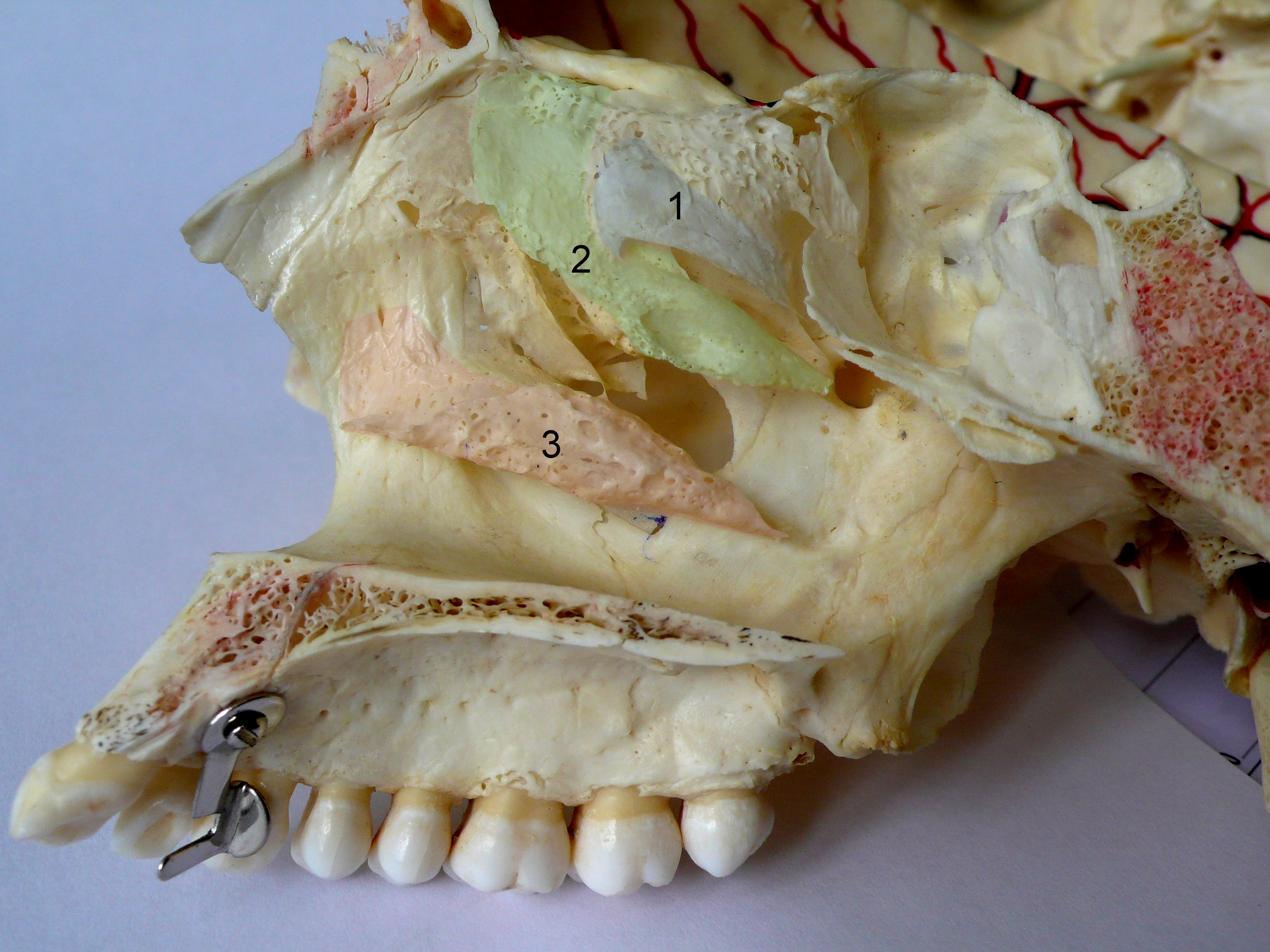
Nasal conchae

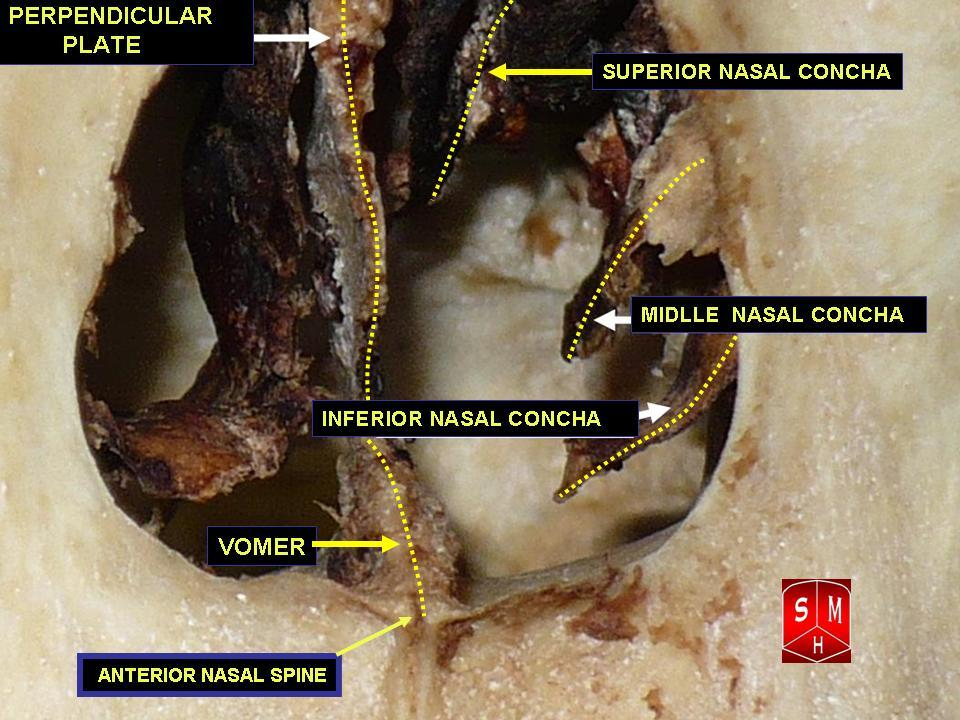
Nasal concha
