= Enophthalmos =

Sinking of the eyeball into its socket

- Specialty: Ophthalmology

Enophthalmos is a posterior displacement of the eyeball within the orbit. It is due to either enlargement of the bony orbit and/or reduction of the orbital content, this in relation to each other.

It should not be confused with its opposite, exophthalmos, which is the anterior displacement of the eye.

It may be a congenital anomaly, or be acquired as a result of trauma (such as in a blowout fracture of the orbit), Horner's syndrome (apparent enophthalmos due to ptosis), Marfan syndrome, Duane's syndrome, silent sinus syndrome or phthisis bulbi.
