= Frontal sinus =

Airspace below ridge of eyebrow in humam anatomy

- Outline of bones of face, showing position of air sinuses. Frontal sinus is shown in green.

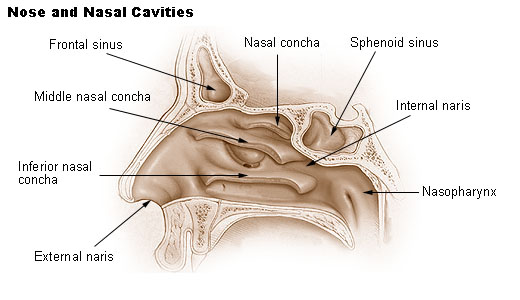
- Nose and nasal cavities

Details
- Artery: Supra-orbital, anterior ethmoidal
- Nerve: Supraorbital nerve

Identifiers
- Latin: sinus frontales
- MeSH: D005626
- TA98: A06.1.03.004
- TA2: 3179
- FMA: 57417

The frontal sinuses are one of the four pairs of paranasal sinuses that are situated behind the brow ridges. Sinuses are mucosa-lined airspaces within the bones of the face and skull. Each opens into the anterior part of the corresponding middle nasal meatus of the nose through the frontonasal duct which traverses the anterior part of the labyrinth of the ethmoid. These structures then open into the semilunar hiatus in the middle meatus.

== Structure ==
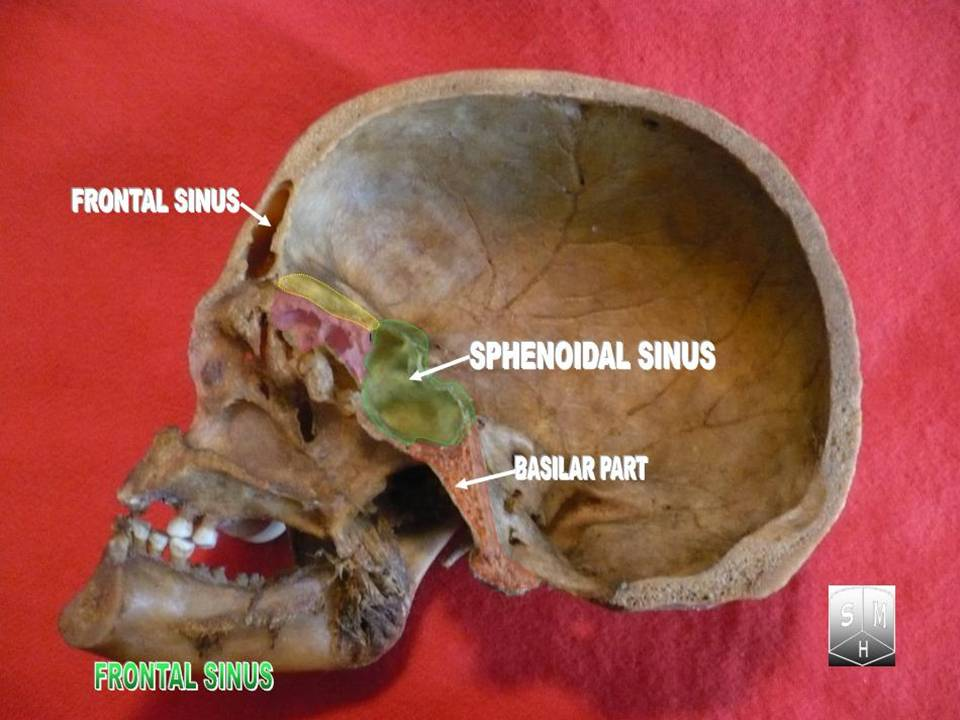
Frontal sinus

Each frontal sinus is situated between the external and internal plates of the frontal bone. Their average measurements are as follows: height 28 mm, breadth 24 mm, depth 20 mm, creating a space of 6–7 ml.

Each frontal sinus extends into the squamous part of the frontal bone superiorly, and into the orbital part of frontal bone posteriorly to come to occupy the medial part of the roof of the orbit.

Each sinus drains through an opening in its inferomedial part into the frontonasal duct.

=== Vasculature ===
The mucous membrane of the frontal sinus receives arterial supply from the supraorbital artery, and anterior ethmoidal artery.

Venous drainage is provided by the superior ophthalmic vein.

Lymph is drained into the submandibular lymph nodes.

=== Innervation ===
The mucous membrane of the sinus is innervated by the supraorbital nerve, which contains the postganglionic parasympathetic nerve fibers for mucous secretion from the ophthalmic nerve.

=== Anatomical variation ===
Frontal sinuses are rarely symmetrical as the septum between them frequently deviates to either side of the midline. The two sinuses also vary in extent compared to one another.

The size of the frontal sinuses is highly variable. Rarely, one or both sinuses is hypoplastic or even absent.

==== Sexual dimorphism ====
Prominence of frontal sinuses is sexual dimorphic; they are more prominent in males, whereas less so in children and in females, resulting in an oblique forehead in males that is a male sexual characteristic.

=== Development ===
The frontal sinuses are the only sinuses that are absent at birth. They begin to appear during the second year of life as excavations in the diploë. The development of these sinuses accounts for the suddenly increased mucus production at this age. They are generally well developed, and functional between the sixth and eighth years, though they continue to grow slower until reaching their maximum size after puberty.

== Function ==
Through its copious mucus production, the sinus is an essential part of the immune defense/air filtration carried out by the nose. Nasal and sinal mucosae are ciliated and move mucus to the choanae and finally to the stomach. The thick upper layers of nasal mucus trap bacteria and small particles in tissue abundantly provided with immune cells, antibodies, and antibacterial proteins. The layers beneath are thinner and provide a substrate in which the cilia are able to beat and move the upper layer with its debris through the ostia toward the choanae.

== Clinical significance ==
Infection of the frontal sinus causing sinusitis can give rise to serious complications, as it is in close proximity to the orbit and cranial cavity (orbital cellulitis, epidural and subdural abscess, meningitis). Endonasal approach into the frontal sinus in children with acute and chronic frontal sinusitis without the usage of surgical optics is not successful, because in this case the operation is performed almost blindly and technically difficult even in adults. Frontal sinus trephination has also been used as a more direct approach to drainage.

=== Fractures ===
Frontal sinus fractures occur from trauma to the part of the frontal bone that overlies the sinus, often from motor vehicle accidents and falls. The hallmarks of a frontal sinus fracture is a frontal depression in the anterior table of the bone. Additionally, clear fluid leaking from the nose may indicate that fractures to the posterior table have torn into the dura mater, creating a cerebrospinal fluid leak.

Goals in management are to protect the intracranial structure, control any existing CSF leakage, prevent late complications, and aesthetically correct the deformity caused, if any. In anterior table fractures, if the table is minimally displaced, there will be no treatment necessary, only observation. If largely displaced, the correction is open reduction and internal fixation. If inhibiting the nasofrontal outflow tract, procedure is to undergo open reduction and internal fixation of the anterior table and osteoplastic flap with obliteration.

In posterior table fractures, a non-displaced fracture with no CSF leak will only be observed. Those with a CSF leak will undergo sinus exploration if the CSF leak is not internally resolved within 4 to 7 days. With more dramatic displacements, sinus exploration will be required to determine the required level of cranialization, obliteration, and reparation to the dura.

=== Aesthetic reconstruction ===
In the case of facial feminization surgery, modifications to the frontal sinus can be made to make the face more feminine, alongside softening the orbital rims. The forehead operations for feminization were first described by Dr. Douglas Ousterhout in the 1980s. Those operations consisted of four different techniques based on the anatomy of the patient. They were named arbitrarily by number (Type 1, Type 2, Type 3 and Type 4), with no particular relevance to their level of difficulty or frequency.

- Type 1

The Type I forehead describes a forehead with an absent frontal sinus or alternatively with sufficiently thick bone overlaying the frontal sinus so that burring alone is enough to correct the forehead. This type of forehead tends to occur in approximately 3–5% of the population. In these situations, the operation consists of using rotary instruments to shape and contour the bone to the desired level, while observing the thickness of the bone to avoid penetrating the intracranial space. The main risks associated with this operation tend to be bleeding. There are often venous lakes present throughout the frontal bone.

- Type 2

The Type II forehead describes another uncommon situation. This describes a patient with brow bossing; however, the bossing is at the correction position in terms of prominence. Therefore, the problem lies primarily above the bossing. We see this forehead type at about the same frequency as we see the Type I forehead. The Type II forehead is corrected by using a filling material such as methyl methacrylate.7 Other materials may be more ideal at this point; however, none are superior in terms of cost to methyl methacrylate. Although many surgeons do not consider the cost of the materials they are using, hydroxyapatite and calcium phos-phate bone cements cost approximately 1000 times that of methyl methacrylate. The advantage of bone cement is its adherence to the underlying bone, and the more analogous nature to native bone substrate. The material is applied to fill in the area above the bossing, and then gently contoured to blend with the transverse forehead bossing thereby-creating a uniformly round forehead

- Type 3

The Type III forehead is the most common situation and occurs in more than 90% of patients. The forehead, in this situation, has a prominent bossing across the top of the brows, and that bossing is overly projected. A frontal sinus is present. The thinness of the sinus precludes using exclusively rotary instruments to thin the bone. An osteotomy and reconstruction are the only operations to provide the proper round shape to the forehead with the decreased prominence that is necessary for a soft forehead, which involves a setback of the anterior table of the frontal sinus. This procedure is described as Type 3 Forehead Cranioplasty.

- Type 4

This operation can be described as an extended Type II operation. In this situation, the entire forehead is diminutive, including the area underlying the brows, and the entire forehead requires augmentation. Regardless of the material type, care should be taken to avoid having the implant sit directly underneath the incision as this leads to a higher rate of infection and removal.

Treatment of the orbital rim is almost always necessary in all these various forehead operations, regardless of what is done with the frontal bossing.
