= Middle nasal concha =

Section of the ethmoid bone

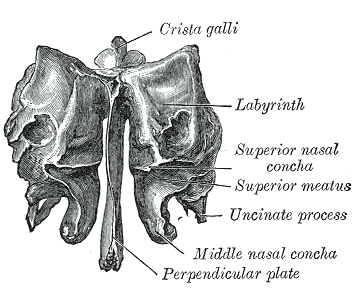
- Ethmoid bone from behind

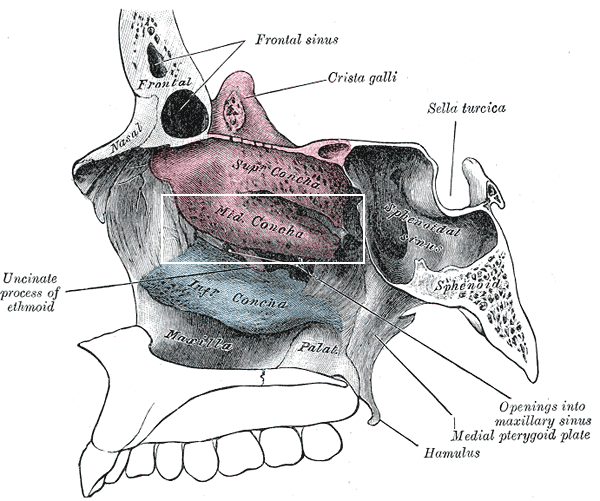
- Lateral wall of nasal cavity, showing ethmoid bone in position. (Middle nasal concha is at bottom of pink region.)

Details

Identifiers
- Latin: concha nasi media, concha nasalis media
- TA98: A06.1.02.014; A02.1.07.014
- TA2: 735
- FMA: 57459

The medial surface of the labyrinth of ethmoid consists of a thin lamella, which descends from the under surface of the cribriform plate, and ends below in a free, convoluted margin, the middle nasal concha.

The middle concha is rough, and marked above by numerous grooves, directed nearly vertically downward from the cribriform plate; they lodge branches of the olfactory nerves, which are distributed to the mucous membrane covering the superior nasal concha.

It inserts anteriorly into the frontal process of the maxilla and posteriorly into the perpendicular plate of the palatine bone. There are three mutually perpendicular segments of the middle concha: from proximal to distal, there is the horizontal segment (axial plane), the basal lamella (coronal plane), and the vertical segment (sagittal plane).

== Additional images ==
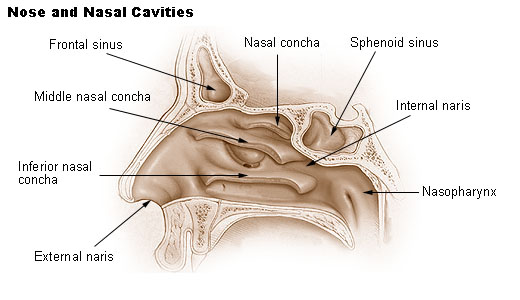
Nose and nasal cavities

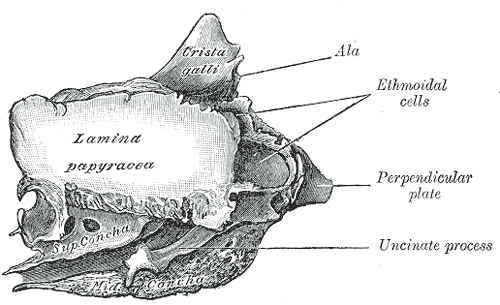
Ethmoid bone from the right side

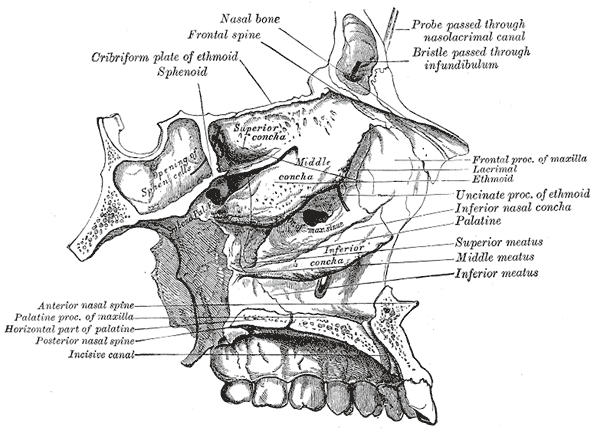
Roof, floor, and lateral wall of left nasal cavity

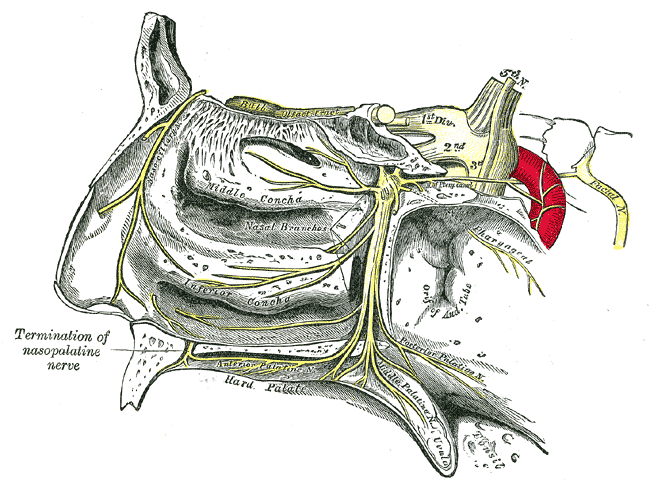
The sphenopalatine ganglion and its branches

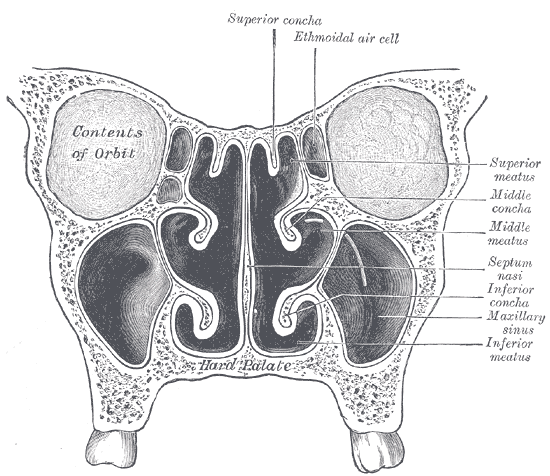
Coronal section of nasal cavities

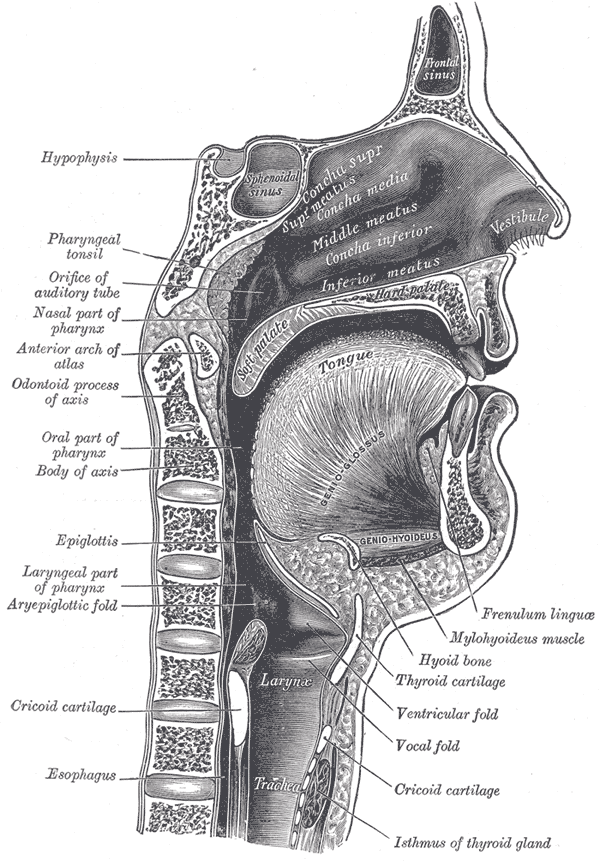
Sagittal section of nose, mouth, pharynx, and larynx

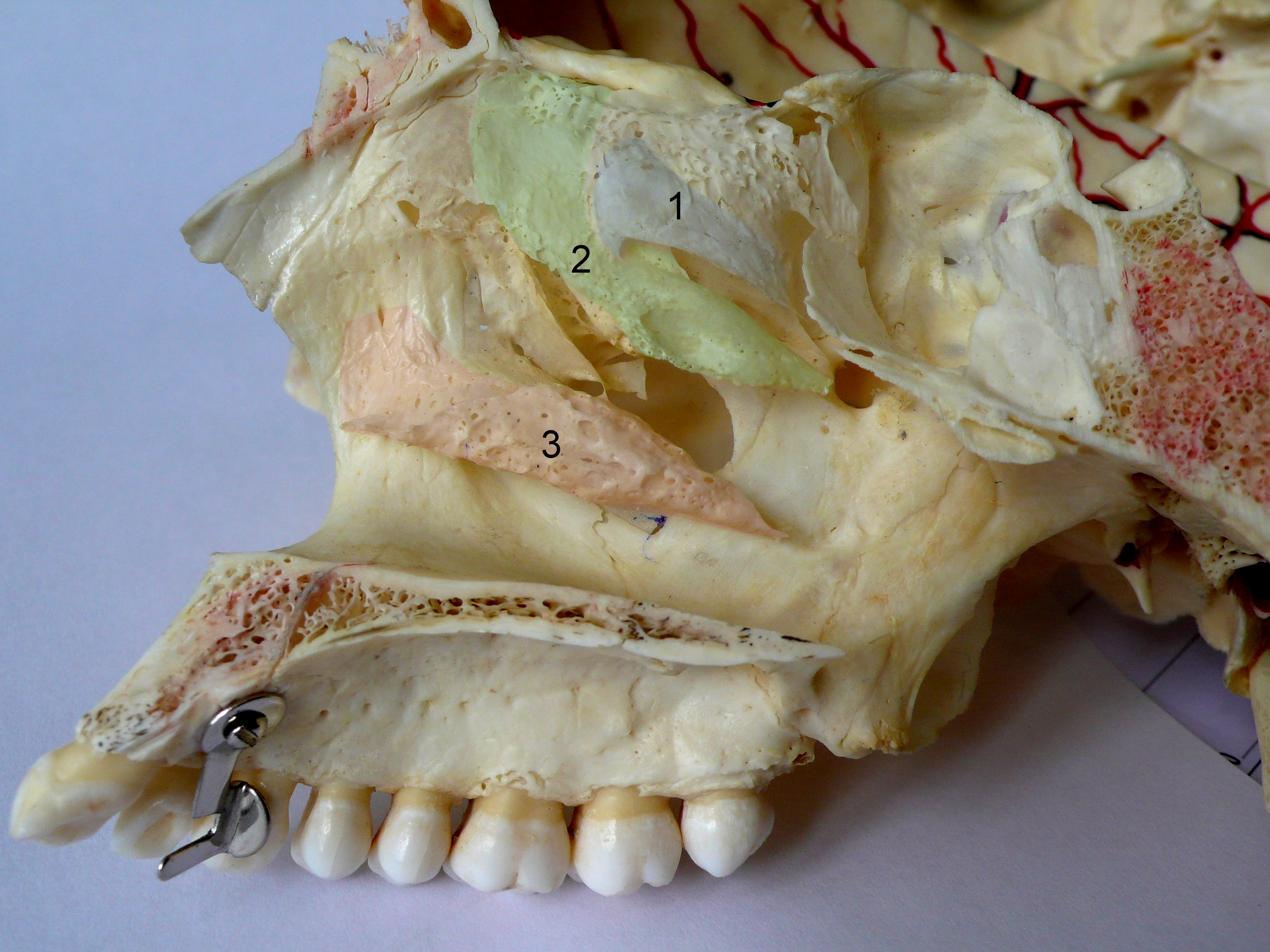
Nasal conchae

== See also ==
- Nasal concha
