= Ethmoid sinus =

Air-filled space near the nasal cavity

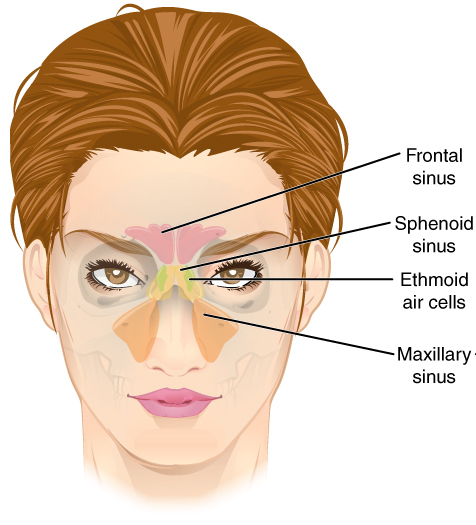
- Frontal view of paranasal sinuses

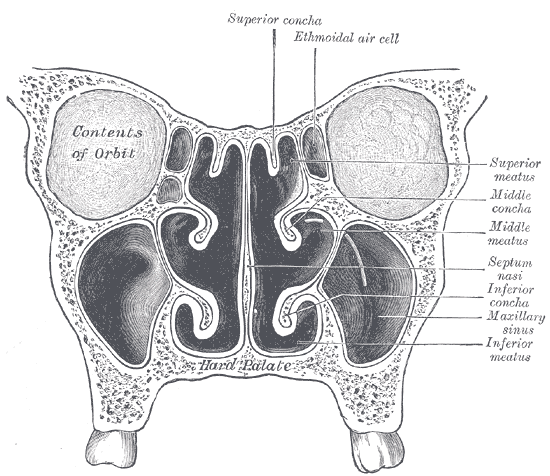
- Coronal section of nasal cavities.

Details
- Nerve: Posterior ethmoidal nerve

Identifiers
- Latin: cellulae ethmoidales, labyrinthi ethmoidales
- MeSH: D005005
- TA98: A06.1.03.005
- TA2: 3180
- FMA: 84115

The ethmoid sinuses or ethmoid air cells of the ethmoid bone are one of the four paired paranasal sinuses. Unlike the other three pairs of paranasal sinuses which consist of one or two large cavities, the ethmoidal sinuses entail a number of small air-filled cavities ("air cells"). The cells are located within the lateral mass (labyrinth) of each ethmoid bone and are variable in both size and number. The cells are grouped into anterior, middle, and posterior groups; the groups differ in their drainage modalities, though all ultimately drain into either the superior or the middle nasal meatus of the lateral wall of the nasal cavity.

== Structure ==
The ethmoid air cells consist of numerous thin-walled cavities in the ethmoidal labyrinth that represent invaginations of the mucous membrane of the nasal wall into the ethmoid bone. They are situated between the superior parts of the nasal cavities and the orbits, and are separated from these cavities by thin bony lamellae.

There are 5-15 air cells in either ethmoid bone in the adult, with a combined volume of 2-3mL.

=== Development ===
The ethmoidal cells (sinuses) and maxillary sinuses are present at birth. At birth, 3-4 air cells are present, with the number increasing to 5-15 by adulthood.

=== Drainage ===
- The anterior ethmoidal cells drain (directly or indirectly) into the middle nasal meatus by way of the ethmoidal infundibulum.
- The middle ethmoidal cells drain directly into the middle nasal meatus.
- The posterior ethmoidal cells drain directly into the superior nasal meatus at the sphenoethmoidal recess; sometimes, one or more opens into the sphenoidal sinus.

=== Lamellae ===
The ethmoidal labyrinth is divided by multiple obliquely oriented, parallel lamellae. The first lamellae is equivalent to the uncinate process of ethmoid bone, the second corresponds the ethmoid bulla, and the third is the basal lamella, and the fourth is equivalent to the superior nasal concha.

The anterior and posterior ethmoid cells are separated by the basal lamella (also known as the ground lamella). It is one of the bony divisions of the ethmoid bone and is mostly contained inside the ethmoid labyrinth. The basal lamella is continuous medially with the bony middle nasal concha. Anteriorly, it vertically inserts into the ethmoid crest; the middle part attaches obliquely into the orbital lamina of ethmoid bone (lamina papyricea) while the posterior part attaches into the orbital lamina horizontally.

=== Innervation ===
The ethmoidal air cells receive sensory innervation from the anterior and the posterior ethmoidal nerve (which are ultimately derived from the ophthalmic branch (CN V_{1}) of the trigeminal nerve (CN V)), and the orbital branches of the pterygopalatine ganglion, which carry the postganglionic parasympathetic nerve fibers for mucous secretion from the facial nerve.

=== Haller cells ===
Haller cells are air cells situated beneath the ethmoid bulla along the roof of the maxillary sinus and the most inferior portion of the lamina papyracea, including air cells located within the ethmoid infundibulum. These may arise from the anterior or posterior ethmoidal sinuses.

=== Onodi cells ===
Also known as a sphenoethmoidal air cell, an Onodi cell is a posterior ethmoidal air cell that lies superolateral to the sphenoid sinus, often extending into the anterior clinoid process. Onodi cells are clinically significant because they lie in close proximity to the optic nerve and internal carotid artery, so surgeons should be aware of their existence when performing surgery on the sphenoid sinus so as not to damage these important structures.

A central Onodi air cell is a variation in which a posterior ethmoid cell lies superior to the sphenoid sinus in a midline position with at least one optic canal bulge.

== Clinical significance ==
Acute ethmoiditis in childhood and ethmoidal carcinoma may spread superiorly causing meningitis and cerebrospinal fluid leakage or it may spread laterally into the orbit causing proptosis and diplopia.

== Additional images ==
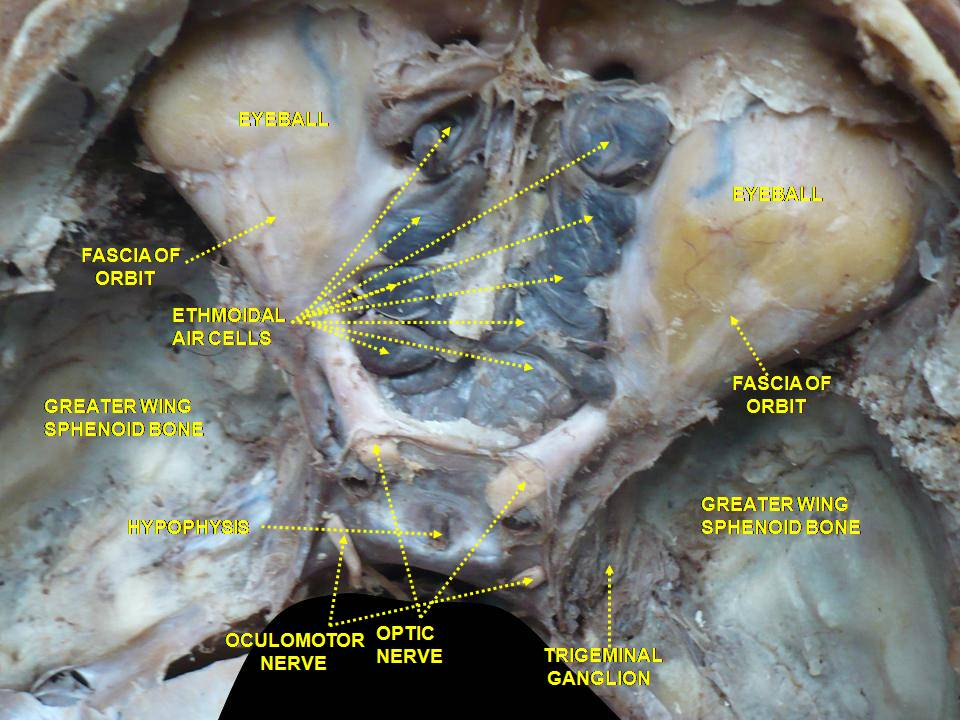
Ethmoid sinus. Ethmoidal air cells. Deep dissection. Superior view.

Ethmoid sinus cancer that has spread to the lymph nodes
