= Uncinate process of ethmoid bone =

Sickle shaped projection in the skull

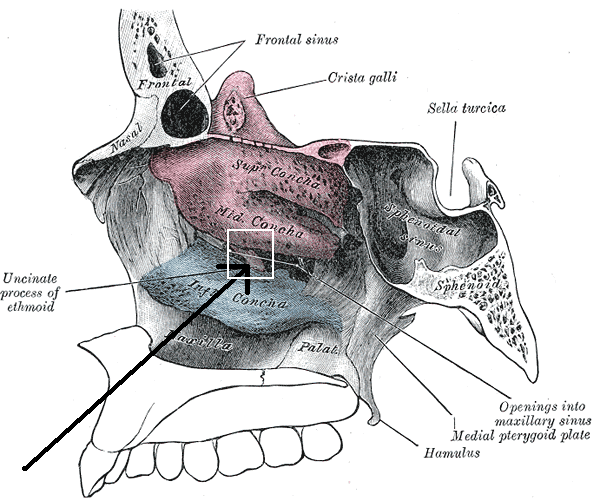
- Uncinate process, labeled at left, on the lateral wall of nasal cavity

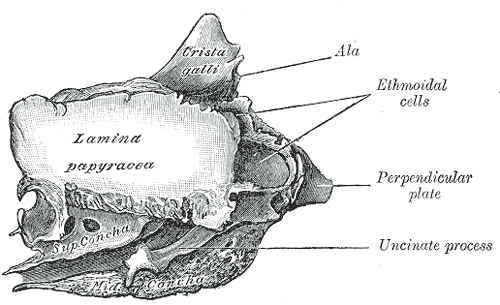
- Uncinate process labeled at bottom right

Details

Identifiers
- Latin: processus uncinatus ossis ethmoidalis
- TA98: A02.1.07.016
- TA2: 737
- FMA: 57455

In the ethmoid bone, a sickle shaped projection, the uncinate process, projects posteroinferiorly from the ethmoid labyrinth. Between the posterior edge of this process and the anterior surface of the ethmoid bulla, there is a two-dimensional space, resembling a crescent shape. This space continues laterally as a three-dimensional slit-like space – the ethmoidal infundibulum. This is bounded by the uncinate process, medially, the orbital lamina of ethmoid bone (lamina papyracea), laterally, and the ethmoidal bulla, posterosuperiorly. This concept is easier to understand if one imagines the infundibulum as a prism so that its medial face is the hiatus semilunaris. The "lateral face" of this infundibulum contains the ostium of the maxillary sinus, which, therefore, opens into the infundibulum.

== Variations ==
The uncinate process can be attached to either the lateral nasal wall, the lamina papyracea (50%), the anterior cranial fossa, on the ethmoidal roof (25%), the middle concha (25%). The superior attachment of the uncinate process determines the drainage pattern of the frontal sinus. In the first case, the infundibulum and the frontal recess are separated from each other, forcing the frontal sinus to drain directly into the middle meatus and not into the ethmoidal infundibulum. With the other configurations, the sinus will drain, firstly, into the infundibulum.
