= S. frontalis =

S. frontalis may refer to:

- Scatophagus frontalis, a fossil fish species
- Sericornis frontalis, the white-browed scrubwren, a passerine bird found in coastal areas of Australia
- Serinus frontalis, the western citril, a species of finch found in Burundi and the Democratic Republic of Congo
- Silvicultrix frontalis, the crowned chat-tyrant, a species of tyrant flycatcher found in Bolivia and Colombia
- Sitta frontalis, the velvet-fronted nuthatch, a small passerine bird found in southern Asia from Pakistan, India and Sri Lanka
- Sporophila frontalis, the Buffy-fronted seedeater, a species of bird found in Argentina and Brazil
- Sporopipes frontalis, the speckle-fronted weaver, a species of bird found in Benin and Burkina Faso
- Stenella frontalis, the Atlantic spotted dolphin, a dolphin found in the Gulf Stream of the North Atlantic Ocean
- Synallaxis frontalis, the sooty-fronted spinetail, a species of bird found in Argentina and Bolivia

== See also ==
- Frontalis (disambiguation)
