= Hilum =

Hilum may refer to:

- Hilum (anatomy), a part of an organ where structures such as blood vessels and nerves enter the body
- Hilum (botany), a scar on a seed or spore created by detachment

== See also ==
- Fovea (disambiguation), another term associated with pits or depressions in anatomy and botany
- Hila (disambiguation)
- Hilum of kidney
- Hilum of lung
- Hilum of lymph node
- Splenic hilum
- Hailam, the Hokkien name for Hainan
