= O. frontalis =

O. frontalis may refer to:

- Ophiusa frontalis, a synonym for Avatha discolor, a moth species
- Orthotomus frontalis, the rufous-fronted tailorbird, an Old World warbler species

== See also ==
- Frontalis (disambiguation)
