= Squamous part =

Squamous part may refer to:

- Squamous part of frontal bone
- Squamous part of temporal bone
- Squamous part of occipital bone
