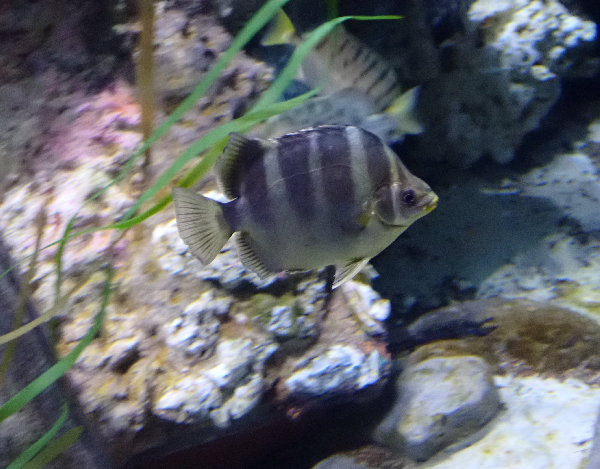

Conservation status
- Least Concern (IUCN 3.1)

Scientific classification
- Kingdom: Animalia
- Phylum: Chordata
- Class: Actinopterygii
- Order: Acanthuriformes
- Family: Scatophagidae
- Genus: Scatophagus
- Species: S. tetracanthus

Binomial name
- Scatophagus tetracanthus (Lacépède, 1802)

Synonyms
- Chaetodon tetracanthus Lacepède, 1802; Cacodoxus tetracanthus (Lacepède, 1802); Ephippus tetracanthus (Lacepède, 1802); Scatophagus fasciatus Cuvier, 1831

= Scatophagus tetracanthus =

Species of fish

Scatophagus tetracanthus, the scatty or African scat is a species of ray-finned fish belonging to the family Scatophagidae, the scats. It is found in eastern Africa and Madagascar and in New Guinea and northern Australia.

== Taxonomy ==
Scatophagus tetracanthus was first formally described Chaetodon tetracanthus as in 1802 by the French naturalist Bernard Germain de Lacépède with no type locality given, Lacépède's description was based on a drawing and manuscript by Philibert Commerson. The specific name is a compound of tetra meaning "four" and acanthus which means "spines", a reference to the four anal fin spines.

== Description ==
Scatophagus tetracanthus has a roughly oval shape, with a rather compact, pointed head ending in a relatively small mouth. The dorsal fin has 11 spines and 15–18 soft rays while the anal fin contains 4 spines and 14–15 soft rays. The soft rayed parts of the dorsal and anal fins are triangular and nearly join with the truncate caudal fin. This species attains a maximum total length of 30 cm (12 in). The background colour of this fish is pale cream marked with thick brown bars, there can be an orange or red patch on the forehead.

== Distribution and habitat ==
Scatophagus tetracanthus is found in the Indo-West Pacific. It is known from eastern Africa from Somalia south to South Africa, it occurs around Madagascar too. It has been reported from the Philippines, Papua New Guinea and Australia. This species lives in harbours and estuaries, as well as in rivers and lagoons.

== Biology ==
Scatophagus tetracanthus feeds on benthic invertebrates and detritus. It lives in shoals as adults. These fish produce venom from a gland in the antirolateral groove.

== Utilisation ==
Scatophagus tetracanthus is rare in the aquarium trade.
