= Orbital part of frontal bone =

Part of the human skull

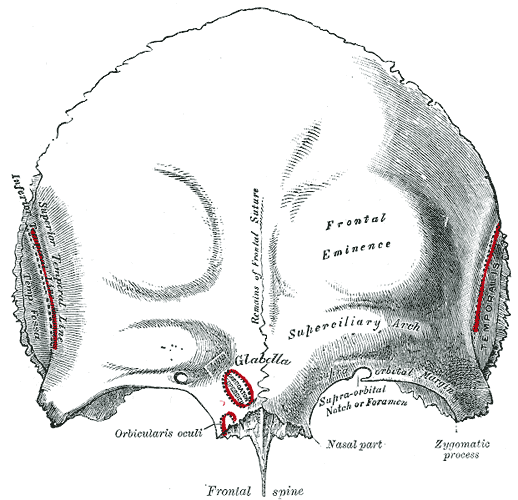
- Frontal bone. Outer surface. (The Pars orbitalis is the bottom third.)

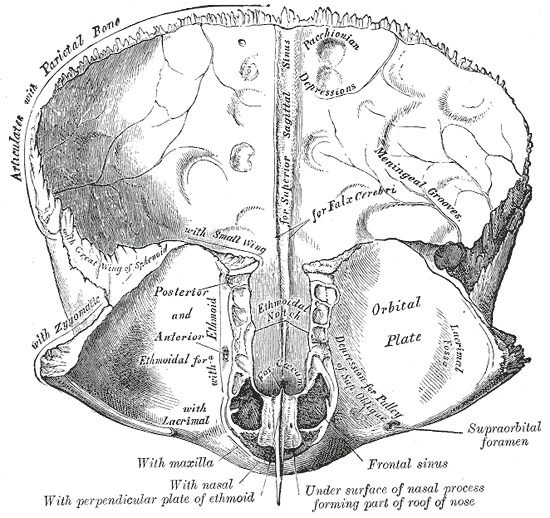
- Frontal bone. Inner surface. (The Pars orbitalis is the bottom third.)

Details

Identifiers
- Latin: pars orbitalis ossis frontalis
- TA98: A02.1.03.022
- TA2: 541
- FMA: 52849

The orbital or horizontal part of the frontal bone (pars orbitalis) consists of two thin triangular plates, the orbital plates, which form the vaults of the orbits, and are separated from one another by a median gap, the ethmoidal notch.

== Surfaces ==
- The inferior surface of each orbital plate is smooth and concave, and presents, laterally, under cover of the zygomatic process, a shallow depression, the lacrimal fossa, for the lacrimal gland; near the nasal part is a depression, the fovea trochlearis, or occasionally a small trochlear spine, for the attachment of the cartilaginous pulley of the obliquus oculi superior.
- The superior surface is convex, and marked by depressions for the convolutions of the frontal lobes of the brain, and faint grooves for the meningeal branches of the ethmoidal vessels.
  - The ethmoidal notch separates the two orbital plates; it is quadrilateral, and filled, in the articulated skull, by the cribriform plate of the ethmoid.
    - The margins of the notch present several half-cells which, when united with corresponding half-cells on the upper surface of the ethmoid, complete the ethmoidal air cells.
  - Two grooves cross these edges transversely; they are converted into the anterior and posterior ethmoidal canals by the ethmoid, and open on the medial wall of the orbit.
    - The anterior canal transmits the nasociliary nerve and anterior ethmoidal vessels,
    - the posterior, the posterior ethmoidal nerve and vessels.
- In front of the ethmoidal notch, on either side of the frontal spine, are the openings of the frontal air sinuses.
  - These are two irregular cavities, which extend backward, upward, and lateralward for a variable distance between the two tables of the skull; they are separated from one another by a thin bony septum, which often deviates to one or other side, with the result that the sinuses are rarely symmetrical.
  - Absent at birth, they are usually fairly well-developed between the seventh and eighth years, but only reach their full size after puberty.
  - They vary in size in different persons, and are larger in men than in women.
  - They are lined by mucous membrane, and each communicates with the corresponding nasal cavity by means of a passage called the frontonasal duct.

== Additional images ==
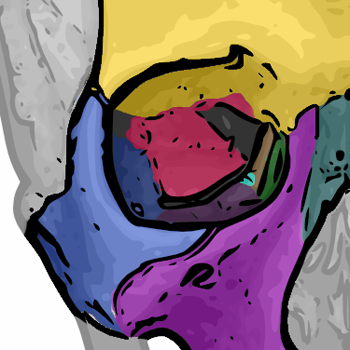
The seven bones which articulate to form the orbit.

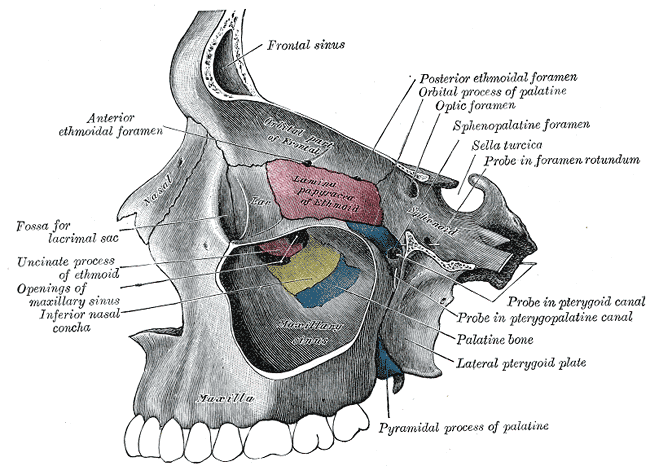
Medial wall of left orbit.

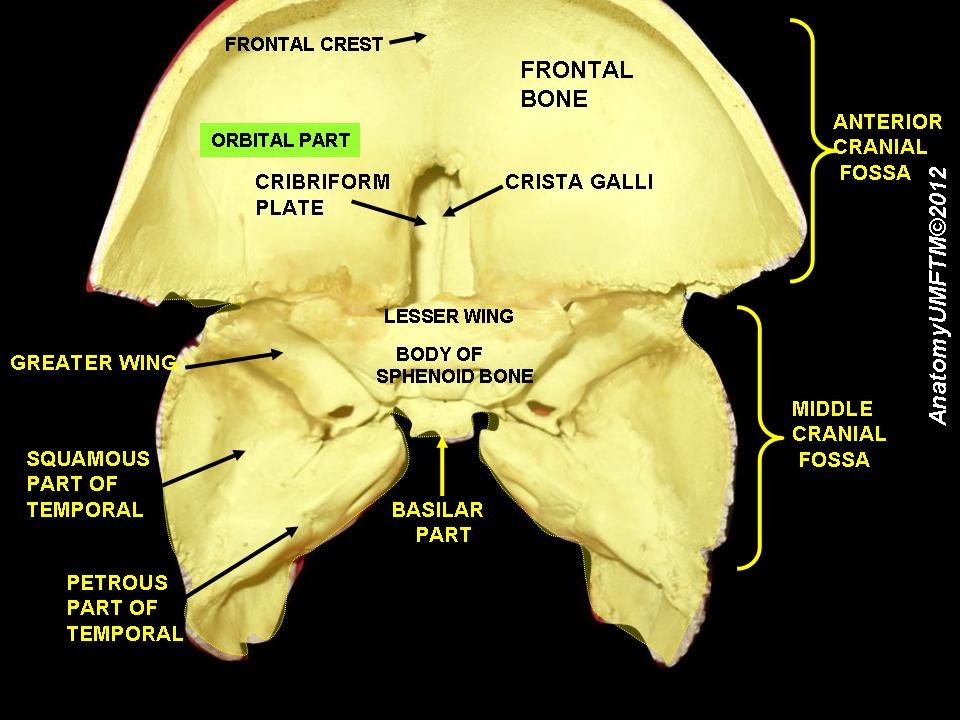
Orbital part of frontal bone

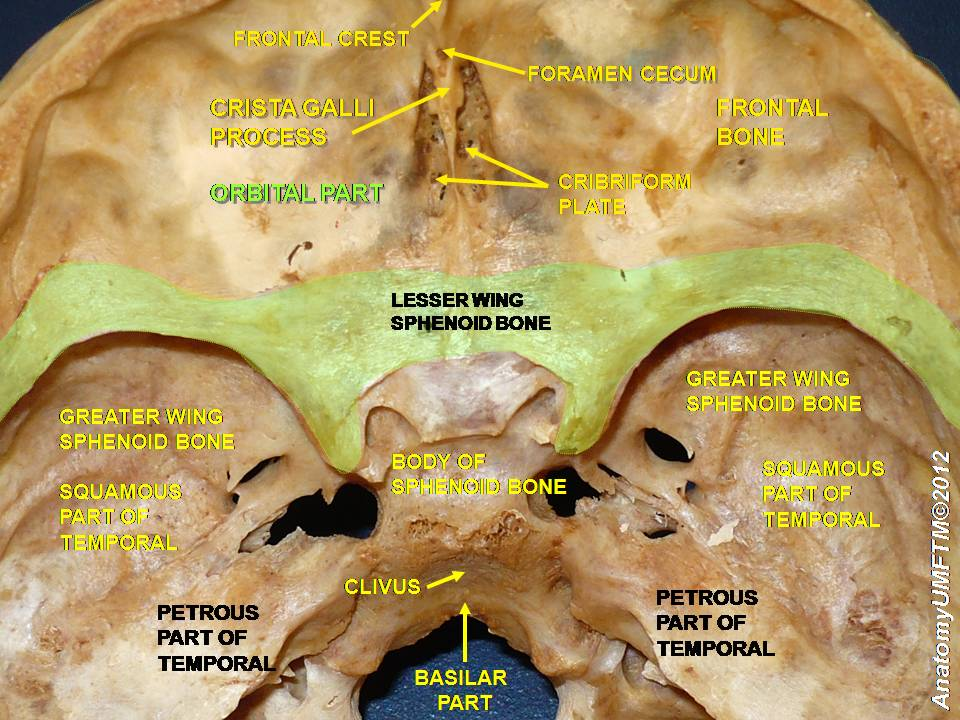
Orbital part of frontal bone
