= Hila =

Hila may refer to:

- plural form of Hilum
- Village in Israel: Mitzpe Hila
- Hila (given name), in Hebrew
- For the Islamic concept of "stratagem", see Ḥiyal
- Hila, Ambon, the town on the Indonesian island of Ambon where Fort Amsterdam was sited.
- Village Development Committee in Nepal
- Siren (DC Comics), a DC Comics character who has the name Hila.
