= Brow ridge =

Bony ridge located above the eye sockets of all primates

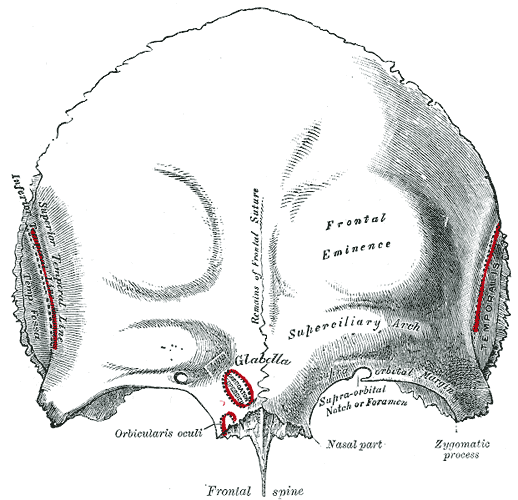
- Frontal bone. Outer surface. Brow ridge labelled as "superciliary arch" at center right).

Details

Identifiers
- Latin: arcus superciliaris
- TA98: A02.1.03.005
- TA2: 524
- FMA: 52850

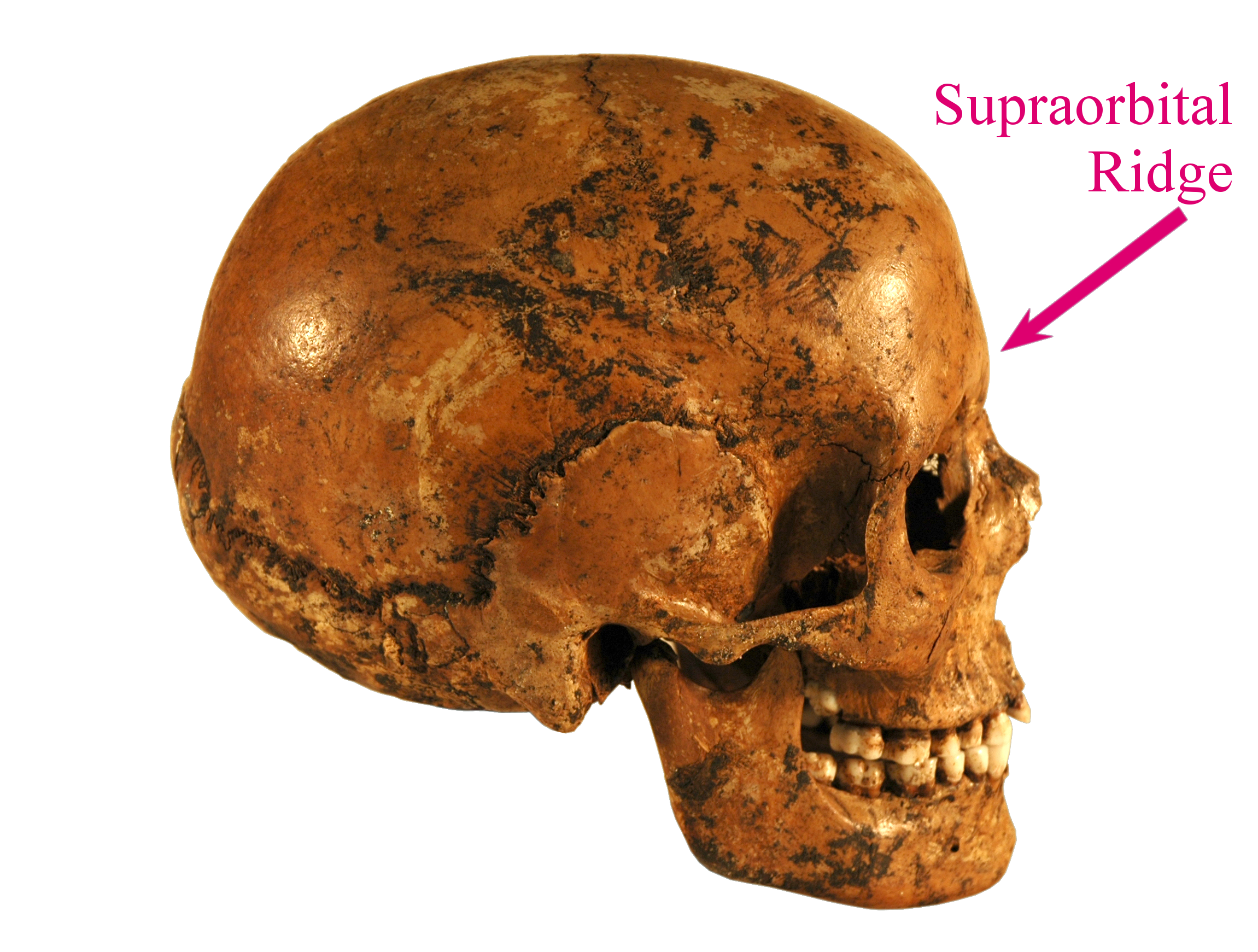
The brow ridges are often not well expressed in human females, as pictured above in a female skull, and are most easily seen in profile.

The brow ridge, or supraorbital ridge known as superciliary arch in medicine, is a bony ridge located above the eye sockets of all primates and some other animals. In humans, the eyebrows are located on their lower margin.

== Structure ==
The brow ridge is a nodule or crest of bone situated on the frontal bone of the skull. It forms the separation between the forehead portion itself (the squama frontalis) and the roof of the eye sockets (the pars orbitalis). Normally, in humans, the ridges arch over each eye, offering mechanical protection. In other primates, the ridge is usually continuous and often straight rather than arched. The ridges are separated from the frontal eminences by a shallow groove. The ridges are most prominent medially, and are joined to one another by a smooth elevation named the glabella.

Typically, the arches are more prominent in men than in women, and vary between different human populations. Behind the ridges, deeper in the bone, are the frontal sinuses.

=== Terminology ===
The brow ridges, being a prominent part of the face in some human populations and a trait linked to sexual dimorphism, have a number of names in different disciplines. In vernacular English, the terms eyebrow bone or eyebrow ridge are common. The more technical terms frontal or supraorbital arch, ridge or torus (or tori to refer to the plural, as the ridge is usually seen as a pair) are often found in anthropological or archaeological studies. In medicine, the term arcus superciliaris (Latin) or the English translation superciliary arch. This feature is different from the supraorbital margin and the margin of the orbit.

Some paleoanthropologists distinguish between frontal torus and supraorbital ridge. In anatomy, a torus is a projecting shelf of bone that unlike a ridge is rectilinear, unbroken and goes through glabella. Some fossil hominins, in this use of the word, have the frontal torus, but almost all modern humans only have the ridge.

=== Development ===
==== Spatial model ====
The Spatial model proposes that supraorbital torus development can be best explained in terms of the disparity between the anterior position of the orbital component relative to the neurocranium.

Much of the groundwork for the spatial model was laid down by Schultz (1940). He was the first to document that at later stages of development (after age 4) the growth of the orbit would outpace that of the eye. Consequently, he proposed that facial size is the most influential factor in orbital development, with orbital growth being only secondarily affected by size and ocular position.

Weindenreich (1941) and Biegert (1957, 1963) argued that the supraorbital region can best be understood as a product of the orientation of its two components, the face and the neurocranium.

The most composed articulation of the spatial model was presented by Moss and Young (1960), who stated that "the presence... of supraorbital ridges is only the reflection of the spatial relationship between two functionally unrelated cephalic components, the orbit and the brain" (Moss and Young, 1960, p282). They proposed (as first articulated by Biegert in 1957) that during infancy the neurocranium extensively overlaps the orbit, a condition that prohibits brow ridge development. As the splanchnocranium grows, however, the orbits begin to advance, thus causing the anterior displacement of the face relative to the brain. Brow ridges then form as a result of this separation.

==== Bio-mechanical model ====
The bio-mechanical model predicts that morphological variation in torus size is the direct product of differential tension caused by mastication, as indicated by an increase in load/lever ratio and broad craniofacial angle.

Research done on this model has largely been based on earlier work of Endo. By applying pressure similar to the type associated with chewing, he carried out an analysis of the structural function of the supraorbital region on dry human and gorilla skulls. His findings indicated that the face acts as a pillar that carries and disperses tension caused by the forces produced during mastication. Russell and Oyen et al. elaborated on this idea, suggesting that amplified facial projection necessitates the application of enhanced force to the anterior dentition in order to generate the same bite power that individuals with a dorsal deflection of the facial skull exert. In more prognathic individuals, this increased pressure triggers bone deposition to reinforce the brow ridges, until equilibrium is reached.

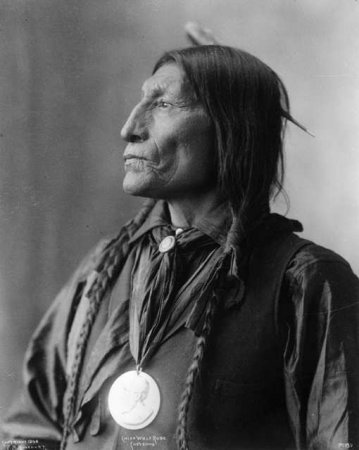
Native American man with pronounced brow ridge and sloping forehead

Oyen et al. conducted a cross-section study of Papio anubis in order to ascertain the relationship between palate length, incisor load and Masseter lever efficiency, relative to torus enlargement. Indications found of osteoblastic deposition in the glabella were used as evidence for supraorbital enlargement. Oyen et al.’s data suggested that more prognathic individuals experienced a decrease in load/lever efficiency. This transmits tension via the frontal process of the maxilla to the supraorbital region, resulting in a contemporary reinforcement of this structure. This was also correlated to periods of tooth eruption.

In a later series of papers, Russell developed aspects of this mode further. Employing an adult Australian sample, she tested the association between brow ridge formation and anterior dental loading, via the craniofacial angle (prosthion-nasion-metopion), maxilla breadth, and discontinuities in food preparation such as those observed between different age groups. Finding strong support for the first two criteria, she concluded that the supraorbital complex is formed as a result of increased tension due to the widening of the maxilla, thought to be positively correlated with the size of the masseter muscle, as well as with the improper orientation of bone in the superior orbital region.

=== Function ===
Some researchers have suggested that brow ridges function to protect the eyes and orbital bones during hand-to-hand combat, given that they are a dimorphic trait.

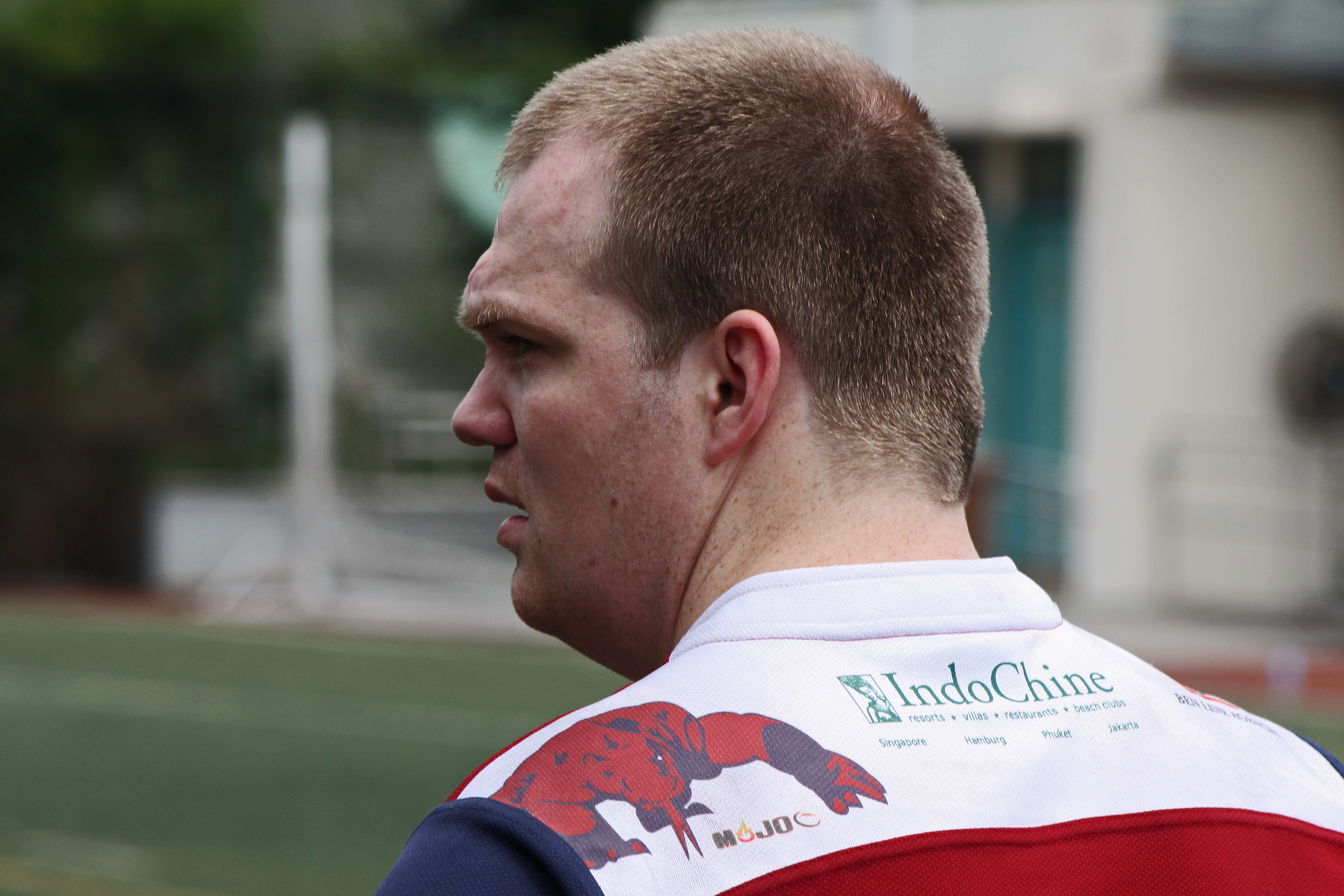
A rugby player with a pronounced supraorbital ridge

=== Paleolithic humans ===
Pronounced brow ridges were a common feature among paleolithic humans. Early modern people such as those from the finds from Jebel Irhoud and Skhul and Qafzeh had thick, large brow ridges, but they differ from those of archaic humans like Neanderthals by having a supraorbital foramen or notch, forming a groove through the ridge above each eye, although there were exceptions, such as Skhul 2 in which the ridge was unbroken, unlike other members of her tribe. This splits the ridge into central parts and distal parts. In current humans, almost always only the central sections of the ridge are preserved (if preserved at all). This contrasts with many archaic and early modern humans, where the brow ridge is pronounced and unbroken.

== Other animals ==
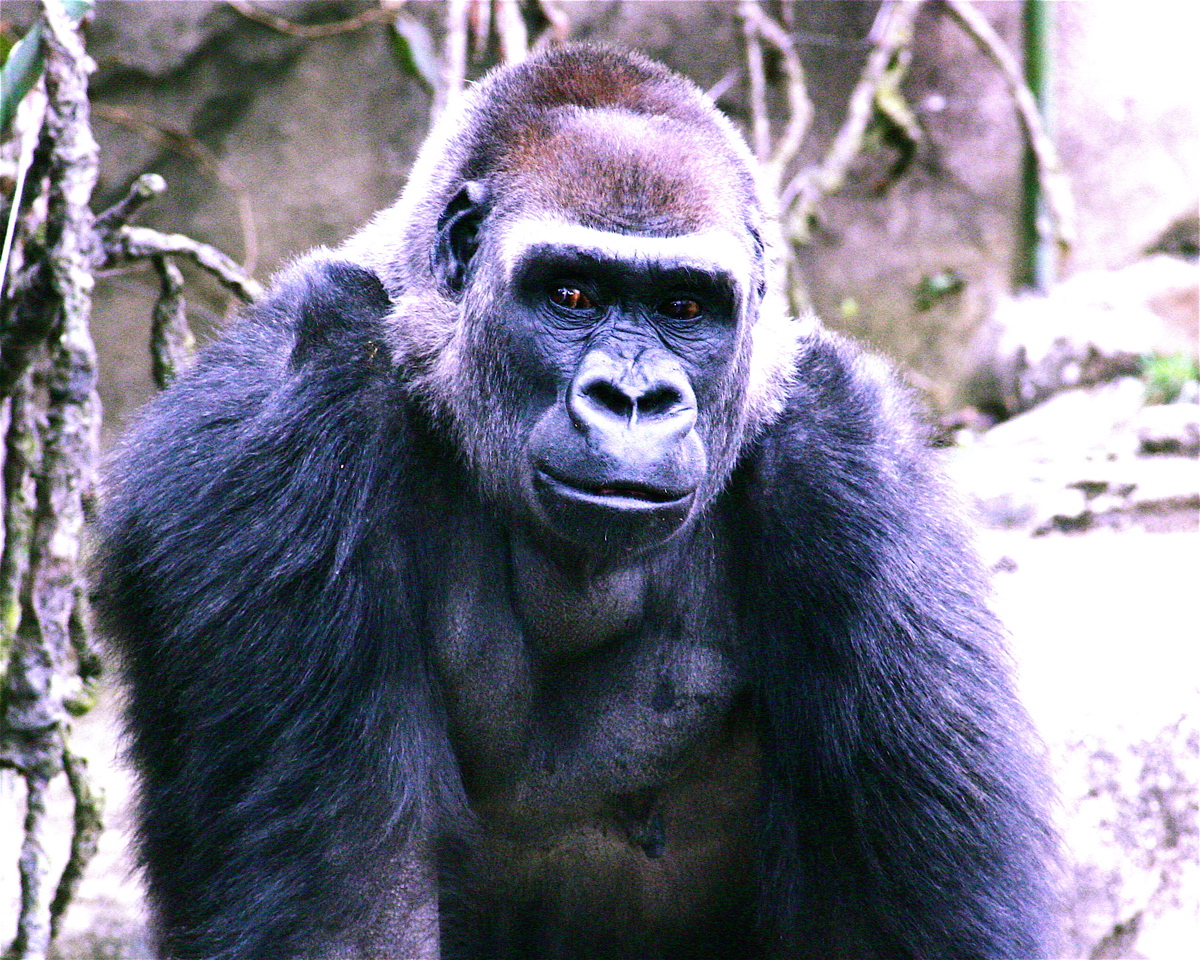
Gorilla with a frontal torus

The size of these ridges varies also between different species of primates, either living or fossil. The closest living relatives of humans, the great apes and especially gorillas or chimpanzees, have a very pronounced supraorbital ridge, which has also been called a frontal torus, while in modern humans and orangutans, it is relatively reduced. The fossil record indicates that the supraorbital ridge in early hominins was reduced as the cranial vault grew; the frontal portion of the brain became positioned above rather than behind the eyes, giving a more vertical forehead.

Supraorbital ridges are also present in some other animals, such as wild rabbits, eagles and certain species of sharks. The presence of a supraorbital ridge in the Korean field mouse has been used to distinguish it among related species.

== See also ==
- Occipitofrontalis muscle
- Supraciliary scale
- Frontal sinus
