= Frontal eminence =

Rounded elevation of the frontal bone of the skull

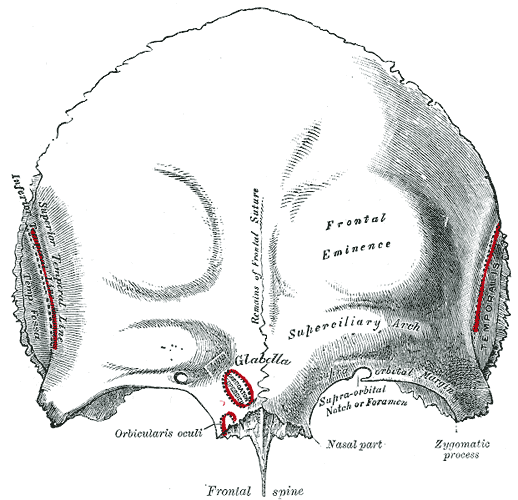
- Frontal bone. Outer surface. (Frontal eminence is labeled at center right.)

Details
- Part of: Frontal bone of skull
- System: Skeletal

Identifiers
- Latin: tuber frontale, eminentia frontalis
- TA98: A02.1.03.004
- TA2: 523
- FMA: 52852

A frontal eminence (or tuber frontale) is either of two rounded elevations on the frontal bone of the skull. They lie about 3 cm (1.2 in) above the supraorbital margin on each side of the frontal suture. They are the site of ossification of the frontal bone during embryological development, although may not be the first site.

The frontal eminences vary in size in different individuals, are occasionally asymmetrical, and are especially prominent in young skulls. The surface of the bone above them is smooth, and covered by the epicranial aponeurosis.

== See also ==
- Squamous part of the frontal bone
