= Fossa for lacrimal gland =

Depressions in the frontal bone

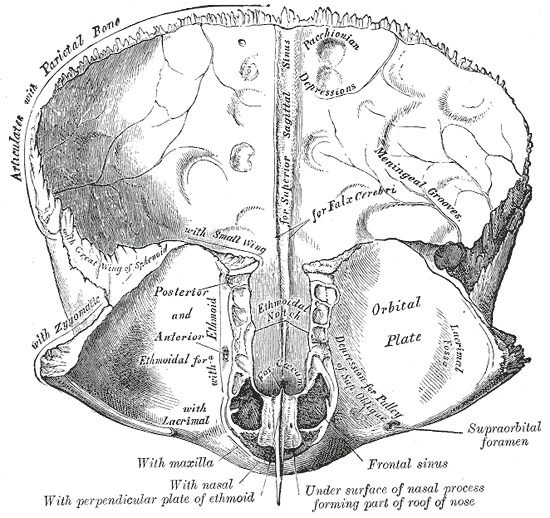
- Frontal bone. Inferior view. The location of the Lacrimal fossa for the Lacrimal gland

Details

Identifiers
- Latin: fossa glandulae lacrimalis
- TA98: A02.1.03.026
- TA2: 546
- FMA: 57396

The lacrimal fossa (or fossa for lacrimal gland) is located on the inferior surface of each orbital plate of the frontal bone. It is smooth and concave, and presents, laterally, underneath the zygomatic process, a shallow depression for the lacrimal gland.

== See also ==
- Fossa for lacrimal sac
