= Sagittal sulcus =

Groove inside the upper two-thirds of the front of the skull

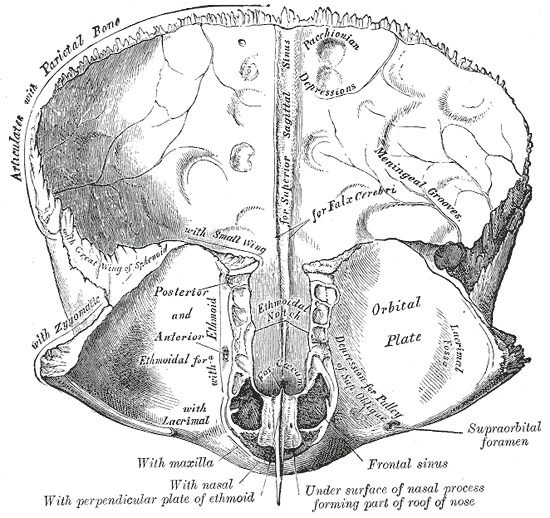
- Frontal bone. Inner surface. (Sagittal sulcus visible at center but not labeled.)

Details

Identifiers
- Latin: sulcus sinus sagittalis superioris
- TA98: A02.1.00.038
- TA2: 441
- FMA: 57118

The sagittal sulcus is a midline groove that runs across the internal surfaces of part of the squamous part of the frontal bone, the parietal bones, and part of the occipital bones. The sagittal sulcus accommodates the superior sagittal sinus. The falx cerebri attaches to the edge of the sagittal sulcus on either side.

On the inferior portion of the squamous part of the frontal bone, the edges of the sagittal sinus converge to form a single midline ridge, the frontal crest (which also gives attachment to the falx cerebri).
