= Frontalis =

Frontalis may refer to:

- Crista frontalis, the frontal crest, a crest on the internal surface of the squama frontalis of the frontal bone
- Frontalis muscle, a thin, quadrilateral fascia muscle located on the front of the head
- Sinus frontalis, the frontal sinus, mucosa-lined airspaces within the bones of the face and skull
- Squama frontalis, two surfaces of the squama of the frontal bone
- Sutura frontalis, the frontal suture, a dense connective tissue structure that divides the two halves of the frontal bone of the skull in infants and children

== Subspecies ==
- Bos gaurus frontalis, a subspecies of the gaur, a wild bovine animal of South Asia and Southeast Asia
- Chloropsis aurifrons frontalis, a subspecies in the species Chloropsis aurifrons, the golden-fronted leafbird, a bird

== See also ==
- Occipitofrontalis muscle, a muscle which covers parts of the skull
