= Fort Amsterdam (disambiguation) =

Fort Amsterdam usually refers to the 17th century Dutch fort built in what is now New York City.

Fort Amsterdam may also refer to:

- Fort Amsterdam, Ambon, Indonesia
- Fort Amsterdam (Curaçao)
- Fort Amsterdam, Ghana
- Fort Amsterdam (Sint Maarten)
