= Squama =

Squama (or squamous, squame) refers to a structure shaped like a decumbent scale of a fish.

More specifically, it can refer to:

- Squama frontalis
- Squama occipitalis
- Squama temporalis, the squamous portion of the temporal bone
- Squamous cell

In Crustacea, it can refer to the scaphocerite, a scale-like, flattened exopod of the antenna.

In the Bivalvia, it refers to a thin, long, concentric imbrication.

Squamous epithelium refers to epithelium, e.g. the skin, composed of squamous cells.

See also:

- Desquamation
