= Foramen cecum (frontal bone) =

Foramen in the frontal bone

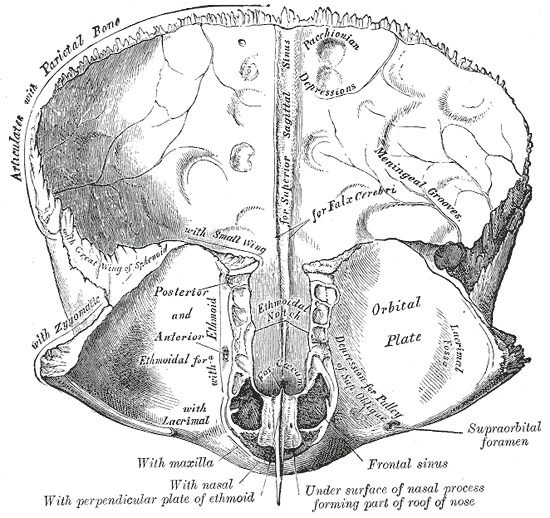
- Frontal bone. Inner surface. (Foramen cecum visible as black hole near center bottom.)

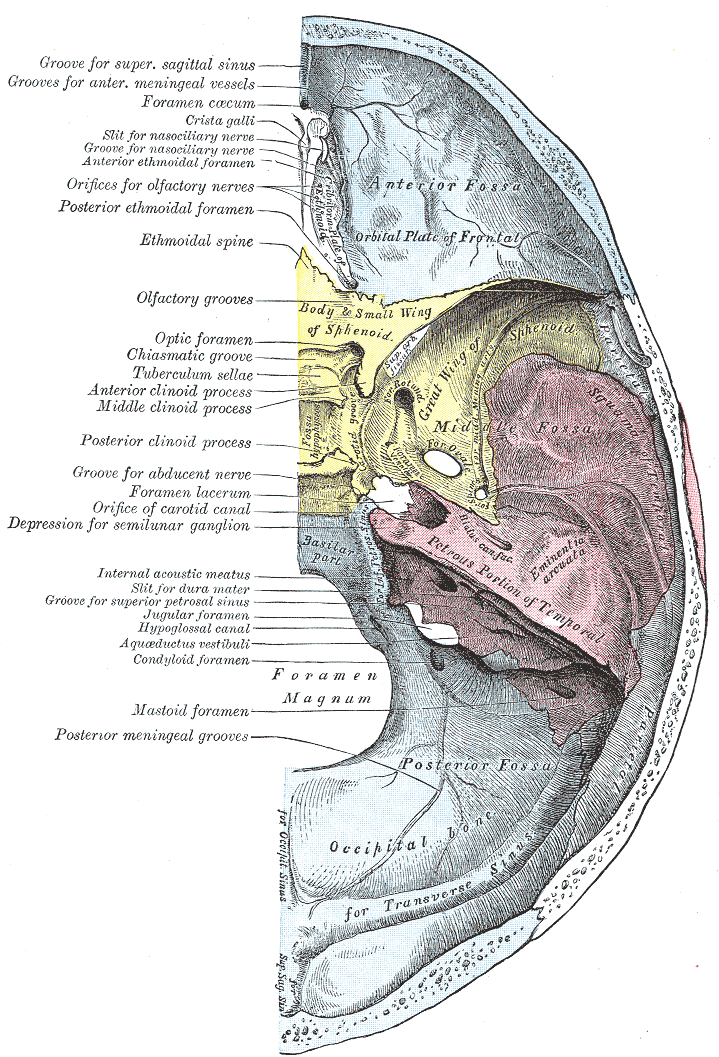
- Base of the skull. Upper surface. (Foramen cecum is third label from the top.)

Details

Identifiers
- Latin: foramen caecum ossis frontalis
- TA98: A02.1.03.018
- TA2: 537
- FMA: 57443

The frontal crest of the frontal bone ends below in a small notch which is converted into a foramen, the foramen cecum (or foramen caecum), by articulation with the ethmoid.

The foramen cecum varies in size in different subjects, and is frequently impervious; when open, it transmits the emissary vein from the nose to the superior sagittal sinus. This has clinical importance in that infections of the nose and nearby areas can be transmitted to the meninges and brain from what is known as the danger triangle of the face.

== Additional images ==
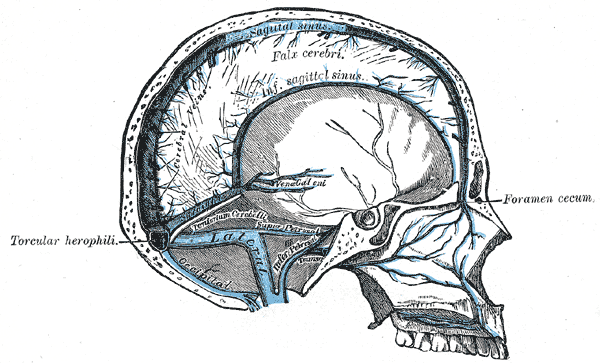
Sagittal section of the skull, showing the sinuses of the dura

Photo with foramina of skull labeled. Foramen cecum is labeled at the top right.

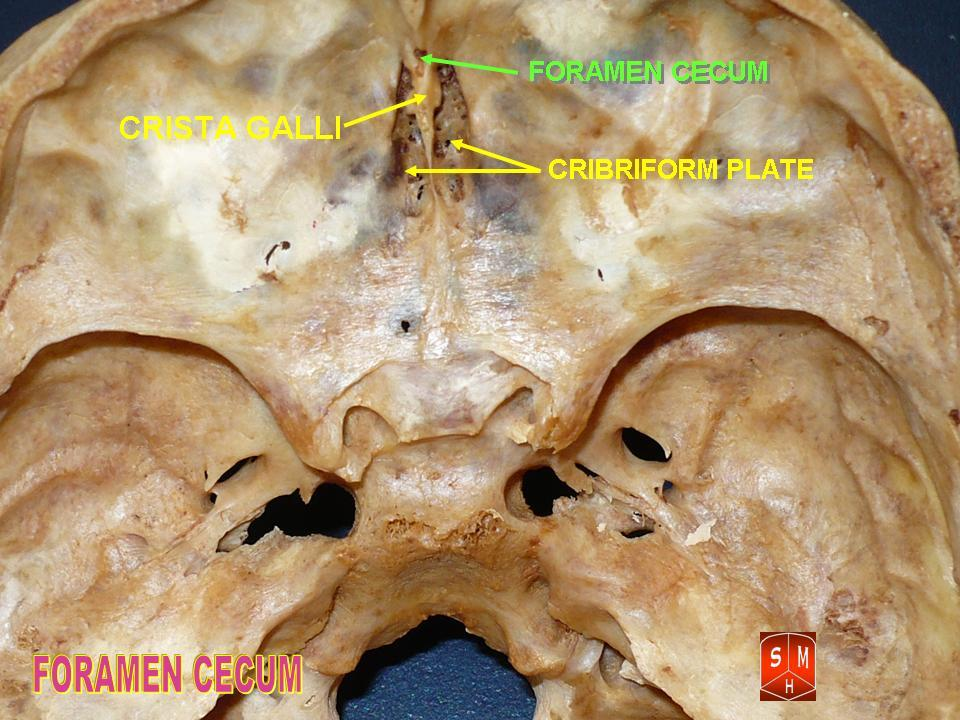
Foramen cecum

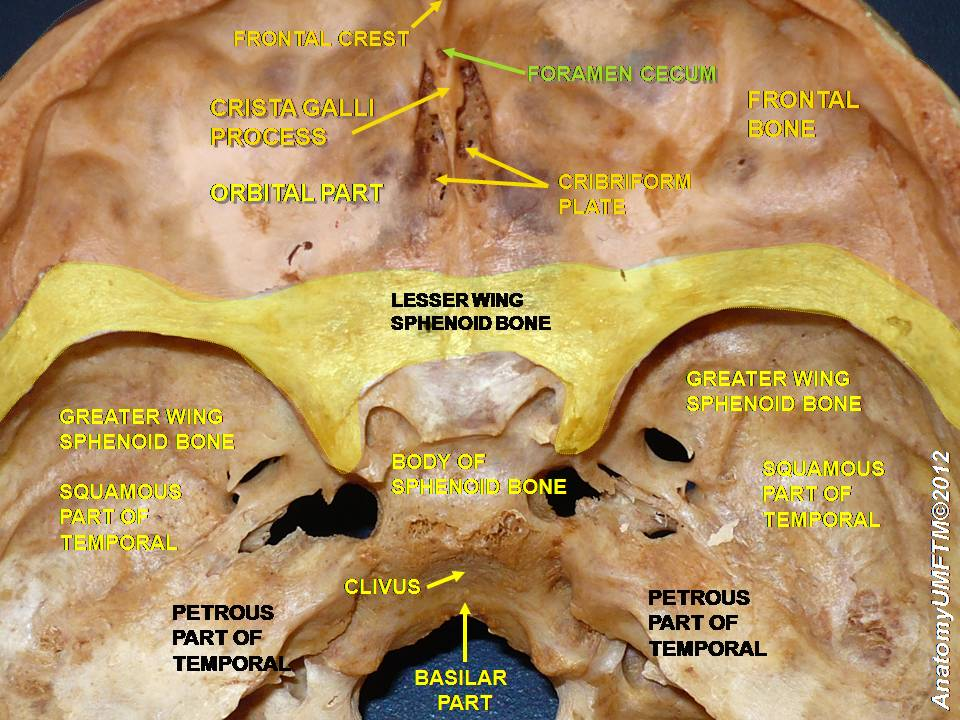
Foramen cecum

== See also ==
- Foramina of skull
