= Hila (given name) =

Hila or Hilla (Hebrew: הילה) is a Hebrew feminine given name meaning "halo". It was among the most popular given names for girls in Israel in 2012.

== People ==
=== First name ===
- Hilla Becher (1934–2015), German photographer
- Hila Bronstein (born 1983), German singer, known as a member of Bro'Sis
- Hila Elmalich (1973–2007), Israeli fashion model
- Hila Klein (born 1987), an Israeli-American YouTube comedian
- Hilla Limann (1934–1998), Ghanaian politician and president
- Hila Lulu Lin (born 1964), Israeli painter
- Hilla Nachshon (born 1980), Israeli actress and television presenter
- Hila Plitmann (born 1973), American singer
- Hila Sedighi (born 1985), Iranian poet and painter
- Hilla Vidor (born 1975), Israeli actress
- Hilla von Rebay (1890–1967), American artist

=== Surname ===
- Ardit Hila (born 1993), Albanian football player
- Elena Hila (born 1974), Romanian athlete

== See also ==
- Hila (disambiguation)
- Hillah, Iraq
