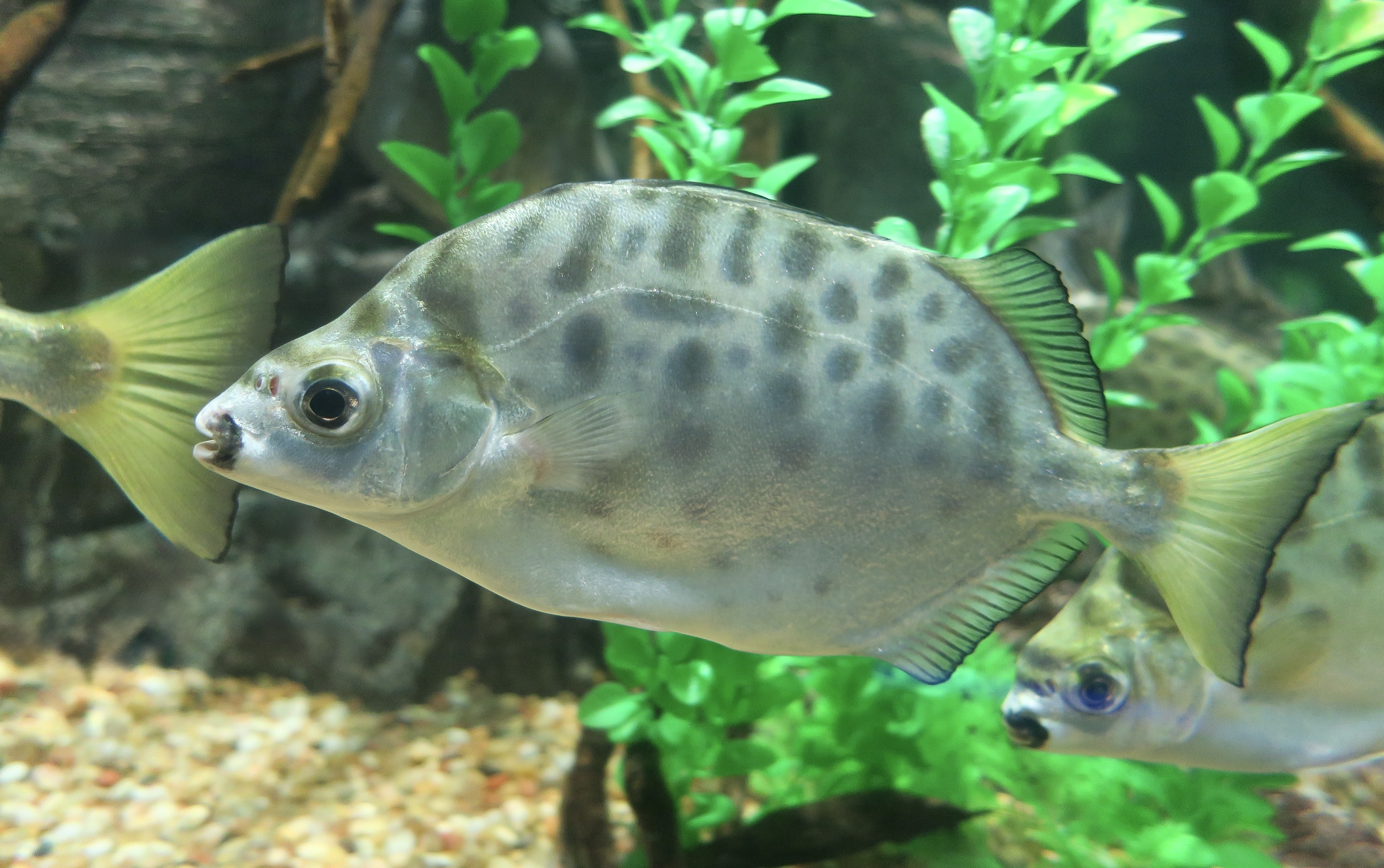
- At OdySea Aquarium.

Conservation status
- Least Concern (IUCN 3.1)

Scientific classification
- Kingdom: Animalia
- Phylum: Chordata
- Class: Actinopterygii
- Order: Acanthuriformes
- Family: Scatophagidae
- Genus: Selenotoca; Myers, 1936
- Species: S. multifasciata

Binomial name
- Selenotoca multifasciata (Richardson, 1846)

Synonyms
- Scatophagus multifasciatus Richardson, 1846

= Spotbanded scat =

Species of fish

The spotbanded scat (Selenotoca multifasciata), also known as the striped scat, banded scat, barred scat, butterfish, John Dory, Johnny Dory, old maid, Southern butter-fish or striped butterfish, is a species of ray-finned fish, belonging to the family Scatophagidae, the scats. They are found in the eastern Indian Ocean and southwestern Pacific Ocean.

== Taxonomy ==
The spotbanded scat was first formally described in 1846 as Scatophagus multifasciatus by the Scottish naval surgeon, naturalist and arctic explorer Sir John Richardson with the type locality given as King George Sound in Western Australia, although this is several hundred kilometres from its known range and is probably an error on the type specimen's label and the type locality should be farther north, and the description was published in the Ichthyology of the voyage of H.M.S. Erebus & Terror. In 1936 the American ichthyologist George S. Myers reclassified Scatophagus multifasciatus in to a new monotypic genus Selenotoca. In 1938, the British ichthyologist Alec Fraser-Brunner described a second species for the genus Selenotoca papuensis from New Guinea but Catalog of Fishes states that this taxon is a synonym of S. multiasciatus, although FishBase lists it as a valid species.

The genus name Selenotoca is a compound of selene meaning "moon" and tokos which means "offspring", the compound word meaning "born of the moon", Myers did not explain the allusion nor is it clear. The specific name means multifasciatus "many banded", a reference to the dark vertical bars on the back and upper flanks of this species.

== Description ==
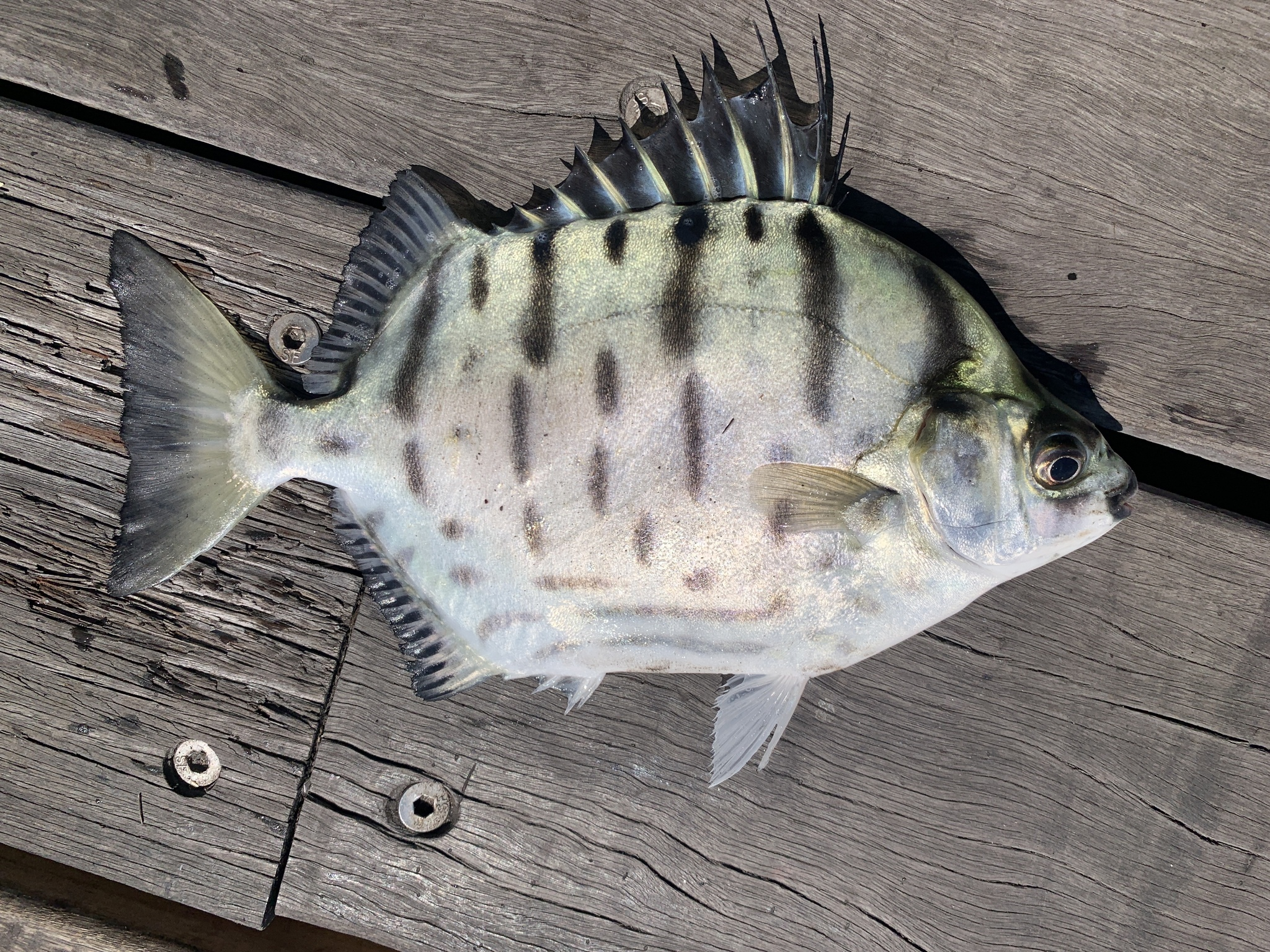
In Australia

The spotbanded scat has a deep, compressed body covered in very small ctenoid scales. They have a steep dorsal profile to the head, a moderately large eye which has a diameter which is markedly shorter than the length of the rounded snout length. The small, horizontal mouth is not protractile and there are several rows of bristle like teeth on the jaws. The dorsal fin has 7–12 spines and 16 soft rays while the anal fin has 4 spines and 15–16 soft rays. The first spine in the dorsal fin lies flat and there is a deep incision between spiny and soft rayed parts of the dorsal fin. The caudal fin is rounded in juveniles and truncate in adults. The rear margins of the soft rayed parts of the dorsal and anal fins is diagonal. This species attains a maximum total length of 40 cm (16 in). The background colour of this species is greenish or silvery with many dark, vertical bars on the upper flanks and spots, typically smaller than eye, arranged in roughly vertical rows on the lower flanks. The lips are black. The rear margins of the caudal fin and of the soft rayed parts of the anal and dorsal fins have a thin black margin which fades completely in individuals with a standard length longer than 6 cm (2.4 in).

== Distribution and habitat ==
The spotbanded scat is found from Sulawesi and Papua in eastern Indonesia, Papua New Guinea, New Caledonia and northern and eastern Australia. In Australia this species' range extends from Shark Bay in Western Australia along the northern coasts to Sydney in New South Wales. They inhabit brackish mangrove estuaries and coastal freshwater.

== Biology ==
The spotbanded scat form schools over sandy areas in estuaries and in river mouths. They are omnivores, feeding on small benthic invertebrates and detritus. There is a venom gland at the base of each spine and a painful wound can be caused if the spines puncture the skin when handling this fish.

== Utilisation ==
The spotbanded scat is targeted by recreational anglers. Juveniles are collected for the aquarium trade.
