= Fovea =

Fovea (/ˈfoʊviə/) (Latin for "pit"; plural foveae /ˈfoʊvii/) is a term in anatomy. It refers to a pit or depression in a structure.

== Human anatomy ==
- Fovea centralis of the retina
- Fovea buccalis or dimple
- Fovea of the femoral head
- Trochlear fovea of the frontal bone
- Pterygoid fovea of the mandible neck
- Fovea ethmoidalis part of the frontal bone of skull that separates ethmoid sinuses from the anterior cranial fossa.
- Fovea cardiaca

== Spider anatomy ==
- Fovea (spider), a depression in the centre of the carapace

== See also ==
- Hilum, another term associated with anatomic pits or depressions
  - Hilum (anatomy)
  - Hilum (biology)
