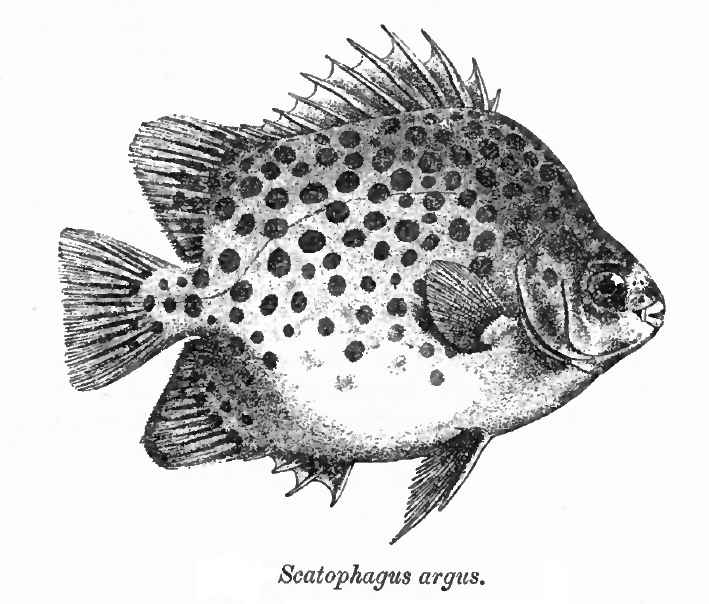
- (Scatophagus argus)

Scientific classification
- Kingdom: Animalia
- Phylum: Chordata
- Class: Actinopterygii
- Division: Teleostei
- Order: Acanthuriformes
- Family: Scatophagidae
- Genus: Scatophagus; Cuvier in Cuvier and Valenciennes, 1831

Type species
- Chaetodon argus Linnaeus, 1766

Species
- See text

Synonyms
- Cacodoxus Cantor, 1849; Desmoprenes Fowler & B.A. Bean, 1929; Prenes Gistel, 1848

= Scatophagus =

Genus of fishes

Scatophagus is a genus of ray-finned fishes belonging to the family Scatophagidae. They are found in the Indo-Pacific region. Species in this genus are referred as spotted scats.

== Taxonomy ==
Scatophagus was first formally described as a genus in 1831 by the French zoologist Georges Cuvier with Chaetodon argus which had been described from India by Linnaeus in 1766 later designated as the type species. The genus name is a compound of skatos meaning "dung" and phaga which means to eat, a reference to this species purported taste for human faeces.

== Species ==
The genus Scatophagus contains three extant species:

- Scatophagus argus (Linnaeus, 1766) (Spotted scat)
- Scatophagus magnus (Endruweit, 2024)
- Scatophagus tetracanthus (Lacépède, 1802) (African scat)

Several fossil species (Scatophagus frontalis Agassiz, 1839 from the Early Eocene, Scatophagus capellinii Bassani, 1889 from the Early Oligocene) from Italy were previously placed in this genus. However, more recent studies indicate that while they are scats, they are unique enough belong to their own genera, and have thus placed them in Eoscatophagus and Oligoscatophagus.

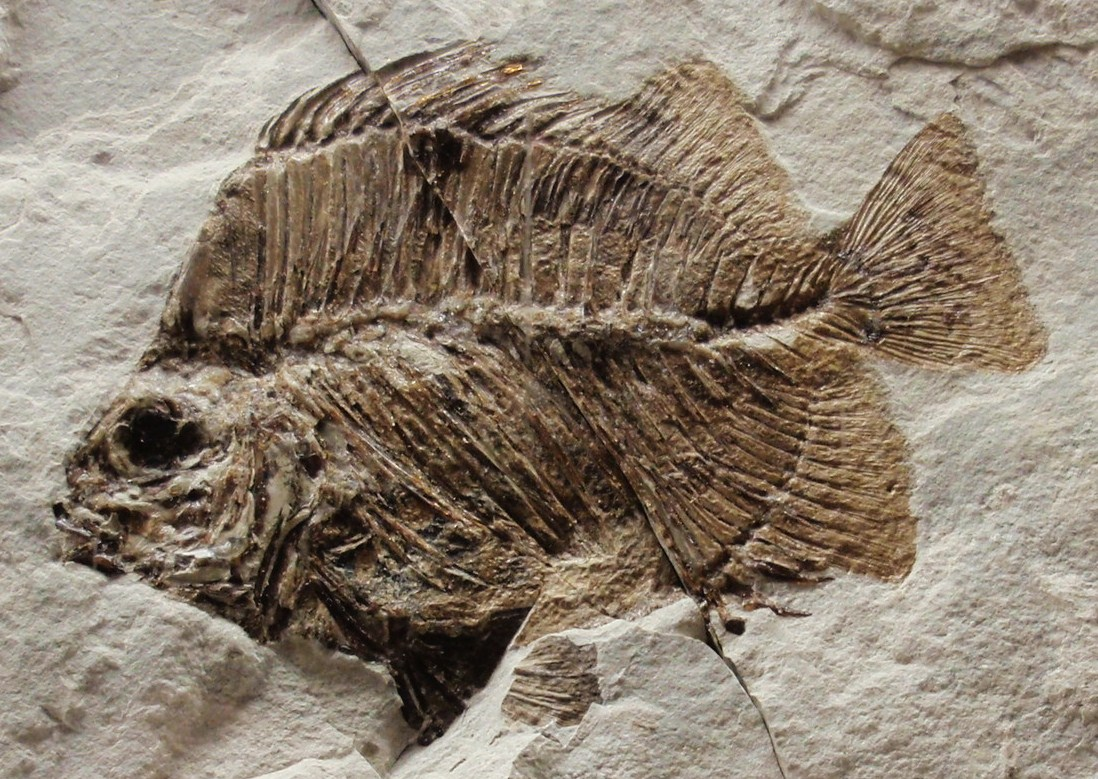
Eoscatophagus frontalis fossil

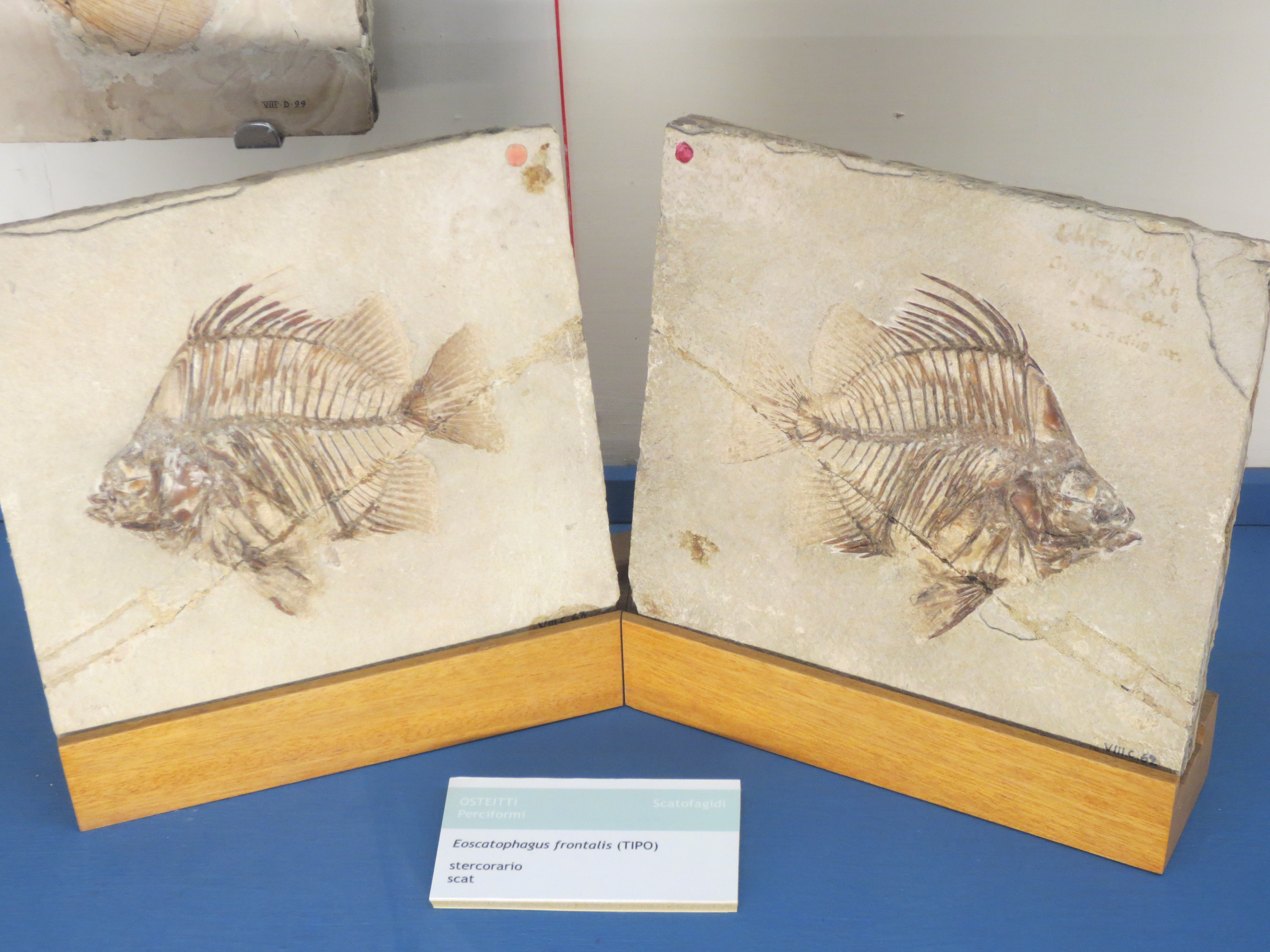
Eoscatophagus frontalis fossil in the Natural History Museum in Verona, Italy.

== Characteristics ==
Scatophagus species have highly compressed, rectangular bodies. The dorsal profile of the head rises steeply to the nape, they have a rounded snout, as is the space between the eyes. The small mouth is horizontal, and cannot be protruded, and has several rows of small bristle like teeth on the jaws teeth in several rows. There are no teeth on the roof of the mouth. The dorsal fin has 11-12 robust spines and 16-18 soft rays, the first spine lies flat and there is a deep incision between the spiny and soft rayed parts of the fin. The anal fin has 4 robust spines and 13-16 soft rays and the relatively small pectoral fins have 16-17 rays. The caudal fin may be truncate or weakly emarginate. although it is rounded in juveniles. The head and the body are covered with tiny ctenoid scales and these reach the soft rayed parts of the dorsal and anal fins. There are no spines or serrations on the opercular bones. They are silvery or greenish in colour marked with darker spots or bars. The scats vary in maximum total length from 30 cm (12 in) for S. tetracanthus up to 38 cm (15 in) for S. argus.

== Distribution and habitat ==
Scatophagus fishes are found in the Indo-Pacific from the coast of East Africa east into the western Pacific Ocean north to Japan, south to Australia and east to the Society Islands. One species, S.argus, has become an established introduced species off Malta and has been recorded occasionally off Florida. They are found in sheltered habitats in coastal areas, including in brackish water and even into freshwater rivers.

== Biology ==
Scatophagus fishes feed on a diverse diet which includes small invertebrates, algae, detritus and refuse. They are venomous, a gland on the lateral line produces venom and a groove takes this onto the spines. If envenomated the wound is painful and may ache for a number of hours.

== Utilisation ==
Scatophagus scats are caught using gill nets and traps and may be marketed fresh or salted. They feature in the live fish market in Hong Kong and are used in traditional Chinese medicine. They also appear in the aquarium trade.

== See also ==
- List of prehistoric bony fish genera
- List of aquarium fish by scientific name
