= Frontal crest =

Bone structure in the brain system

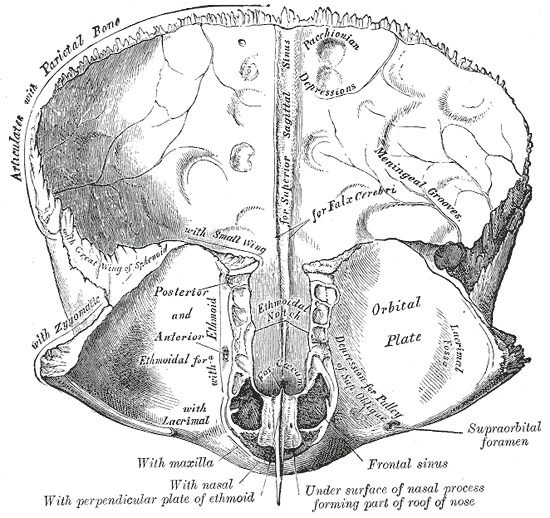
- Frontal bone. Inner surface. (Frontal crest visible at center but not labeled.)

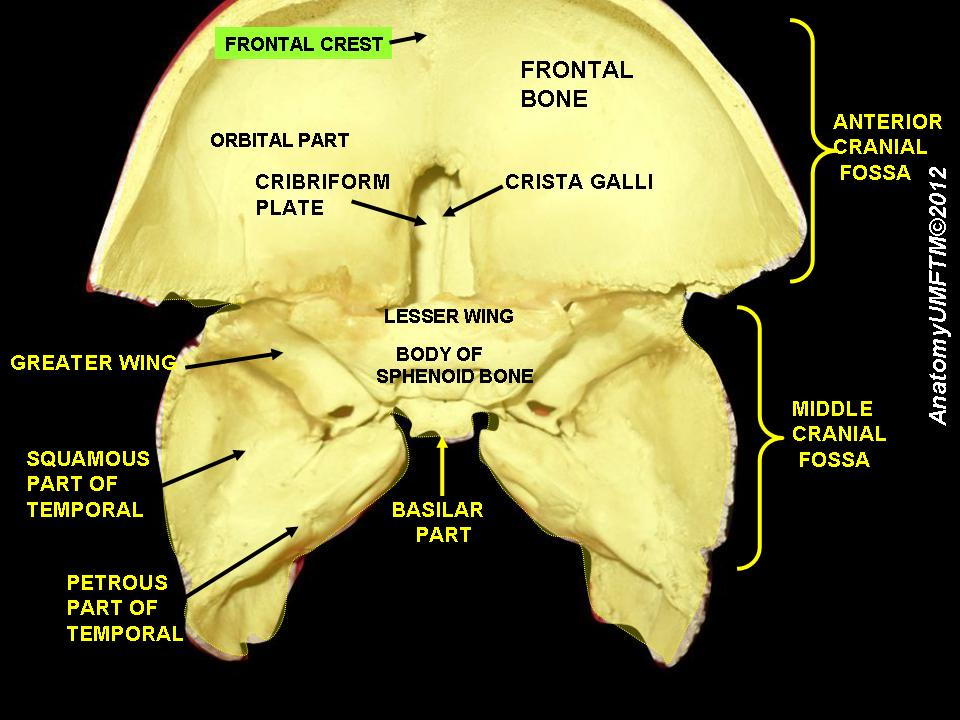
- Frontal crest

Details

Identifiers
- Latin: crista frontalis
- TA98: A02.1.03.016
- TA2: 536
- FMA: 57415

The frontal crest is a ridge on the internal surface of the squamous part of the frontal bone formed by the inferior convergence of the two edges of the sagittal sulcus. The frontal crest gives attachment to the falx cerebri.
