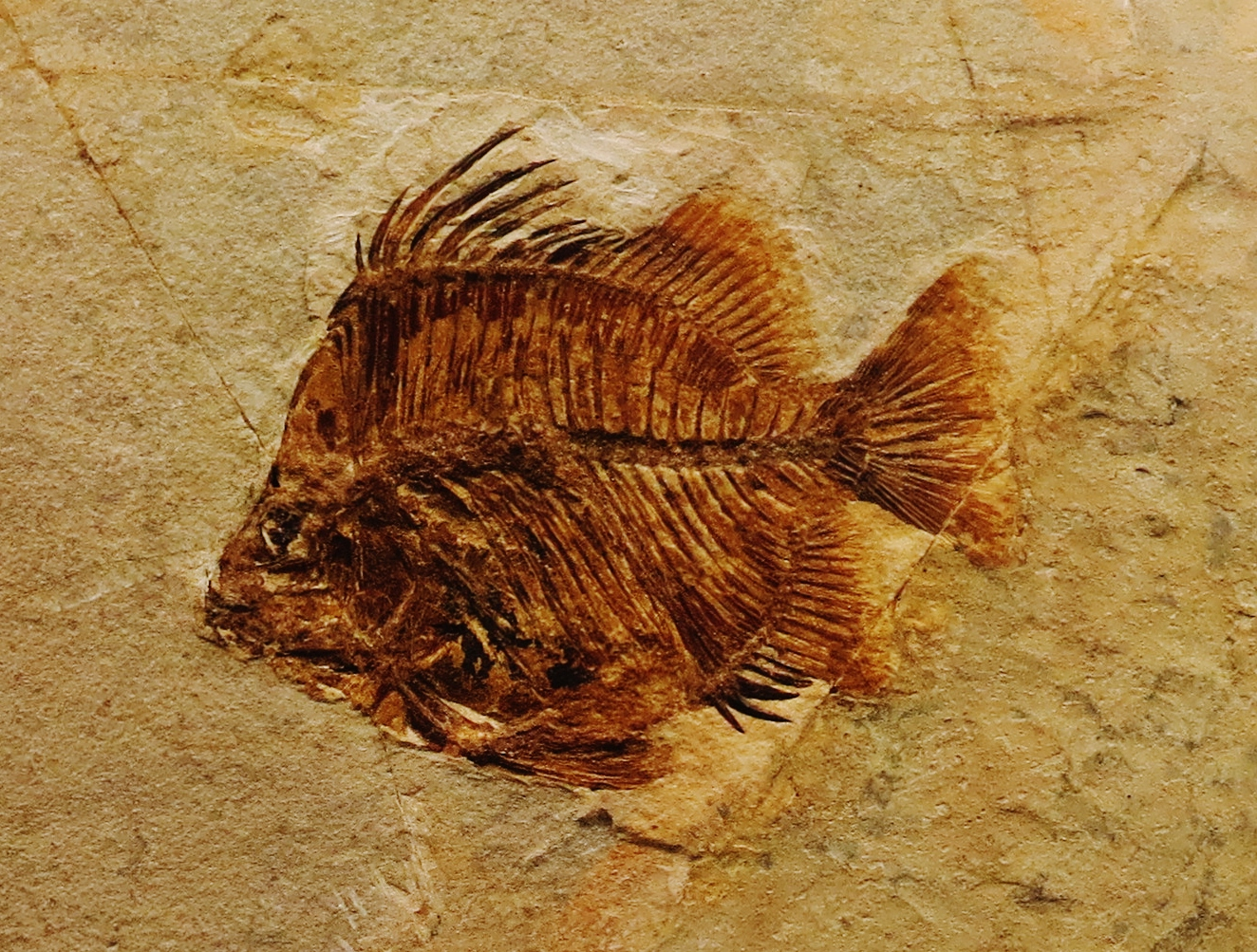
- Fossil specimen, Museo di Storia Naturale di Verona

Scientific classification
- Kingdom: Animalia
- Phylum: Chordata
- Class: Actinopterygii
- Order: Acanthuriformes
- Family: Scatophagidae
- Genus: †Eoscatophagus; Tyler & Sorbini, 1999
- Species: †E. frontalis

Binomial name
- †Eoscatophagus frontalis (Agassiz, 1839)

Synonyms
- †Scatophagus frontalis Agassiz, 1839

= Eoscatophagus =

Eoscatophagus Temporal range: Early Eocene

Extinct genus of fishes

Eoscatophagus ("dawn Scatophagus") is an extinct genus of marine ray-finned fish, in the family Scatophagidae, known from the Eocene. It contains a single species, E. frontalis, known from the Monte Bolca site of Italy.

It is the earliest scatophagid known from the fossil record. It was originally erroneously identified by Volta (1796) as a specimen of the spotted scat (Scatophagus argus, then known as Chaetodon argus) itself, before being described as its own species within Scatophagus by Agassiz (1839). It was moved to its own genus, Eoscatophagus, in 1999.

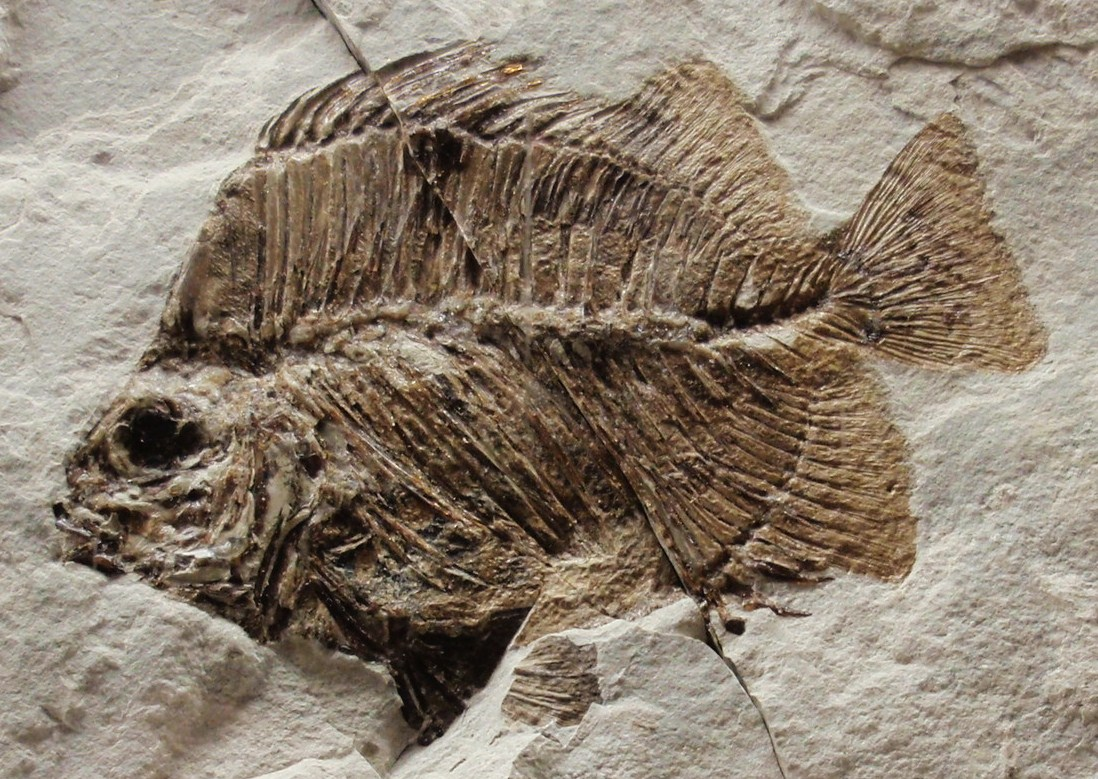
Fossil specimen

As the earliest known member of the Scatophagidae, it is often used for calibrating phylogenies of marine fish evolution.
