= Fort Amsterdam, Ambon =

Coordinates: 3.5827°S 128.0832°E

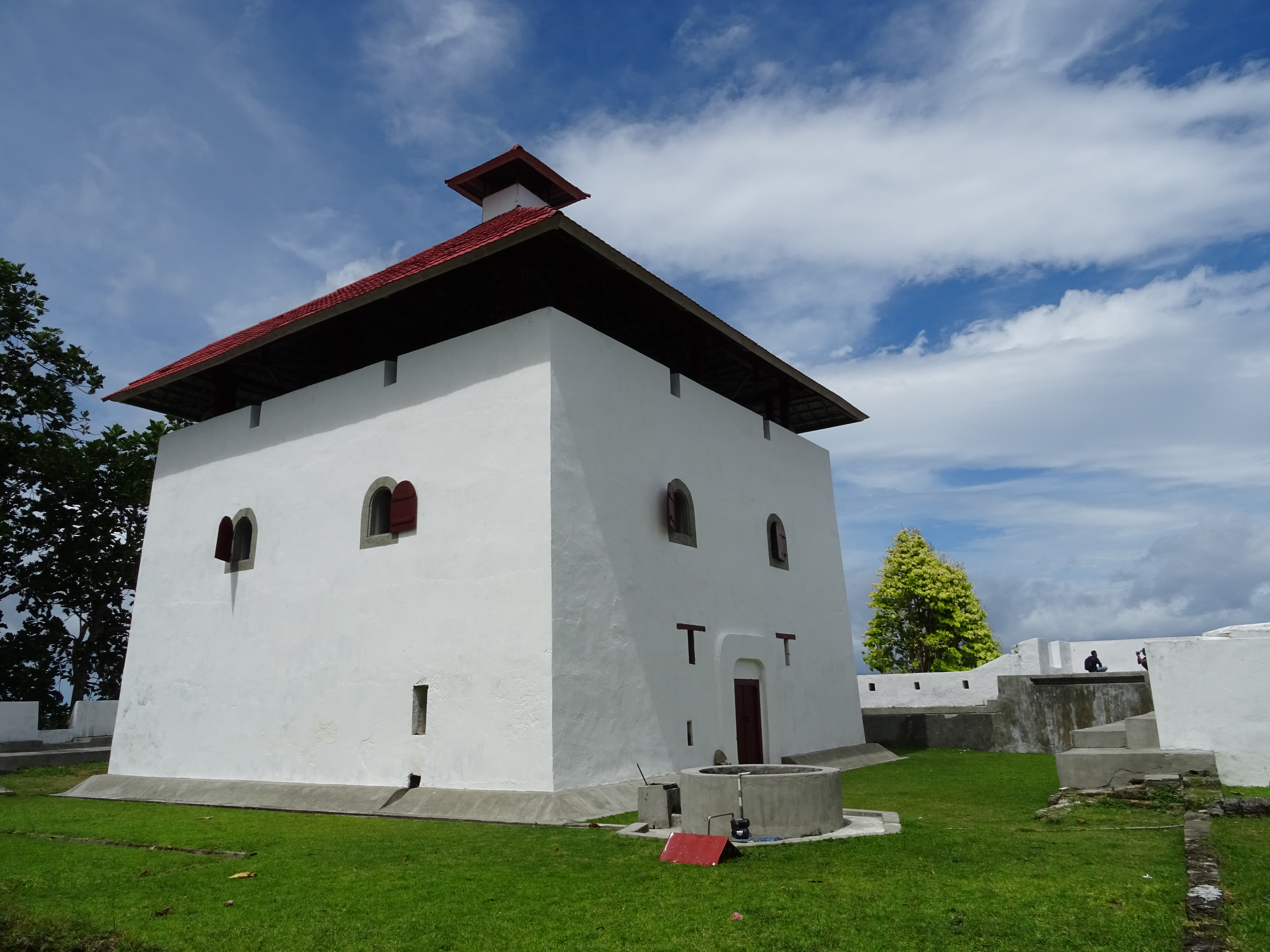
Fort Amsterdam of Hila, Ambon Island.

Fort Amsterdam (also formerly known as Blokhuis Amsterdam) is a fort and a blockhouse in Hila town, Leihitu Subdistrict, Central Maluku Regency, Ambon Island, Indonesia. The blockhouse was built in 1637 by the Dutch East Indies Company.

== Building ==
The blockhouse is a three-floored structure. It is roughly square in plan with area 16 x 16 m with 47 cm thick walls. The interior is 4.57 x 5.3 m in size. Each side of the building contains a window, with a door on the eastern wall. The ground floor is covered with bricks, and contains a prison and a gunpowder magazine. The upper floor is wooden. The uppermost storey is roofed. The buildings contains two bastions in the northeast corner and southwest corner (seaward). One of the corner of the building contains a watchtower.

The blockhouse is surrounded by a square-shaped defensive wall measuring 52 x 52 m. There are remnants of wall foundation measuring 62 x 35 m. The main gate is on the east side, while two smaller doorless gates is located to the north and to the south.

== History ==
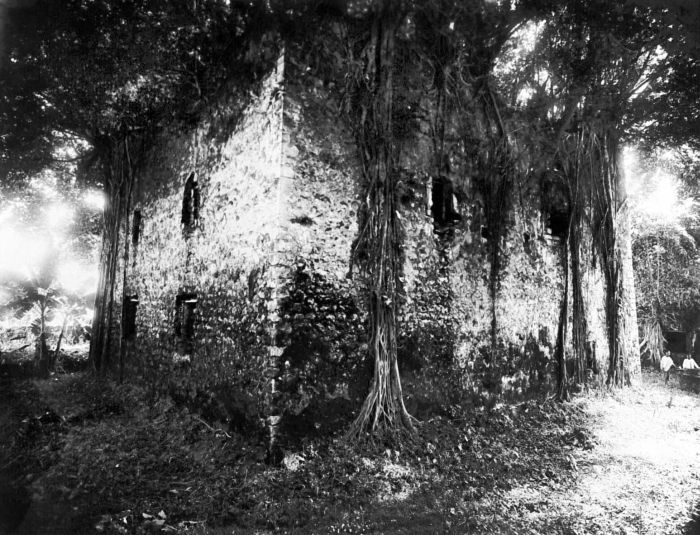
Deteriorating Fort Amsterdam in 1930.

Before the fort was built, a trade lodge was established here by Francisco Serrão in 1512, a Portuguese explorer and a cousin of Ferdinand Magellan.

In the 17th-century, the Dutch East Indies Company was formed and the Dutch colonize the entire island of Ambon. The lodge was converted into a defensive post. It is located in the northern coast of Ambon Island. Because of the local uprising led by Kapitan Kakialy between 1633 and 1654, the governor-general Jaan Ottens converted it into a defensive post in 1637 and was expanded by Gerrad Demmer in 1642 and by governor-general Anthony Caan in 1649. The fort was finalized by Arnold de Vlaming van Oudsthoorn from 1649 until 1656 and was named Fort Amsterdam. Rumphius, a great German botanist, lived in the fort from 1660 to 1670.

The fort was left neglected by the Dutch in the early 20th century. A large tree had grow around it before the Indonesian Department of Education and Culture decided to restore it in July 1991. The restoration was based on a picture from François Valentijn's Beschreiving van Amboinan.

The fort is not yet enacted as cultural heritage by the Directorate of Archaeological Heritage.

== See also ==
- List of forts
