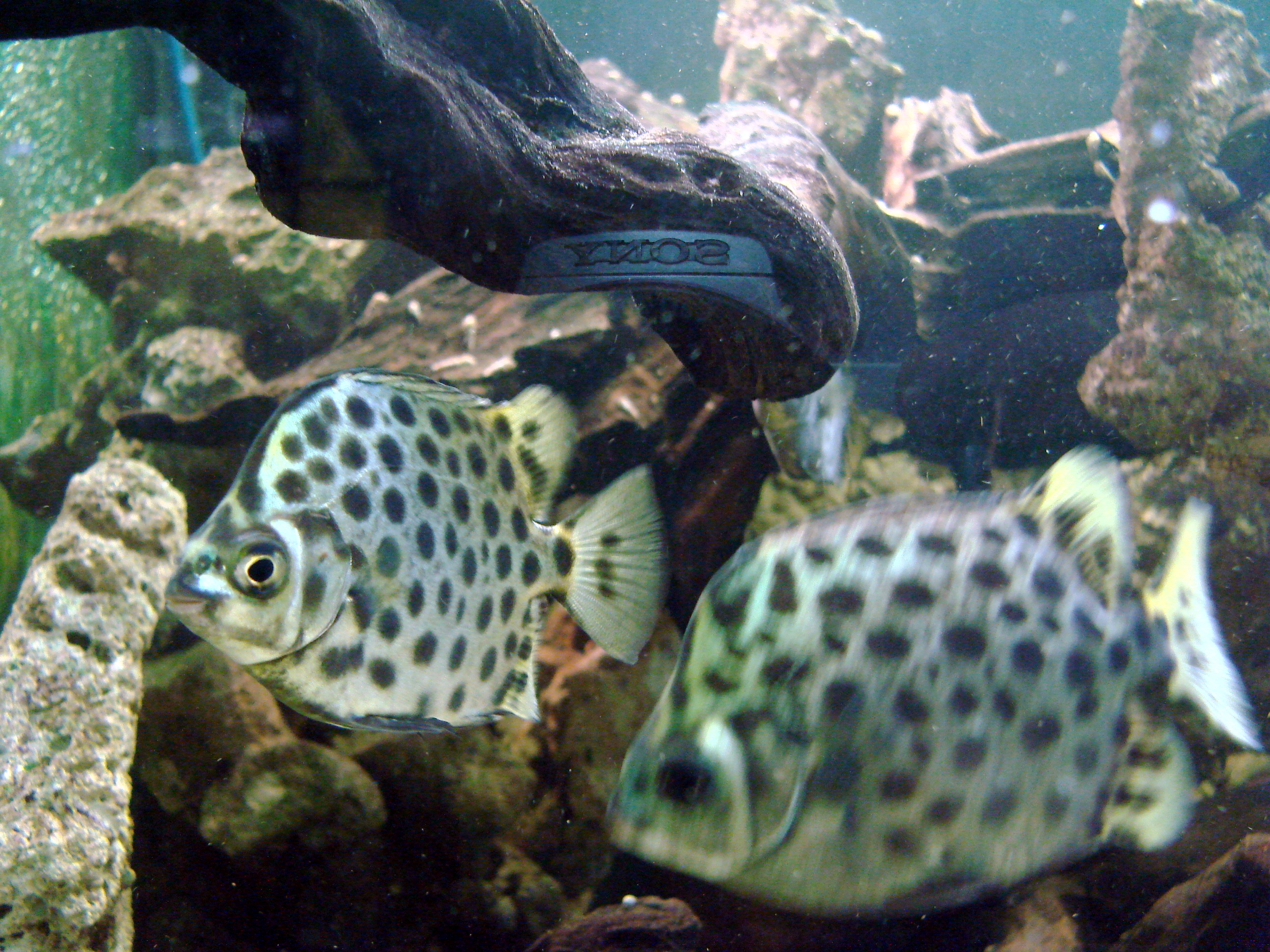
- Scatophagus argus

Scientific classification
- Kingdom: Animalia
- Phylum: Chordata
- Class: Actinopterygii
- Division: Teleostei
- Order: Acanthuriformes
- Family: Scatophagidae; Gill, 1883

Genera
- See text

Synonyms
- Prenidae Whiley, 1956

= Scatophagidae =

Scats Temporal range: Early Eocene to present

Family of fishes

Scatophagidae, the scats are a small family of ray-finned fishes in the order Acanthuriformes. They are found in the Indo-Pacific region but one species has been introduced elsewhere.

== Taxonomy ==
Scatophagidae was first formally described as a family in 1883 by the American ichthyologist Theodore Nicholas Gill. They are classified in the superfamily Siganiodea, along with the rabbitfishes of the family Siganidae, within the suborder Percoidei in the 5th edition of Fishes of the World. Other workers have classified them with the surgeonfishes in the order Acanthuriformes or as incertae sedis within the series Eupercaria. The name of the family comes from its type genus Scatophagus and this is a compound of skatos meaning "dung" and phaga which means to eat, a reference to its species' purported taste for human faeces.

== Genera ==
There are two genera classified within the Scatophagidae, each containing two extant species:

- Scatophagus Cuvier, 1831
- Selenotoca Myers, 1936

=== Fossil record ===
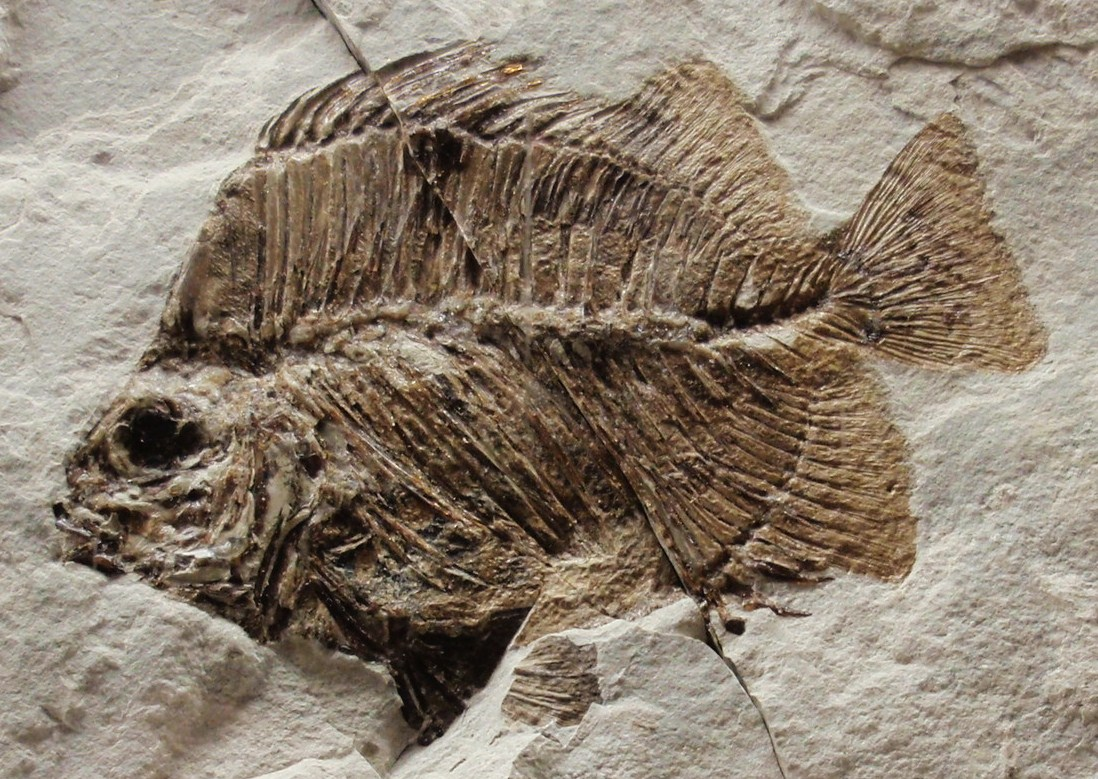
Eoscatophagus fossil

The fossil genus Eoscatophagus Tyler & Sorbini, 1999 (previously placed in Scatophagus) is known from the Early Eocene of Italy, and represents the earliest record of the family. Also known from Italy is Oligoscatophagus Tyler & Sorbini, 1999 from the Early Oligocene. Both these fossil genera contain species that were initially described in the 19th century as members of Scatophagus.

== Characteristics ==
Scatophagidae fishes, the scats, have highly compressed, oblong bodies. The dorsal profile of the head rises steeply to the nape, they have a rounded snout, as is the space between the eyes. The small mouth is horizontal, and cannot be protruded, and has several rows of small bristle-like teeth on the jaws. There are no teeth on the roof of the mouth. The dorsal fin has 11–12 robust spines and 16–18 soft rays, the first spine lies flat and there is a deep incision between the spiny and soft-rayed parts of the fin. The anal fin has 4 robust spines and 13–16 soft rays and the relatively small pectoral fins have 16–17 rays. The caudal fin may be truncate or weakly emarginate. although it is rounded in juveniles. The head and the body are covered with tiny ctenoid scales and these reach the soft rayed parts of the dorsal and anal fins. There are no spines or serrations on the opercular bones. They are silvery or greenish in colour marked with darker spots or bars. The scats vary in maximum total length from 9 cm (3.5 in) for Selenotoca papuensis up to 40 cm (16 in) for Selenotoca multifasciata.

== Distribution and habitat ==
Scatophagidae is native to the Indian and Pacific Oceans from the eastern coast of Africa into the western Pacific. The spotted scat (Scatophagus argus) has been introduced to Malta, where it has become established, and it has been recorded from Florida. Scats are found in harbours, brackish estuaries, and the lower reaches of freshwater streams.

== Biology ==
Scatophagidae fishes normally occur in schools and they feed during the day on a variety of benthic invertebrates, bottom detritus, algae and refuse.

== Utilisation ==
Scatophagidae fishes are too small to be of interest to commercial fisheries as food, they are caught using gill nets and fish traps. They appear in the aquarium trade.
