= Ethmoidal notch =

Notch in the frontal bone of the skull

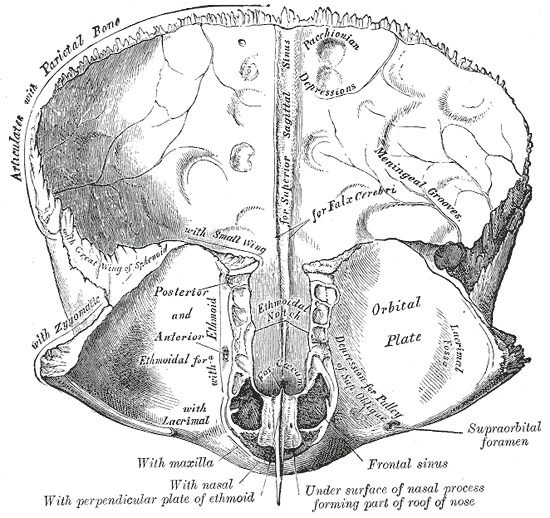
- Frontal bone. Inner surface (ethmoidal notch visible at center)

Details

Identifiers
- Latin: incisura ethmoidalis ossis frontalis
- TA98: A02.1.03.028
- TA2: 548
- FMA: 57388

The ethmoidal notch separates the two orbital plates; it is quadrilateral, and filled, in the articulated skull, by the cribriform plate of the ethmoid.

The margins of the notch present several half-cells which, when united with corresponding half-cells on the upper surface of the ethmoid, complete the ethmoidal sinuses.
