= Trochlear fovea =

Anatomical depression of the skull

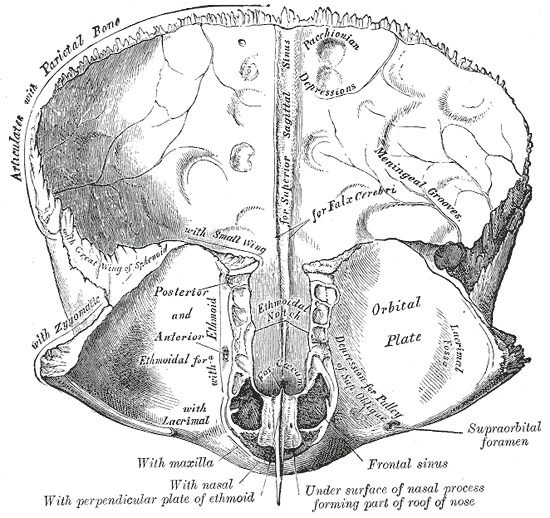
- Frontal bone. Inner surface. (Trochlear fovea not directly labeled, but visible at bottom right.)

Details

Identifiers
- Latin: fovea trochlearis
- TA98: A02.1.03.025
- TA2: 545
- FMA: 57399

The trochlear fovea is a slight depression on the anteromedial orbital surface of the orbital plate of the frontal bone. Attached to the trochlear fovea is the trochlea of the superior oblique muscle.
