= Hila, Ambon =

Hila
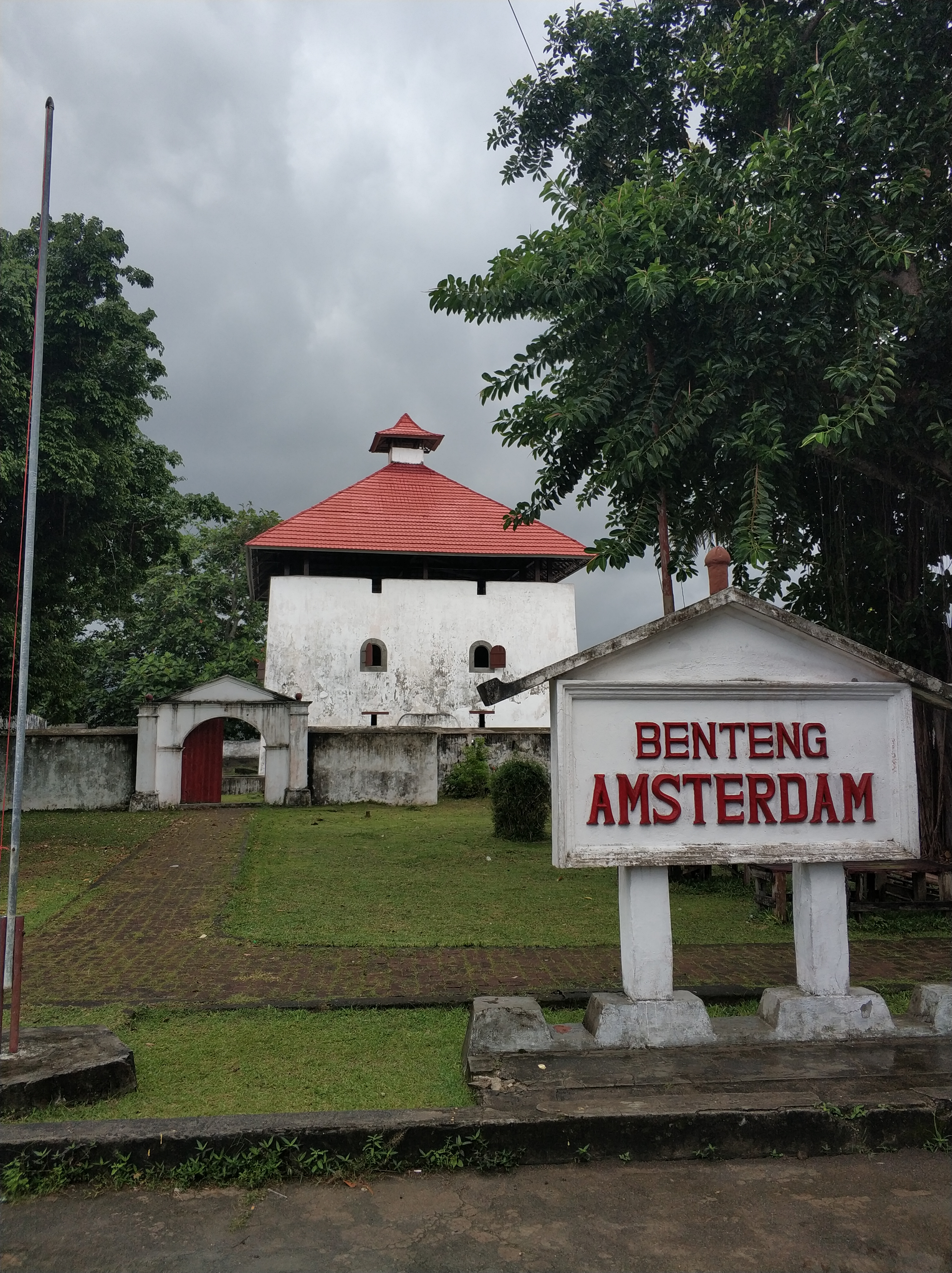
- Fort Amsterdam

- Location within Indonesia
- Coordinates: 3°34′55″S 128°5′10″E
- Country: Indonesia
- Province: Maluku

Population (2020)
  - Total: 7,707
- Time zone: UTC+5 (Indonesia Western Time)
- Postal code: 66100

Hila is a village on Ambon Island in the Maluku Islands of Indonesia where Fort Amsterdam is located. The area is largely agricultural and includes areas of coconut, sago palm, vegetable gardens, beans, cassava, groundnuts, tea, nutmeg, and clove. Sago and fish are staple foods along with imported rice. As of 2020 the population was approximately 7700.
