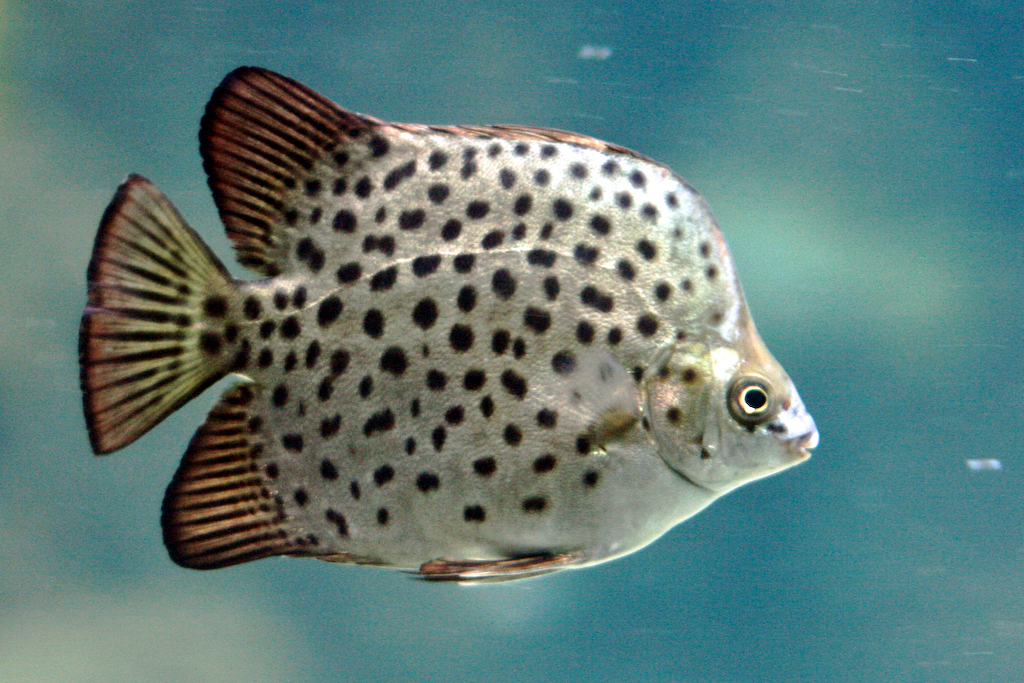

Conservation status
- Least Concern (IUCN 3.1)

Scientific classification
- Kingdom: Animalia
- Phylum: Chordata
- Class: Actinopterygii
- Division: Teleostei
- Order: Acanthuriformes
- Family: Scatophagidae
- Genus: Scatophagus
- Species: S. argus

Binomial name
- Scatophagus argus (Linnaeus, 1766)

Synonyms
- List: Ephippus argus (Linnaeus, 1766); Chaetodon pairatalis Hamilton, 1822; Chaetodon atromaculatus Bennett, 1830; Scatophagus bougainvillii Cuvier, 1831; Scatophagus ornatus Cuvier, 1831; Scatophagus purpurascens Cuvier, 1831; Sargus maculatus Gronow, 1854; Scatophagus maculatus (Gronow, 1854); Scatophagus quadratus De Vis, 1882; Scatophagus aetatevarians De Vis, 1884

= Scatophagus argus =

Spotted scat

Species of fish

Scatophagus argus, the spotted scat, butterfish, mia mia, spotted butterfish, argusfish or tiger scat, is a species of fish in the scat family Scatophagidae. It occurs in two basic color morphs which are called green scat and ruby or red scat. This fish is generally distributed around the Indo-Pacific region, to Japan, New Guinea, and southeastern Australia. They live in coastal muddy areas, including estuaries, mangroves, harbours, and the lower courses of rivers. They are popular aquarium fish.

== Taxonomy ==
Scatophagus argus was first formally described in 1766 as Chaetodon argus by Carl Linnaeus with the type locality given as India. In 1831 Georges Cuvier described the genus Scatophagus and Linnaeus's C. argus was designated as its type species.

=== Etymology ===
The specific name argus refers to the mythical hundred-eyed guardian of Io, Argus, who following his death had his eyes became the feathers of a peacock, a reference to the brown to reddish-brown spots on the body of this fish.

== Distribution ==
Scatophagus argus has a wide Indo-Pacific range. It is found from the Persian Gulf, along the south Asian coast into the western Pacific. It occurs as far north as Japan south to New South Wales, New Caledonia, and Fiji. It has also been recorded from French Polynesia.

A small population was probably established in the Mediterranean Sea around Malta after a first report in 2007 (probably as a result of released aquarium fishes).

== Habitat ==
This is a species of sheltered, shallow coastal waters such as estuaries, harbours, mangrove pools, and the lower parts of fresh water streams, particularly where there are high mineral concentrations. The very small juveniles float within the surface film of the water.

== Description ==
Juvenile

Scatophagus argus has been recorded growing up to a total length of 38 cm (15 in). The body is rectangular and strongly compressed with the head having a steep dorsal profile. It has a moderately large eye which has a diameter noticeably smaller than the length of the rounded, snout. They have a small, horizontal mouth which is not protractile. There are a number of rows of small bristle-like teeth in the jaws. The dorsal fin has 10–11 spines and 16–18 soft rays, while the anal fin has 4 spines and 13–15 soft rays. Spines and rays of the dorsal fin are separated by a deep notch and the first spine in the dorsal fin lies flat. The rear margins of soft parts of the dorsal and anal fins is roughly vertical. The caudal fin is rounded in juveniles and truncate to weakly emarginate adults.

Closeup of the venomous dorsal spines. Envenomation by the dorsal, pelvic, and anal spines causes excruciating pain.

Small ctenoid scales cover the body. The body is greenish-brown to silvery with many brown to red-brown spots. Juveniles are a greenish-brown with either a few large, dark, rounded blotches, or five or six dark, vertical bars.

== Biology ==
In Australia (NT)

Scatophagus argus is omnivorous and an indiscriminate eater. In 1992, biologists Barry and Fast reported adult scat from the Philippines were primarily herbivorous, while the juveniles preferred zooplankton. Although scat were named for their purported habit of feeding on offal, the name of the genus Scatophagus means "dung eater". it may be a misnomer as this behaviour has not been confirmed in diet studies. Since spotted scats can live in relatively enclosed waterbodies, as well as quite far upstream in freshwater rivers, they can adapt to varying salinities. As fry, they live in freshwater environments, but as they mature, they move to saltwater environments. They do not live in temperate waters, as they require at least a little warmth between 21 and 28 °C (70 and 82 °F) This species forms schools.

The females attain sexual maturity at around 7–9 months of age and when the weigh 150 g (5.3 oz), whereas the males are sexually mature at a smaller size. In the Philippines, spawning is brought on by the monsoon rains that start in June and July and the increased rainfall brings cooler temperatures, increased river outflows and lower salinities. The eggs are about 0.7 mm (0.028 in) in diameter, they are transparent and have a spherical shape. The larvae take around 20 hours to hatch from fertilisation and on hatching are 1.8 mm (0.071 in) in length. The juveniles pass through a pelagic tholichthys larval stage, like butterflyfishes.

== Utilisation ==
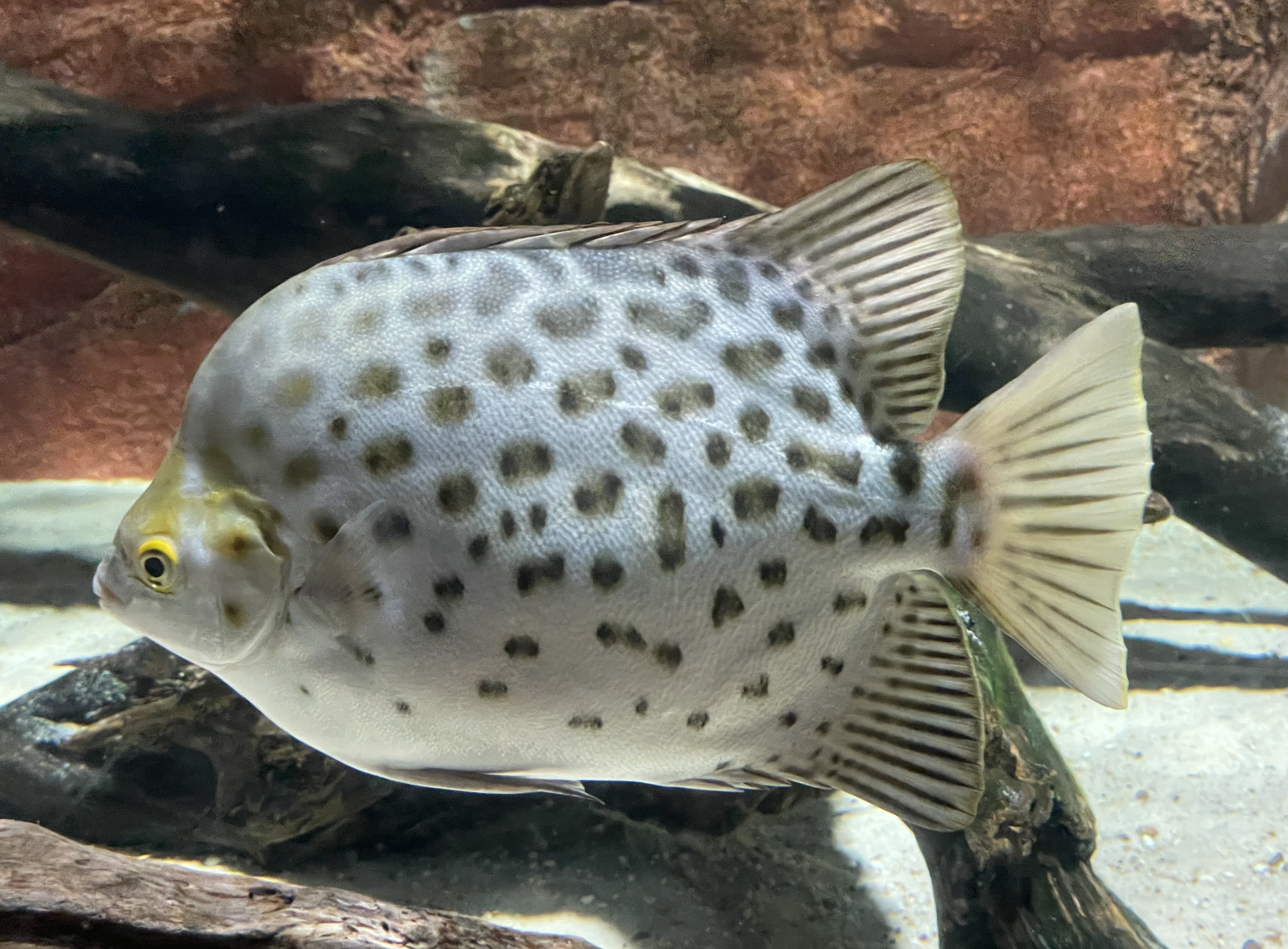
At the Sydney Zoo

Scatophagus argus is fished for and eaten by some people from its original environment, and can sting with small spikes in its anterior parts, inflicting a venom that causes great pain and dizziness. Treatment of the wound is often done by soaking the site of invenomation in hot water. It also appears in the aquarium trade.

== Parasites ==
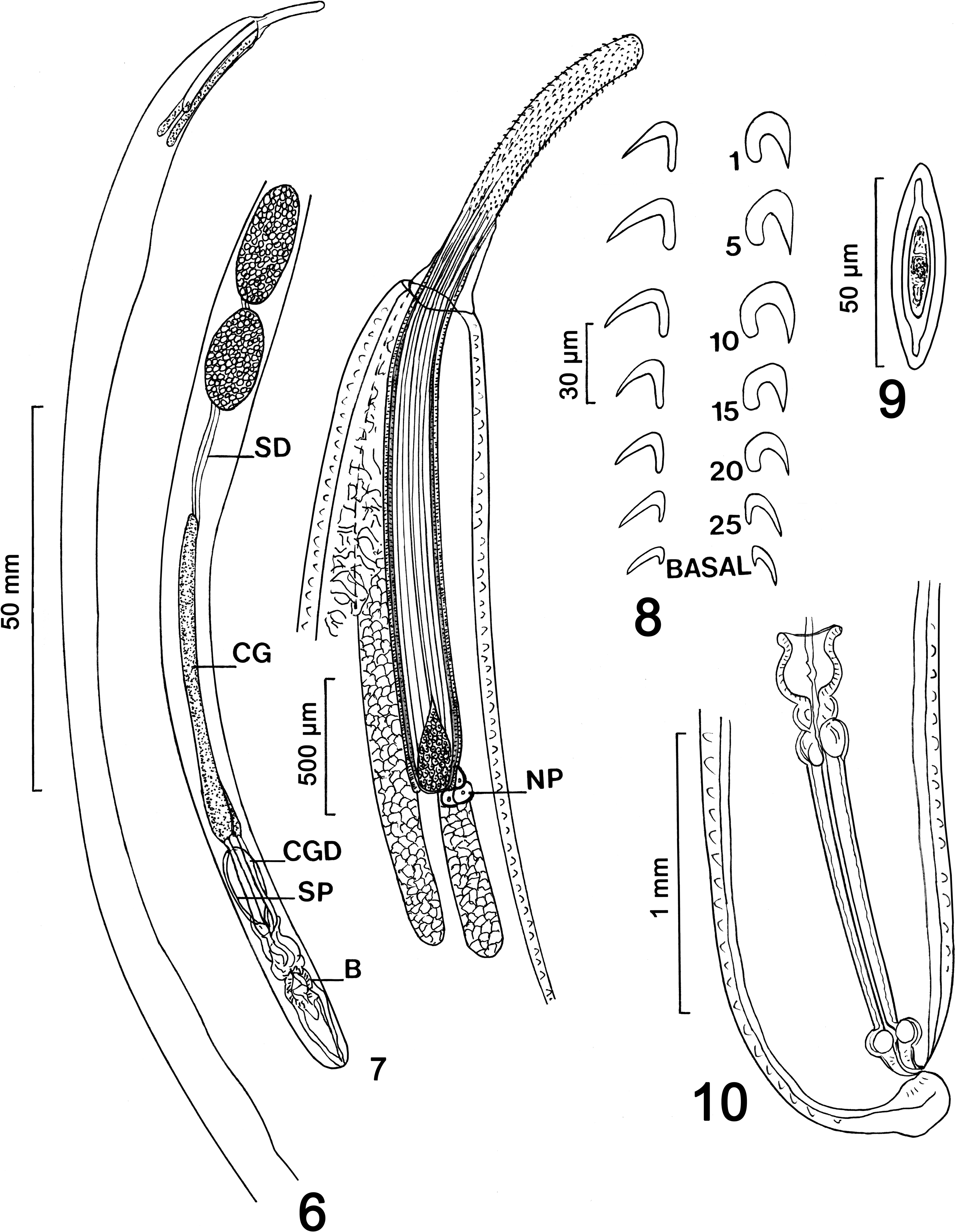
The acanthocephalan worm Pararhadinorhynchus magnus

Scatophagus argus harbors parasites, like most fish. The acanthocephalan worm Pararhadinorhynchus magnus has been described from the intestine of this fish in waters off Vietnam.
