= Squamous part of the frontal bone =

Upper two-thirds of the forward skull

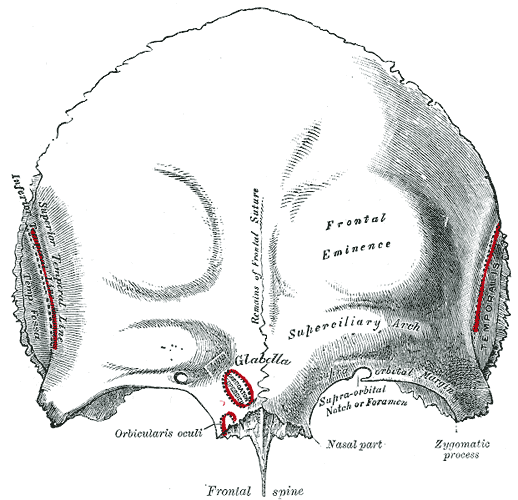
- Frontal bone. Outer surface. (The squamous part is the upper two thirds.)

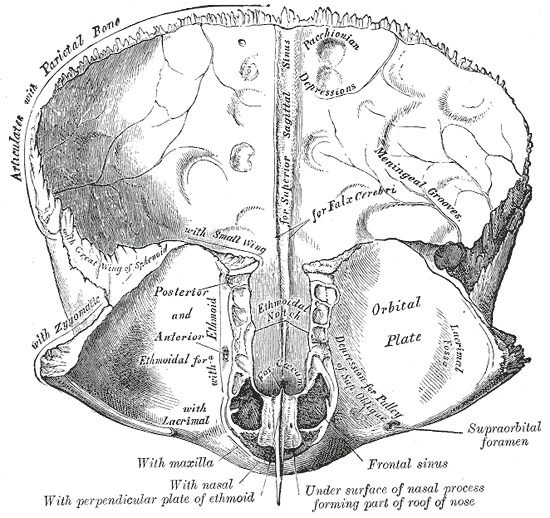
- Frontal bone. Inner surface. (The squamous part is the upper two thirds.)

Details

Identifiers
- Latin: squama frontalis
- TA98: A02.1.03.002
- TA2: 521
- FMA: 52848

The squamous part of the frontal bone is the superior (approximately two thirds) portion when viewed in standard anatomical orientation. There are two surfaces of the squamous part of the frontal bone: the external surface, and the internal surface.

== External surface ==
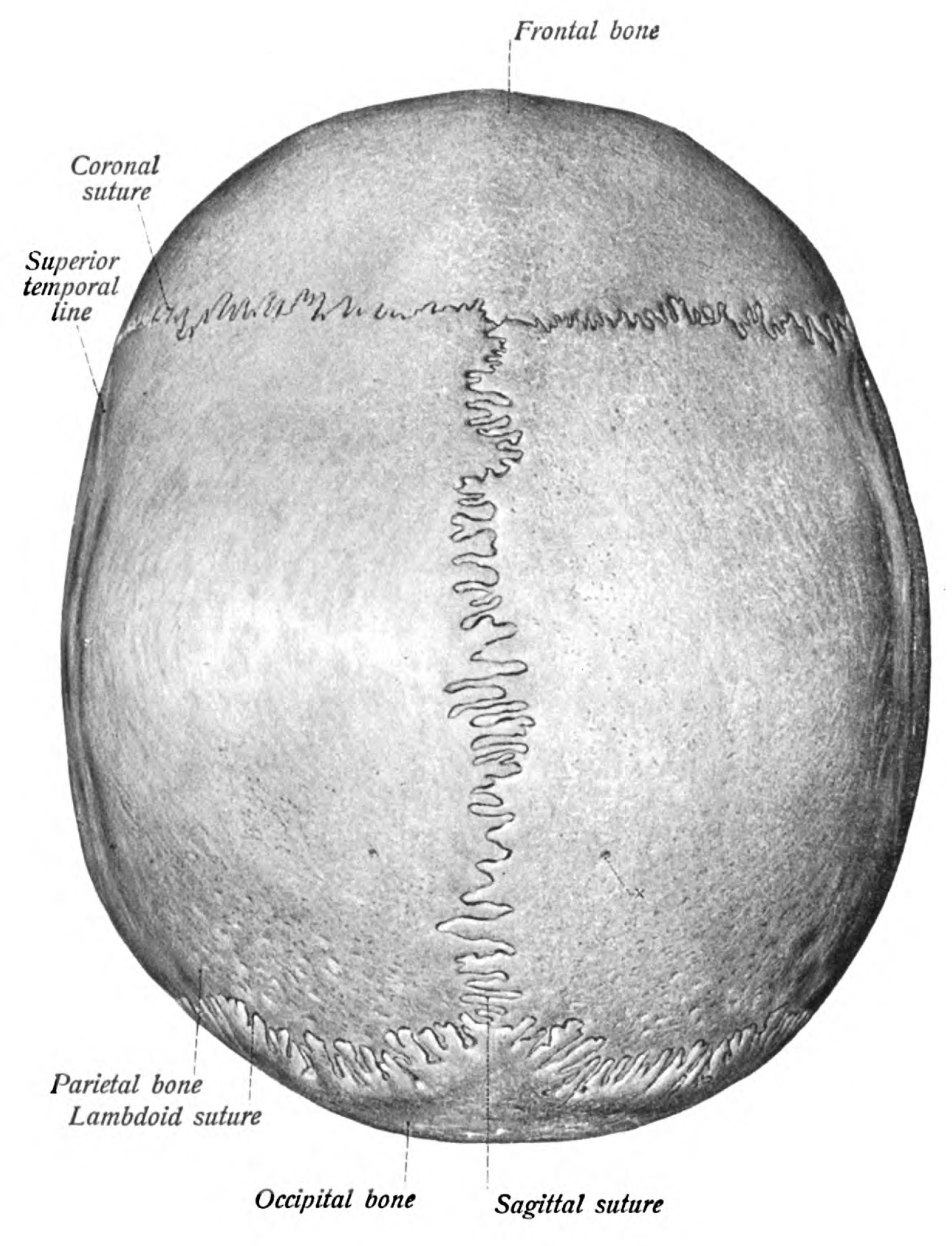
Coronal suture where the squamous part of the frontal bone begins.

The external surface is convex and usually exhibits, in the lower part of the middle line, the remains of the frontal suture; in infancy this suture divides the frontal bone into two and later fuses. A condition where fusion has not taken place, may persist throughout life and is referred to as a metopic suture.

On either side of this suture, about 3 cm. above the supraorbital margin, is a rounded elevation, the frontal eminence (tuber frontale).

These eminences vary in size in different individuals, are occasionally unsymmetrical, and are especially prominent in young skulls; the surface of the bone above them is smooth, and covered by the epicranial aponeurosis.

Below the frontal eminences, and separated from them by a shallow groove, are two arched elevations, the superciliary arches; these are prominent medially, and are joined to one another by a smooth elevation named the glabella. They are larger in the male than in the female, and their degree of prominence depends to some extent on the size of the frontal air sinuses; prominent ridges are, however, occasionally associated with small air sinuses.

Beneath each superciliary arch is a curved and prominent margin, the supraorbital margin, which forms the upper boundary of the base of the orbit, and separates the squamous part from the orbital portion of the bone.

The lateral part of this margin is sharp and prominent, affording to the eye, in that situation, considerable protection from injury; the medial part is rounded.

At the junction of its medial and intermediate thirds is a notch, sometimes converted into a foramen, the supraorbital notch or foramen, which transmits the supraorbital vessels and nerve.

A small aperture in the upper part of the notch transmits a vein from the diploë to join the supraorbital vein.

The supraorbital margin ends laterally in the zygomatic process, which is strong and prominent, and articulates with the zygomatic bone.

Running upward and backward from this process is a well-marked line, the temporal line, which divides into the upper and lower temporal lines, continuous, in the articulated skull, with the corresponding lines on the parietal bone.

The area below and behind the temporal line forms the anterior part of the temporal fossa, and gives origin to the temporalis muscle.

Between the supraorbital margins the squamous part projects downward to a level below that of the zygomatic processes. It meets the nasal bone where it presents a rough, uneven serrated notch known as the nasal notch, and this articulates on either side of the middle line with the nasal bone, and laterally with the frontal process of the maxilla and with the lacrimal. This part is sometimes called the nasal part of frontal bone.

The term nasion is applied to the middle of the frontonasal suture. From the center of the notch the nasal process projects downward and forward beneath the nasal bones and frontal processes of the maxillae, and supports the bridge of the nose.

The nasal process ends below in a sharp spine, and on either side of this is a small grooved surface which enters into the formation of the roof of the corresponding nasal cavity.

The spine forms part of the septum of the nose, articulating in front with the crest of the nasal bones and behind with the perpendicular plate of the ethmoid.

== Internal surface ==
The internal surface of the squamous part is concave and presents in the upper part of the middle line a vertical groove, the sagittal sulcus, the edges of which unite below to form a ridge, the frontal crest; the sulcus lodges the superior sagittal sinus, while its margins and the crest afford attachment to the falx cerebri.

The crest ends below in a small notch which is converted into a foramen, the foramen cecum, by articulation with the ethmoid.

This foramen varies in size in different subjects, and is frequently impervious; when open, it transmits a vein from the nose to the superior sagittal sinus.

On either side of the middle line the bone presents depressions for the convolutions of the brain, and numerous small furrows for the anterior branches of the middle meningeal vessels.

Several small, irregular fossae may also be seen on either side of the sagittal sulcus, for the reception of the arachnoid granulations.
