= Frontal bone =

Bone in the human skull

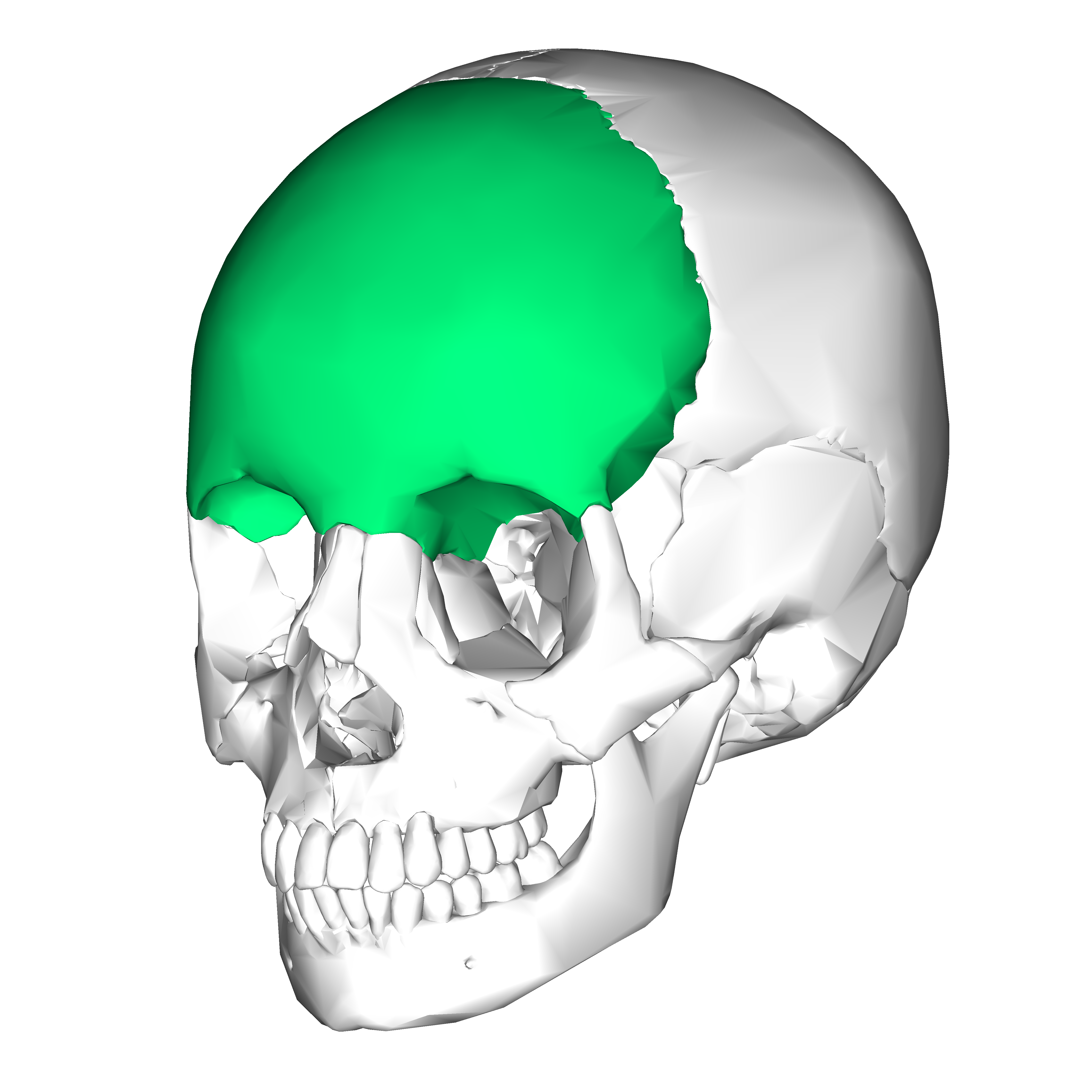
- Position of the frontal bone (highlighted in green)

- Animation of the frontal bone

Details
- Articulations: Twelve bones: the sphenoid, the ethmoid, the two parietals, the two nasals, the two maxillae, the two lacrimals, and the two zygomatics

Identifiers
- Latin: os frontale
- MeSH: D005624
- TA98: A02.1.03.001
- TA2: 520
- FMA: 52734

In the human skull, the frontal bone or sincipital bone is an unpaired bone which consists of two portions. These are the vertically oriented squamous part, and the horizontally oriented orbital part, making up the bony part of the forehead, part of the bony orbital cavity holding the eye, and part of the bony part of the nose respectively. The name comes from the Latin word frons (meaning "forehead").

== Structure ==
The frontal bone is made up of two main parts. These are the squamous part, and the orbital part. The squamous part marks the vertical, flat, and also the biggest part, and the main region of the forehead. The orbital part is the horizontal and second biggest region of the frontal bone. It enters into the formation of the roofs of the orbital and nasal cavities. Sometimes a third part is included as the nasal part of the frontal bone, and sometimes this is included with the squamous part. The nasal part is between the brow ridges, and ends in a serrated nasal notch that articulates with the nasal bones inferiorly, and with the lacrimal and maxilla bones laterally.

== Borders ==
The border of the squamous part is thick, strongly serrated, bevelled at the expense of the inner table above, where it rests upon the parietal bones, and at the expense of the outer table on either side, where it receives the lateral pressure of those bones; this border is continued below into a triangular, rough surface, which articulates with the great wing of the sphenoid. The posterior borders of the orbital plates are thin and serrated, and articulate with the small wings of the sphenoid.

== Development ==
The frontal bone is presumed to be derived from neural crest cells.

The frontal bone is ossified in membrane from two primary centers, one for each half, which appear toward the end of the second month of fetal life, one above each supraorbital margin. From each of these centers, ossification extends upward to form the corresponding half of the squama, and backwards to form the orbital plate. The spine is ossified from a pair of secondary centers, on either side of the middle line; similar centers appear in the nasal part and zygomatic processes.

At birth the bone consists of two pieces, separated by the frontal suture, which is usually obliterated by Intramembranous ossification, except at its lower part, by the eighth year, but occasionally persists throughout life. It is generally maintained that the development of the frontal sinuses begins at the end of the first or beginning of the second year, but may begin at birth. The sinuses are of considerable size by the seventh or eighth year, but do not attain their full proportions until after puberty.

== Other animals ==
In most vertebrates, the frontal bone is paired, rather than presenting the single, fused structure found in humans (see frontal suture). It typically lies on the upper part of the head, between the eyes, but in many non-mammalian animals it does not form part of the orbital cavity. Instead, in reptiles, bony fish and amphibians it is often separated from the orbits by one or two additional bones not found in mammals. These bones, the prefrontals and postfrontals, together form the upper margin of the eye sockets, and lie to either side of the frontal bones.

=== Dinosaurs ===
The frontal bone is one of the principal paired mid-line bones in dinosaur skulls. This bone is part of the skull roof, which is a set of bones that cover the brain, eyes and nostrils. The frontal makes contact with several other bones in the skull. The anterior part of the bone articulates with the nasal bone and the prefrontal bone. The posterior part of the bone articulates with the postorbital bone and the parietal bone. This bone defines all of part of the upper margin of the orbit.

== See also ==
- Frontal eminence
- Frontal lobe
