= Table of cranial nerves =

No.	Name	Sensory, motor, or both	Origin/Target	Exited manner	Function
0	Terminal	?	Lamina terminalis	Located in the cribriform plate of the ethmoid bone.	Animal research indicates that the terminal nerve is involved in the detection of pheromones.
I	Olfactory	Purely sensory	Telencephalon	Located in the olfactory foramina in the cribriform plate of the ethmoid bone.	Transmits the sense of smell from the nasal cavity.
II	Optic	Sensory	Retinal ganglion cells	Located in the optic canal.	Transmits visual signals from the retina of the eye to the brain.
III	Oculomotor	Mainly motor	Anterior aspect of Midbrain	Located in the superior orbital fissure.	Innervates the levator palpebrae superioris, superior rectus, medial rectus, inferior rectus, and inferior oblique, which collectively perform most eye movements. Also innervates the sphincter pupillae and the muscles of the ciliary body.
IV	Trochlear	Motor	Dorsal aspect of Midbrain	Located in the superior orbital fissure.	Innervates the superior oblique muscle, which depresses, abducts, and intorts the eyeball.
V	Trigeminal	Both sensory and motor	Pons	Three Parts: V_{1} (ophthalmic nerve) is located in the superior orbital fissure V_{2} (maxillary nerve) is located in the foramen rotundum V_{3} (mandibular nerve) is located in the foramen ovale.	Receives sensation from the face, mouth and nasal cavity, and innervates the muscles of mastication.
VI	Abducens	Mainly motor	Nuclei lying under the floor of the fourth ventricle Pons	Located in the superior orbital fissure.	Innervates the lateral rectus, which abducts the eye.
VII	Facial	Both sensory and motor	Pons (cerebellopontine angle) above olive	Located in and runs through the internal acoustic canal to the facial canal and exits at the stylomastoid foramen.	Provides motor innervation to the muscles of facial expression, posterior belly of the digastric muscle, stylohyoid muscle, and stapedius muscle. Also receives the special sense of taste from the anterior 2/3 of the tongue and provides secretomotorinnervation to the salivary glands (except parotid) and the lacrimal gland.
VIII	Vestibulocochlear In older texts: auditory, acoustic.	Mostly sensory	Lateral to CN VII (cerebellopontine angle)	Located in the internal acoustic canal.	Mediates sensation of sound, rotation, and gravity (essential for balance and movement). More specifically, the vestibular branch carries impulses for equilibrium and the cochlear branch carries impulses for hearing.
IX	Glossopharyngeal	Both sensory and motor	Medulla	Located in the jugular foramen.	Receives taste from the posterior 1/3 of the tongue, provides secretomotor innervation to the parotid gland, and provides motor innervation to the stylopharyngeus. Some sensation is also relayed to the brain from the palatine tonsils. This nerve is involved together with the vagus nerve in the gag reflex.
X	Vagus	Both sensory and motor	Posterolateral sulcus of Medulla	Located in the jugular foramen.	Supplies branchiomotor innervation to most laryngeal and pharyngeal muscles (except the stylopharyngeus, which is innervated by the glossopharyngeal). Also provides parasympathetic fibers to nearly all thoracic and abdominal viscera down to the splenic flexure. Receives the special sense of taste from the epiglottis. A major function: controls muscles for voice and resonance and the soft palate. Symptoms of damage: dysphagia (swallowing problems), velopharyngeal insufficiency. This nerve is involved (together with nerve IX) in the pharyngeal reflex or gag reflex.
XI	Accessory Sometimes: cranial accessory, spinal accessory.	Mainly motor	Cranial and Spinal Roots	Located in the jugular foramen.	Controls the sternocleidomastoid and trapezius muscles, and overlaps with functions of the vagus nerve (CN X). Symptoms of damage: inability to shrug, weak head movement.
XII	Hypoglossal	Mainly motor	Medulla	Located in the hypoglossal canal.	Provides motor innervation to the muscles of the tongue (except for the palatoglossal muscle, which is innervated by the vagus nerve) and other glossal muscles. Important for swallowing (bolus formation) and speech articulation.

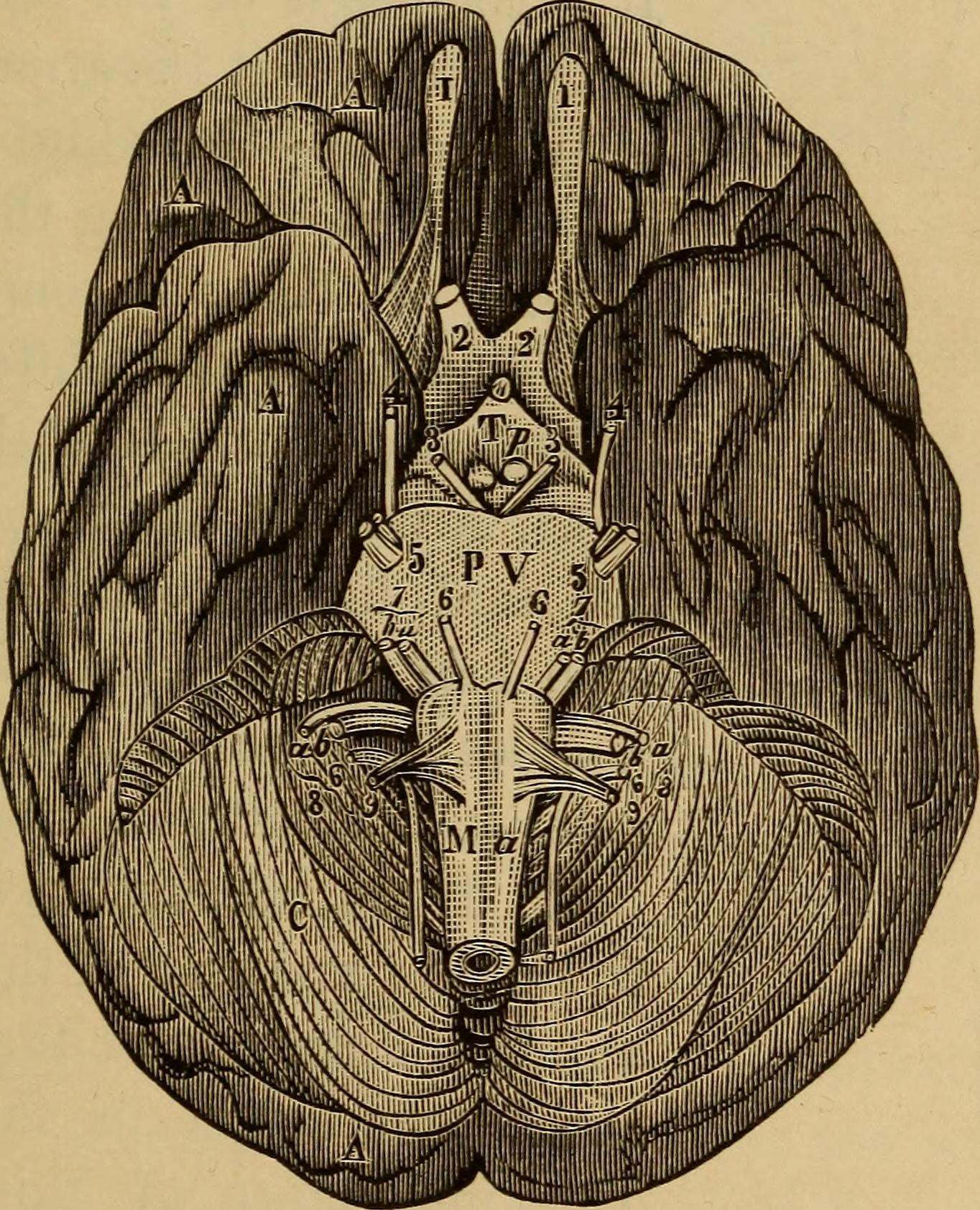
Cranial nerves
