= Schindylesis =

Type of joint

Details

Identifiers
- Latin: schindylesis
- TA98: A03.0.00.014
- TA2: 1527
- FMA: 77244

Schindylesis is an articulation in which two bones are joined by fitting the ridge of one bone into the groove of another. Also known as a "wedge-and-groove" joint, the name is derived from the Greek 'skhindulesis', meaning "to cleave", as in cutting with a stump with an axe.

This fibrous suture joint can be found between the vomer and the perpendicular plate of the ethmoid bone as well as between the vomer and the gap between the maxilla and palatine.
