= Olfactory foramina =

Grouping of holes located on the cribriform plate

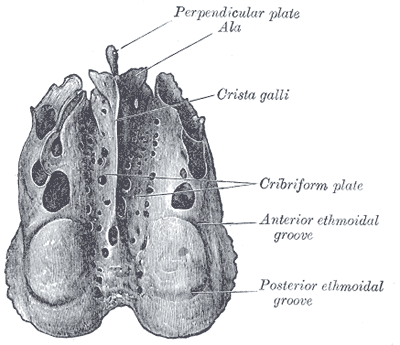
- Ethmoid bone from above.

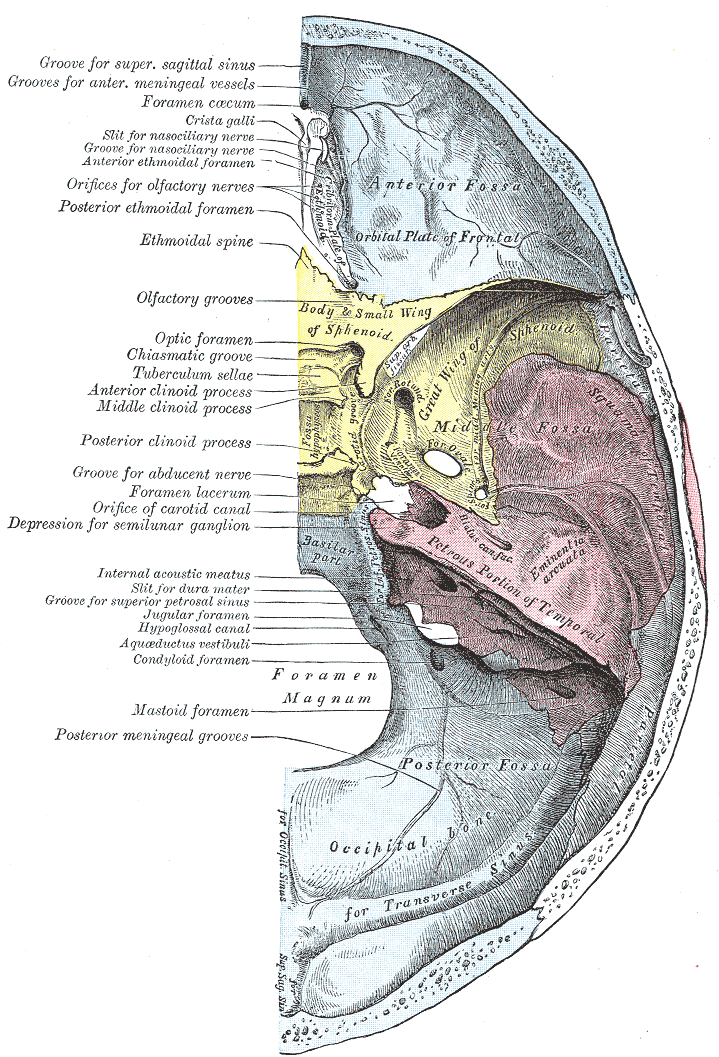
- Base of the skull. Upper surface.

Details

Identifiers
- Latin: foramina cribrosa ossis ethmoidalis
- TA98: A02.1.07.003
- TA2: 723
- FMA: 75353

The olfactory foramina, also known as the cribriform foramina (cribr- is "a sieve" in Greek), is the grouping of holes located on the cribriform plate. The cribriform plate forms the roof of the nasal cavity, and the olfactory foramina are in the two depressions lateral to the median blade of the cribriform plate called the crista galli. There is a pair of olfactory bulbs of the brain that rest in these two depressions. These holes that make up the olfactory foramina allow passage for about 20 bundles of nerve fibers that make up the olfactory nerve, also known as Cranial Nerve I (CNI), from the nasal cavity to meet with the olfactory bulbs. Therefore, the olfactory foramina are necessary for the human sense of smell. These foramina vary in size and number with age.
