= Cranial nerves =

Nerves that emerge directly from the brain

- Left View of the human brain from below, showing origins of cranial nerves. Right Juxtaposed skull base with foramina through which many nerves exit the skull.

- Cranial nerves as they pass through the skull base to the brain

Details

Identifiers
- Latin: nervus cranialis (pl: nervi craniales)
- MeSH: D003391
- TA98: A14.2.01.001; A14.2.00.038
- TA2: 6142, 6178
- FMA: 5865

Cranial nerves are nerves that emerge directly from the brain, including the brainstem, in contrast to spinal nerves, which emerge from segments of the spinal cord. They relay information between the brain and various parts of the body, primarily to the head and neck regions and are responsible for special senses of vision, taste, smell, and hearing.

The cranial nerves emerge from the central nervous system above the level of the first vertebra of the vertebral column. Each cranial nerve is paired and is present on both sides.

There are conventionally twelve pairs of cranial nerves, which are described with Roman numerals I–XII. Some considered there to be thirteen pairs of cranial nerves, including the non-paired terminal nerve. The numbering of the cranial nerves is based on the order in which they emerge from the brain and brainstem, from front to back.

The terminal nerves (0), olfactory nerves (I) and optic nerves (II) emerge from the cerebrum, and the remaining ten pairs arise from the brainstem, which is the lower part of the brain.

The cranial nerves are considered components of the peripheral nervous system (PNS), although on a structural level the olfactory (I), optic (II), and trigeminal (V) nerves are more accurately considered part of the central nervous system (CNS).

== Anatomy ==
Most typically, humans are considered to have twelve pairs of cranial nerves (I–XII), with the terminal nerve (0) more recently canonized. The nerves are: the olfactory nerve (I), the optic nerve (II), oculomotor nerve (III), trochlear nerve (IV), trigeminal nerve (V), abducens nerve (VI), facial nerve (VII), vestibulocochlear nerve (VIII), glossopharyngeal nerve (IX), vagus nerve (X), accessory nerve (XI), and the hypoglossal nerve (XII).

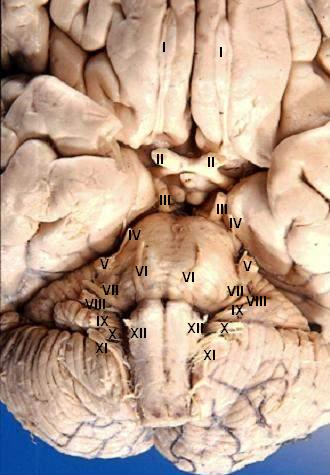
View of the human brain from below showing the cranial nerves on an autopsy specimen

View from below of the brain and brainstem showing the cranial nerves, numbered from olfactory to hypoglossal after the order in which they emerge

The brainstem, with cranial nerve nuclei and tracts shown in red

=== Terminology ===
Cranial nerves are generally named according to their structure or function. For example, the olfactory nerve (I) supplies smell, and the facial nerve (VII) supplies the muscles of the face. Because Latin was the lingua franca of the study of anatomy when the nerves were first documented, recorded, and discussed, many nerves maintain Latin or Greek names, including the trochlear nerve (IV), named according to its structure, as it supplies a muscle that attaches to a pulley (Greek: trochlea). The trigeminal nerve (V) is named in accordance with its three components (Latin: trigeminus meaning triplets), and the vagus nerve (X) is named for its wandering course (Latin: vagus).

Cranial nerves are numbered based on their position from front to back (rostral-caudal) of their position on the brain, as, when viewing the forebrain and brainstem from below, they are often visible in their numeric order. For example, the olfactory nerves (I) and optic nerves (II) arise from the base of the forebrain, and the other nerves, III to XII, arise from the brainstem.

Cranial nerves have paths within and outside the skull. The paths within the skull are called "intracranial" and the paths outside the skull are called "extracranial". There are many holes in the skull called "foramina" by which the nerves can exit the skull. All cranial nerves are paired, which means they occur on both the right and left sides of the body. The muscle, skin, or additional function supplied by a nerve, on the same side of the body as the side it originates from, is an ipsilateral function. If the function is on the opposite side to the origin of the nerve, this is known as a contralateral function.

=== Intracranial course ===
==== Nuclei ====
Grossly, all cranial nerves have a nucleus. With the exception of the olfactory nerve (I) and optic nerve (II), all the nuclei are present in the brainstem.

The midbrain has the nuclei of the oculomotor nerve (III) and trochlear nerve (IV); the pons has the nuclei of the trigeminal nerve (V), abducens nerve (VI), facial nerve (VII) and vestibulocochlear nerve (VIII); and the medulla has the nuclei of the glossopharyngeal nerve (IX), vagus nerve (X), accessory nerve (XI) and hypoglossal nerve (XII). The olfactory nerve (I) emerges from the olfactory bulb, and depending slightly on division the optic nerve (II) is considered to emerge from the lateral geniculate nuclei.

Because each nerve may have several functions, the nerve fibres that make up the nerve may collect in more than one nucleus. For example, the trigeminal nerve (V), which has a sensory and a motor role, has at least four nuclei.

==== Exiting the brainstem ====
With the exception of the olfactory nerve (I) and optic nerve (II), the cranial nerves emerge from the brainstem. The oculomotor nerve (III) and trochlear nerve (IV) emerge from the midbrain, the trigeminal (V), abducens (VI), facial (VII) and vestibulocochlear (VIII) from the pons, and the glossopharyngeal (IX), vagus (X), accessory (XI) and hypoglossal (XII) emerge from the medulla.

The olfactory nerve (I) and optic nerve (II) emerge separately. The olfactory nerves emerge from the olfactory bulbs on either side of the crista galli, a bony projection below the frontal lobe, and the optic nerves (II) emerge from the lateral colliculus, swellings on either side of the temporal lobes of the brain.

==== Ganglia ====
The cranial nerves give rise to a number of ganglia, collections of the cell bodies of neurons in the nerves that are outside of the brain. These ganglia are both parasympathetic and sensory ganglia.

The sensory ganglia of the cranial nerves, directly correspond to the dorsal root ganglia of spinal nerves and are known as cranial nerve ganglia. Sensory ganglia exist for nerves with sensory function: V, VII, VIII, IX, X. There are also a number of parasympathetic cranial nerve ganglia. Sympathetic ganglia supplying the head and neck reside in the upper regions of the sympathetic trunk, and do not belong to the cranial nerves.

The ganglion of the sensory nerves, which are similar in structure to the dorsal root ganglion of the spinal cord, include:

- The trigeminal ganglia of the trigeminal nerve (V), which occupies a space in the dura mater called Meckel's cave. This ganglion contains only the sensory fibres of the trigeminal nerve.
- The geniculate ganglion of the facial nerve (VII), which occurs just after the nerve enters the facial canal.
- A superior and inferior ganglia of the glossopharyngeal nerve (IX), which occurs just after it passes through the jugular foramen.

Additional ganglia for nerves with parasympathetic function exist, and include the ciliary ganglion of the oculomotor nerve (III), the pterygopalatine ganglion of the maxillary nerve (V2), the submandibular ganglion of the lingual nerve, a branch of the facial nerve (VII), and the otic ganglion of the glossopharyngeal nerve (IX).

==== Exiting the skull and extracranial course ====
Exits of cranial nerves from the skull.
Location	Nerve
cribriform plate	Terminal nerve (0)
cribriform plate	Olfactory nerve (I)
optic foramen	Optic nerve (II)
superior orbital fissure	Oculomotor (III); Trochlear (IV); Abducens (VI); Trigeminal V1 (ophthalmic)
foramen rotundum	Trigeminal V2 (maxillary)
foramen ovale	Trigeminal V3 (mandibular)
stylomastoid foramen	Facial nerve (VII)
internal auditory canal	Vestibulocochlear (VIII)
jugular foramen	Glossopharyngeal (IX); Vagus (X); Accessory (XI)
hypoglossal canal	Hypoglossal (XII)

After emerging from the brain, the cranial nerves travel within the skull, and some must leave it in order to reach their destinations. Often the nerves pass through holes in the skull, called foramina, as they travel to their destinations. Other nerves pass through bony canals, longer pathways enclosed by bone. These foramina and canals may contain more than one cranial nerve and may also contain blood vessels.

- The terminal nerve (0) is a thin network of fibers associated with the dura and lamina terminalis running rostral to the olfactory nerve, with projections through the cribriform plate.
- The olfactory nerve (I) passes through perforations in the cribriform plate part of the ethmoid bone. The nerve fibres end in the upper nasal cavity.
- The optic nerve (II) passes through the optic foramen in the sphenoid bone as it travels to the eye.
- The oculomotor nerve (III), trochlear nerve (IV), abducens nerve (VI) and the ophthalmic branch of the trigeminal nerve (V1) travel through the cavernous sinus into the superior orbital fissure, passing out of the skull into the orbit.
- The maxillary division of the trigeminal nerve (V2) passes through foramen rotundum in the sphenoid bone.
- The mandibular division of the trigeminal nerve (V3) passes through foramen ovale of the sphenoid bone.
- The facial nerve (VII) and vestibulocochlear nerve (VIII) both enter the internal auditory canal in the temporal bone. The facial nerve then reaches the side of the face by using the stylomastoid foramen, also in the temporal bone. Its fibers then spread out to reach and control all of the muscles of facial expression. The vestibulocochlear nerve reaches the organs that control balance and hearing in the temporal bone and therefore does not reach the external surface of the skull.
- The glossopharyngeal (IX), vagus (X) and accessory nerve (XI) all leave the skull via the jugular foramen to enter the neck. The glossopharyngeal nerve provides sensation to the upper throat and the back of the tongue, the vagus supplies the muscles in the larynx and continues downward to supply parasympathetic supply to the chest and abdomen. The accessory nerve controls the trapezius and sternocleidomastoid muscles in the neck and shoulder.
- Schematic 3D model of the cranial nerves
  The hypoglossal nerve (XII) exits the skull using the hypoglossal canal in the occipital bone.

== Development ==
The cranial nerves are formed from the contribution of two specialized embryonic cell populations, cranial neural crest and ectodermal placodes. The components of the sensory nervous system of the head are derived from the neural crest and from an embryonic cell population developing in close proximity, the cranial sensory placodes (the olfactory, lens, otic, trigeminal, epibranchial and paratympanic placodes). The dual origin cranial nerves are summarized in the following table:

Contributions of neural crest cells and placodes to ganglia and cranial nerves

Cranial nerve	Ganglion and type	Origin of neurons
CNI – olfactory (Ensheating glia of olfactory nerves)		Telencephalon/olfactory placode; NCCs at forebrain
CNIII – oculomotor (m)	Ciliary, visceral efferent	NCCs at forebrain-midbrain junction (caudal diencephalon and the anterior mesencephalon)
CNV – trigeminal (mix)	Trigeminal, general afferent	NCCs at forebrain-midbrain junction (from r2 into 1st PA), trigeminal placode
CNVII – facial (mix)	-Superior, general and special afferent -Inferior: geniculate, general and special afferent -Sphenopalatine, visceral efferent -Submandibular, visceral efferent	-Hindbrain NCCs (from r4 into 2^{nd} PA), 1st epibranchial placode -1st epibranchial placode (geniculate) -Hindbrain NCCs (2nd PA) -Hindbrain NCCs (2nd PA)
CNVIII – Vestibulocochlear (s)	-Acoustic: cochlear, special afferent; and vestibular, special afferent	-Otic placode and hindbrain (from r4) NCCs
CNIX – glossopharyngeal (mix)	-Superior, general and special afferent -Inferior, petrosal, general and special afferent -Otic, visceral efferent	-Hindbrain NCCs (from r6 into 3^{rd} PA) -2nd epibranchial placode (petrosal) -Hindbrain NCCs (from r6 into 3rd PA)
CNX – vagus (mix) Superior laryngeal branch; and recurrent laryngeal branch	-Superior, general afferent -Inferior: nodose, general and special afferent -Vagal: parasympathetic, visceral efferent	-Hindbrain NCCs (from r7-r8 to 4^{th} & 6th PA) -Hindbrain NCCs (4th& 6th PA); 3rd (nodose) and 4th epibranchial placodes -Hindbrain NCCs (4th & 6th PA)
CNXI – accessory (m)	No ganglion *	Hindbrain (from r7-r8 to PA 4); NCCs (4th PA)

Abbreviations: CN, cranial nerve; m, purely motor nerve; mix, mixed nerve (sensory and motor); NC, neural crest; PA, pharyngeal (branchial) arch; r, rhombomere; s, purely sensory nerve. * There is no known ganglion of the accessory nerve. The cranial part of the accessory nerve sends occasional branches to the superior ganglion of the vagus nerve.

== Function ==
The cranial nerves provide motor and sensory supply mainly to the structures within the head and neck. The sensory supply includes both "general" sensation such as temperature and touch, and "special" senses such as taste, vision, smell, balance and hearing. The vagus nerve (X) provides sensory and autonomic (parasympathetic) supply to structures in the neck and also to most of the organs in the chest and abdomen.

=== Terminal nerve (0) ===
The terminal nerve (0) may not have a role in humans, although it has been implicated in hormonal responses to smell, sexual response and mate selection.

=== Smell (I) ===
The olfactory nerve (I) conveys information giving rise to the sense of smell.

Damage to the olfactory nerve (I) can cause an inability to smell (anosmia), a distortion in the sense of smell (parosmia), or a distortion or lack of taste.

=== Vision (II) ===
The optic nerve (II) transmits visual information.

Damage to the optic nerve (II) affects specific aspects of vision that depend on the location of the damage. A person may not be able to see objects on their left or right sides (homonymous hemianopsia), or may have difficulty seeing objects from their outer visual fields (bitemporal hemianopsia) if the optic chiasm is involved. Inflammation (optic neuritis) may impact the sharpness of vision or color detection

=== Eye movement (III, IV, VI) ===
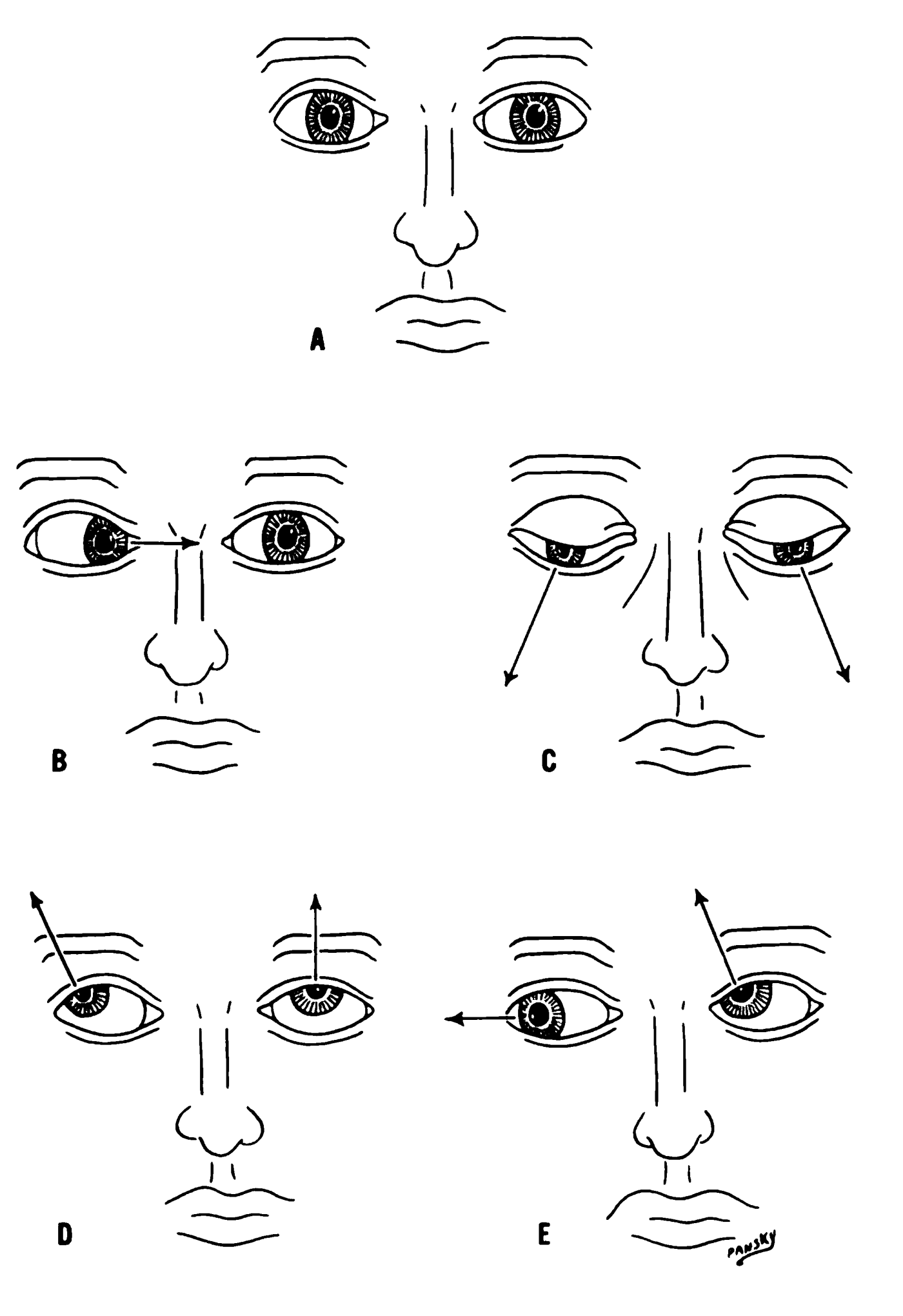
The oculomotor (III), troclear (IV) and abducens (VI) nerves supply the muscle of the eye. Damage will affect the movement of the eye in various ways, shown here.

The oculomotor nerve (III), trochlear nerve (IV) and abducens nerve (VI) coordinate eye movement. The oculomotor nerve (III) controls all muscles of the eye except for the superior oblique muscle controlled by the trochlear nerve (IV), and the lateral rectus muscle controlled by the abducens nerve (VI). This means the ability of the eye to look down and inwards is controlled by the trochlear nerve (IV), the ability to look outwards is controlled by the abducens nerve (VI), and all other movements are controlled by the oculomotor nerve (III)

Damage to these nerves may affect the movement of the eye. Damage may result in double vision (diplopia) because the movements of the eyes are not synchronized. Abnormalities of visual movement may also be seen on examination, such as jittering (nystagmus).

Damage to the oculomotor nerve (III) can cause double vision and inability to coordinate the movements of both eyes (strabismus), also eyelid drooping (ptosis) and pupil dilation (mydriasis). Lesions may also lead to inability to open the eye due to paralysis of the levator palpebrae muscle. Individuals suffering from a lesion to the oculomotor nerve, may compensate by tilting their heads to alleviate symptoms due to paralysis of one or more of the eye muscles it controls.

Damage to the trochlear nerve (IV) can also cause double vision with the eye adducted and elevated. The result will be an eye which can not move downwards properly (especially downwards when in an inward position). This is due to impairment in the superior oblique muscle.

Damage to the abducens nerve (VI) can also result in double vision. This is due to impairment in the lateral rectus muscle, supplied by the abducens nerve.

=== Trigeminal nerve (V) ===
The trigeminal nerve (V) and its three main branches the ophthalmic (V1), maxillary (V2), and mandibular (V3) provide sensation to the skin of the face and also controls the muscles of chewing.

Damage to the trigeminal nerve leads to loss of sensation in an affected area. Other conditions affecting the trigeminal nerve (V) include trigeminal neuralgia, herpes zoster, sinusitis pain, presence of a dental abscess, and cluster headaches.

The facial nerve (VII) supplies the muscles of facial expression. Damage to the nerve causes a lack of muscle tone on the affected side, as can be seen on the right side of the face here.

=== Facial expression (VII) ===
The facial nerve (VII) controls most muscles of facial expression, supplies the sensation of taste from the front two-thirds of the tongue, and controls the stapedius muscle. Most muscles are supplied by the cortex on the opposite side of the brain; the exception is the frontalis muscle of the forehead, in which the left and the right side of the muscle both receive inputs from both sides of the brain.

Damage to the facial nerve (VII) may cause facial palsy. This is where a person is unable to move the muscles on one or both sides of their face. The most common cause of this is Bell's palsy, the ultimate cause of which is unknown. Patients with Bell's palsy often have a drooping mouth on the affected side and often have trouble chewing because the buccinator muscle is affected. The facial nerve is also the most commonly affected cranial nerve in blunt trauma.

=== Hearing and balance (VIII) ===
The vestibulocochlear nerve (VIII) supplies information relating to balance and hearing via its two branches, the vestibular and cochlear nerves. The vestibular part is responsible for supplying sensation from the vestibules and semicircular canal of the inner ear, including information about balance, and is an important component of the vestibuloocular reflex, which keeps the head stable and allows the eyes to track moving objects. The cochlear nerve transmits information from the cochlea, allowing sound to be heard.

When damaged, the vestibular nerve may give rise to the sensation of spinning and dizziness (vertigo). Function of the vestibular nerve may be tested by putting cold and warm water in the ears and watching eye movements caloric stimulation. Damage to the vestibulocochlear nerve can also present as repetitive and involuntary eye movements (nystagmus), particularly when the eye is moving horizontally. Damage to the cochlear nerve will cause partial or complete deafness in the affected ear.

=== Oral sensation, taste, and salivation (IX) ===
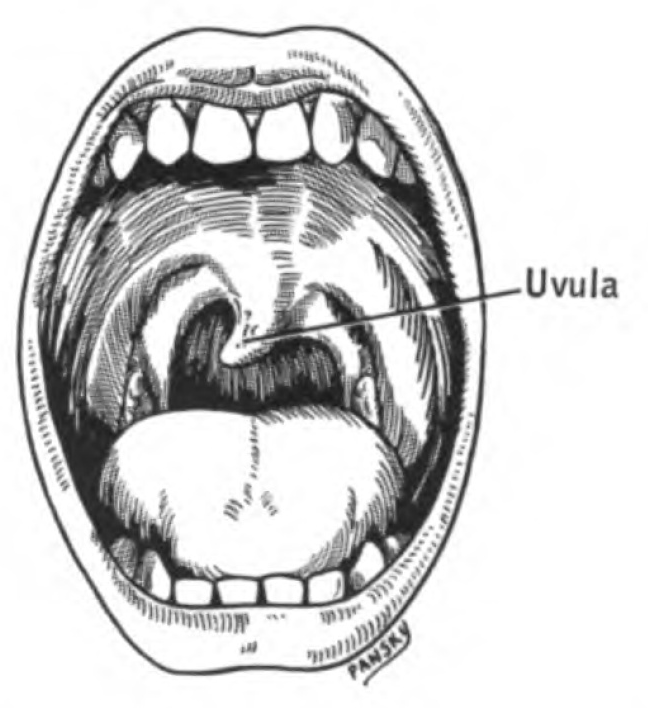
A damaged glossopharyngeal nerve (IX) may cause the uvula to deviate to the affected side.

The glossopharyngeal nerve (IX) supplies the stylopharyngeus muscle and provides sensation to the oropharynx and back of the tongue. The glossopharyngeal nerve also provides parasympathetic input to the parotid gland.

Damage to the nerve may cause failure of the gag reflex; a failure may also be seen in damage to the vagus nerve (X).

=== Vagus nerve (X) ===
The vagus nerve (X) provides sensory and parasympathetic supply to structures in the neck and also to most of the organs in the chest and abdomen.

Loss of function of the vagus nerve (X) will lead to a loss of parasympathetic supply to a very large number of structures. Major effects of damage to the vagus nerve may include a rise in blood pressure and heart rate. Isolated dysfunction of only the vagus nerve is rare, but – if the lesion is located above the point at which the vagus first branches off – can be indicated by a hoarse voice, due to dysfunction of one of its branches, the recurrent laryngeal nerve.

Damage to this nerve may result in difficulties swallowing.

=== Shoulder elevation and head-turning (XI) ===
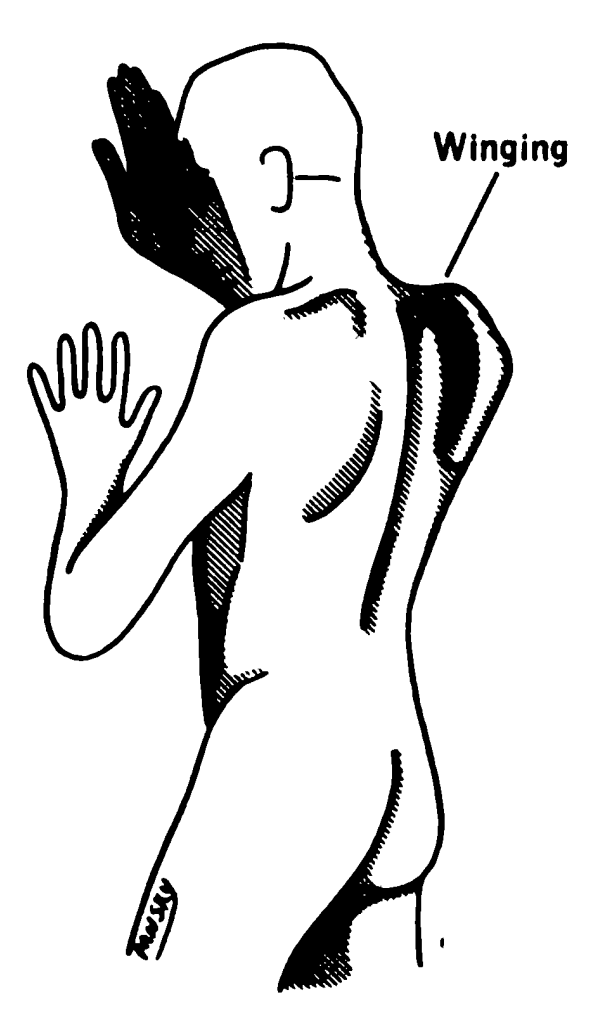
The accessory nerve (XI) supplies the sternocleidomastoid and trapezius muscles. Damage to the nerve may cause a winged scapula, shown here.

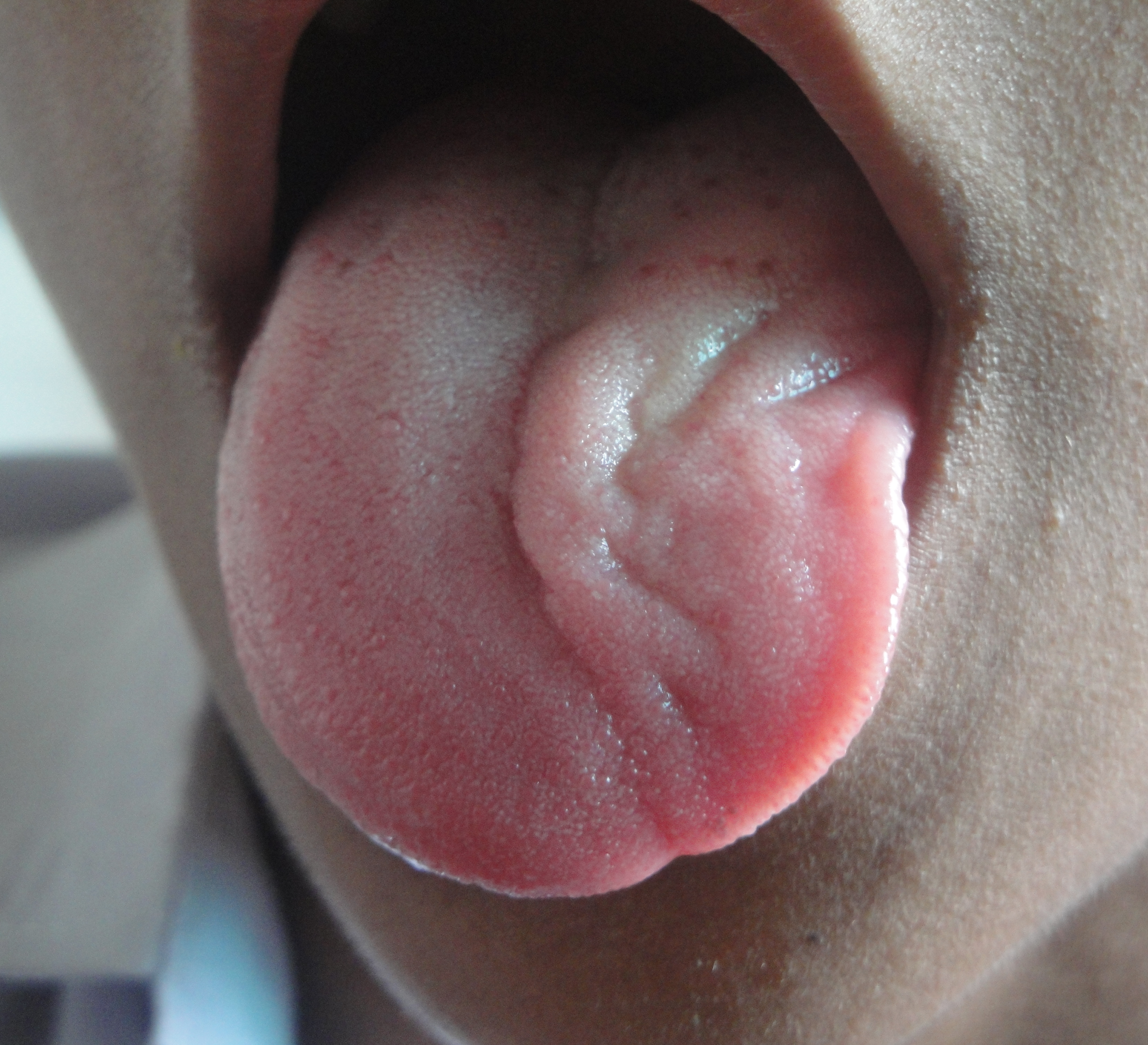
The hypoglossal nerve (XII) supplies the muscles of the tongue. A damaged hypoglossal nerve will result in an inability to stick the tongue out straight; here seen in an injury resulting from branchial cyst surgery.

The accessory nerve (XI) supplies the sternocleidomastoid and trapezius muscles.

Damage to the accessory nerve (XI) will lead to weakness in the trapezius muscle on the same side as the damage. The trapezius lifts the shoulder when shrugging, so the affected shoulder will not be able to shrug and the shoulder blade (scapula) will protrude into a winged position. Depending on the location of the lesion there may also be weakness present in the sternocleidomastoid muscle, which acts to turn the head so that the face points to the opposite side.

=== Tongue movement (XII) ===
The hypoglossal nerve (XII) supplies the intrinsic muscles of the tongue, controlling tongue movement. The hypoglossal nerve (XII) is unique in that it is supplied by the motor cortices of both hemispheres of the brain.

Damage to the nerve may lead to fasciculations or wasting (atrophy) of the muscles of the tongue. This will lead to weakness of tongue movement on that side. When damaged and extended, the tongue will move towards the weaker or damaged side, as shown in the image. The fasciculations of the tongue are sometimes said to look like a "bag of worms". Damage to the nerve tract or nucleus will not lead to atrophy or fasciculations, but only weakness of the muscles on the same side as the damage.

== Clinical significance ==
=== Examination ===
Doctors, neurologists and other medical professionals may conduct a cranial nerve examination as part of a neurological examination to examine the cranial nerves. This is a highly formalised series of steps involving specific tests for each nerve. Dysfunction of a nerve identified during testing may point to a problem with the nerve or of a part of the brain.

A cranial nerve exam starts with observation of the patient, as some cranial nerve lesions may affect the symmetry of the eyes or face. Vision may be tested by examining the visual fields, or by examining the retina with an ophthalmoscope, using a process known as funduscopy. Visual field testing may be used to pin-point structural lesions in the optic nerve, or further along the visual pathways. Eye movement is tested and abnormalities such as nystagmus are observed for. The sensation of the face is tested, and patients are asked to perform different facial movements, such as puffing out of the cheeks. Hearing is checked by voice and tuning forks. The patient's uvula is examined. After performing a shrug and head turn, the patient's tongue function is assessed by various tongue movements.

Smell is not routinely tested, but if there is suspicion of a change in the sense of smell, each nostril is tested with substances of known odors such as coffee or soap. Intensely smelling substances, for example ammonia, may lead to the activation of pain receptors of the trigeminal nerve (V) located in the nasal cavity and this can confound olfactory testing.

=== Damage ===
==== Compression ====
Nerves may be compressed because of increased intracranial pressure, a mass effect of an intracerebral haemorrhage, or tumour that presses against the nerves and interferes with the transmission of impulses along the nerve. Loss of function of a cranial nerve may sometimes be the first symptom of an intracranial or skull base cancer.

An increase in intracranial pressure may lead to impairment of the optic nerves (II) due to compression of the surrounding veins and capillaries, causing swelling of the eyeball (papilloedema). A cancer, such as an optic nerve glioma, may also impact the optic nerve (II). A pituitary tumour may compress the optic tracts or the optic chiasm of the optic nerve (II), leading to visual field loss. A pituitary tumour may also extend into the cavernous sinus, compressing the oculomotor nerve (III), trochlear nerve (IV) and abducens nerve (VI), leading to double-vision and strabismus. These nerves may also be affected by herniation of the temporal lobes of the brain through the falx cerebri.

The cause of trigeminal neuralgia, in which one side of the face is exquisitely painful, is thought to be compression of the nerve by an artery as the nerve emerges from the brain stem. An acoustic neuroma, particularly at the junction between the pons and medulla, may compress the facial nerve (VII) and vestibulocochlear nerve (VIII), leading to hearing and sensory loss on the affected side.

==== Stroke ====
Occlusion of blood vessels that supply the nerves or their nuclei, an ischemic stroke, may cause specific signs and symptoms relating to the damaged area. If there is a stroke of the midbrain, pons or medulla, various cranial nerves may be damaged, resulting in dysfunction and symptoms of a number of different syndromes. Thrombosis, such as a cavernous sinus thrombosis, refers to a clot (thrombus) affecting the venous drainage from the cavernous sinus, affects the optic (II), oculomotor (III), trochlear (IV), ophthalmic branch of the trigeminal nerve (V1) and the abducens nerve (VI).

==== Inflammation ====
Inflammation of a cranial nerve can occur as a result of infection, such as viral causes like reactivated herpes simplex virus, or can occur spontaneously. Inflammation of the facial nerve (VII) may result in Bell's palsy.

Multiple sclerosis, an inflammatory process resulting in a loss of the myelin sheathes which surround the cranial nerves, may cause a variety of shifting symptoms affecting multiple cranial nerves. Inflammation may also affect other cranial nerves. Other rarer inflammatory causes affecting the function of multiple cranial nerves include sarcoidosis, miliary tuberculosis, and inflammation of arteries, such as granulomatosis with polyangiitis.

==== Other ====
Trauma to the skull, disease of bone, such as Paget's disease, and injury to nerves during surgery are other causes of nerve damage.

== History ==
The Graeco-Roman anatomist Galen (AD 129–210) named seven pairs of cranial nerves. Much later, in 1664, English anatomist Sir Thomas Willis suggested that there were actually 9 pairs of nerves. Finally, in 1778, German anatomist Samuel Soemmering named the 12 pairs of nerves that are generally accepted today. However, because many of the nerves emerge from the brain stem as rootlets, there is continual debate as to how many nerves there actually are, and how they should be grouped. For example, there is reason to consider both the olfactory (I) and optic (II) nerves to be brain tracts, rather than cranial nerves.

== Other animals ==
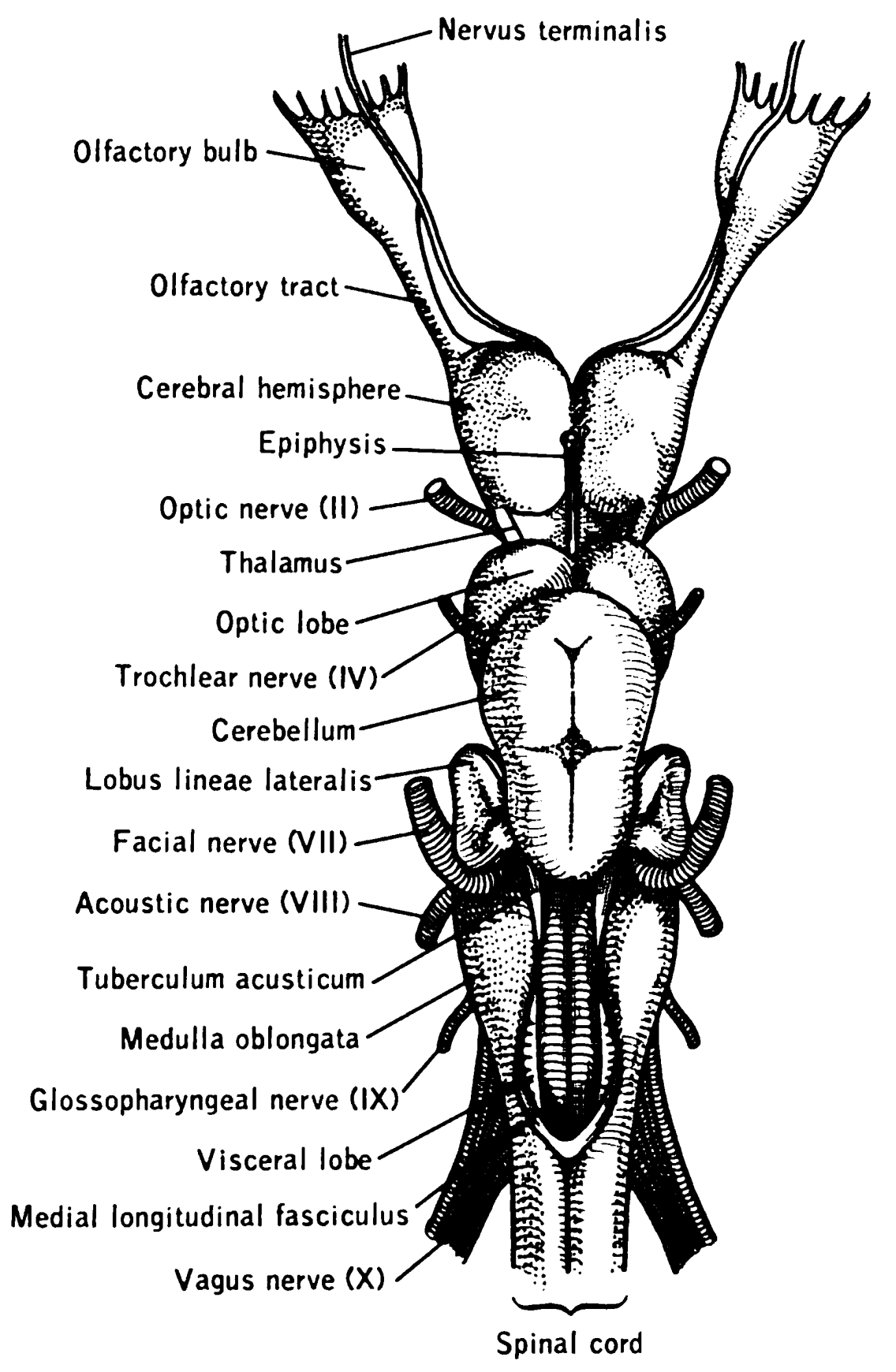
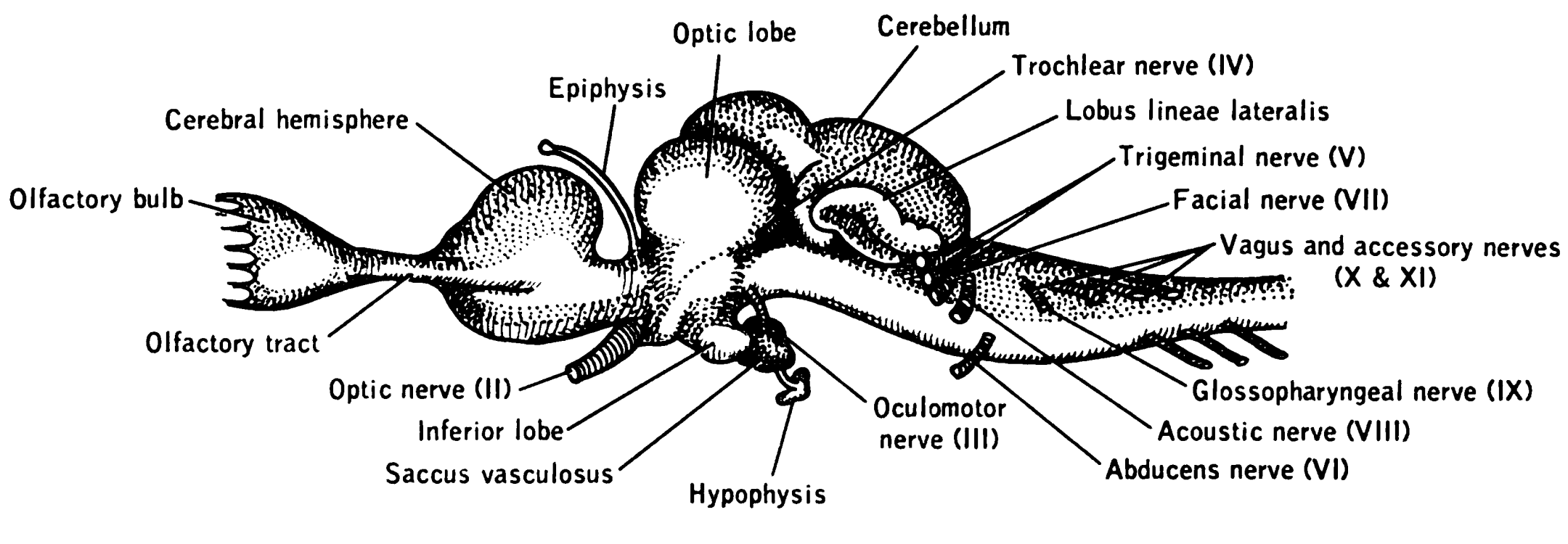
Dog-fish brain in two projections.
top; ventral bottom; lateral
The accessory nerve (XI) and hypoglossal nerve (XII) cannot be seen, as they are not always present in all vertebrates.

Cranial nerves are also present in other vertebrates. Other amniotes (non-amphibian tetrapods) have cranial nerves similar to those of humans. In anamniotes (fishes and amphibians), the accessory nerve (XI) and hypoglossal nerve (XII) do not exist, with the accessory nerve (XI) being an integral part of the vagus nerve (X); the hypoglossal nerve (XII) is represented by a variable number of spinal nerves emerging from vertebral segments fused into the occiput. These two nerves only became discrete nerves in the ancestors of amniotes. The very small terminal nerve (nerve N or O) exists in humans but may not be functional. In other animals, it appears to be important to sexual receptivity based on perceptions of pheromones.

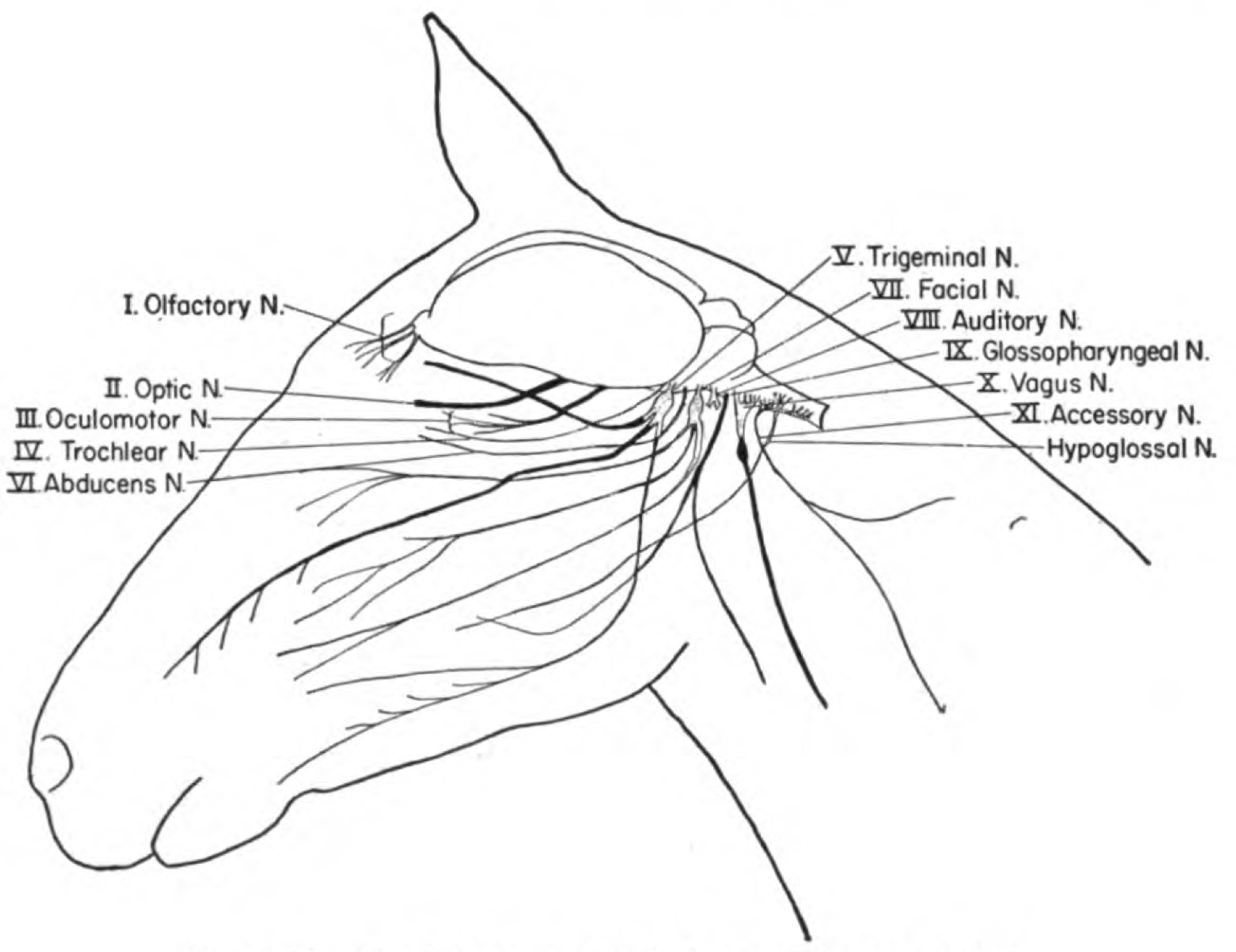
The cranial nerves in the horse

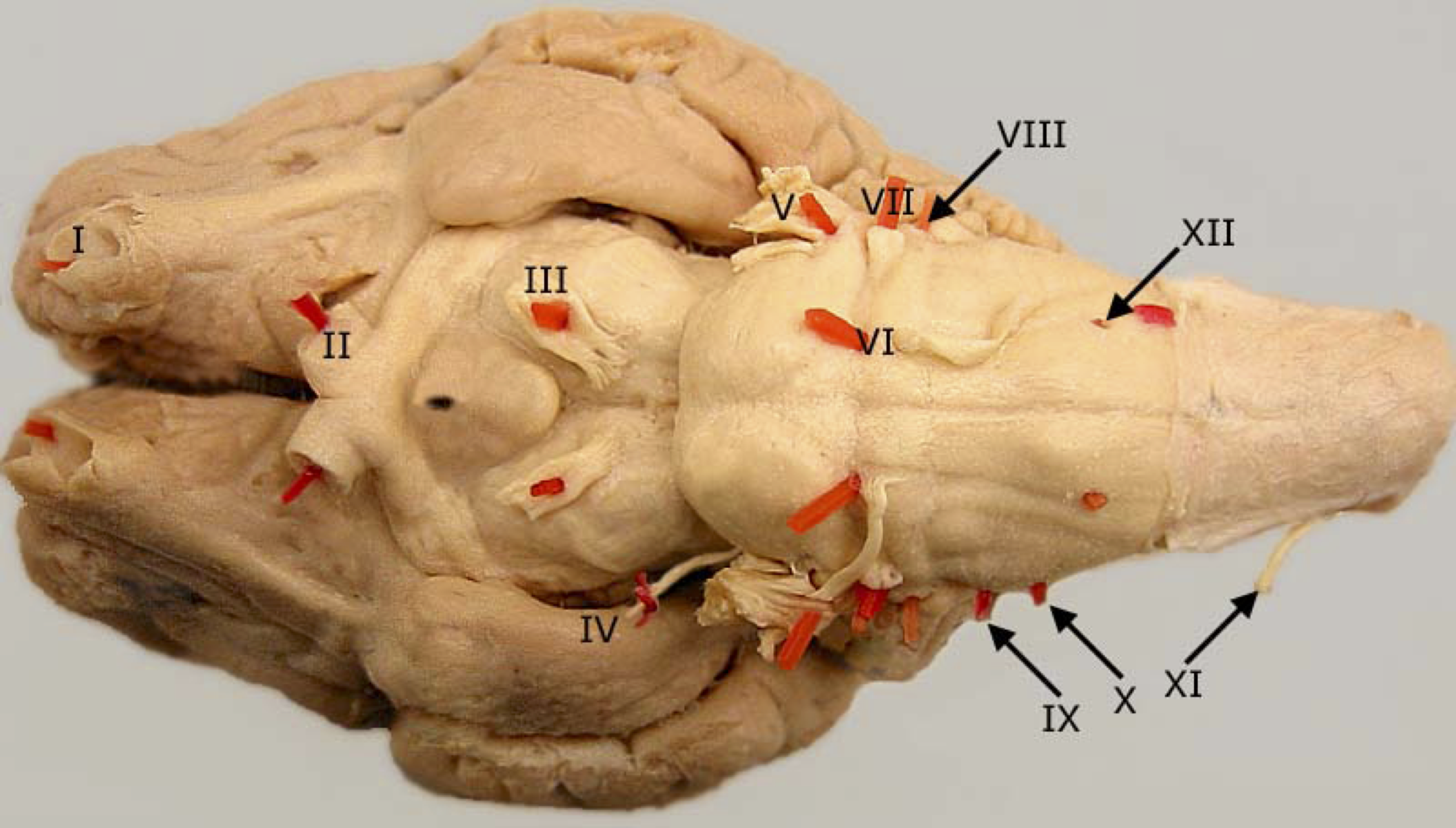
Ventral view of a sheep's brain. The exits of the various cranial nerves are marked with red.

== See also ==
- Cranial nerve mnemonics
- Spinal nerve
- Plexus
- Nerve plexus

- Brachial plexus
