= Orbital plate =

Orbital plate may refer to:

- Orbital part of frontal bone
- Orbital lamina of ethmoid bone
