= Mesethmoid =

Sagittal section of the skull of the cat, with mesethmoid labeled me.

The mesethmoid is an unpaired bone in the skull of many vertebrates. It forms a part of the ethmoid complex, of which it forms the anterior midline part; it helps to contain the nasal cavity. It is a part of the chondrocranium, and is frequently unossified. It is the anteriormost portion of the basicranium. When ossified it frequently forms the bony part of the nasal septum; in humans and other mammals it fuses to the ectethmoids and the cribriform plate to form the ethmoid bone, of which it is the perpendicular plate.

== Anatomy ==
As the mesethmoid is part of the chondrocranium, it ossifies from cartilage. It typically forms a thin sheet of bone along the midline of the skull, anterior to the braincase; it separates the left and right portions of the nasal cavity. Its anterior edge is generally rough, providing an attachment point for the nasal septal cartilage (with which it is homologous). Posteriorly it articulates with the groove of the vomer; dorsally it typically articulates with the frontal and occasionally the nasal.

== Evolution ==
The ossification of the ethmoid region is highly variable among tetrapods and has occurred convergently in a number of groups. Consequently, the identity of the bone or bones that makes up the ossified nasal septum varies among taxa, as does its articulations.

In some atherinomorph fishes, separate dorsal and ventral ossifications of the mesethmoid are present.

In some recumbirostrans it articulates posteriorly with the presphenoid; in other members of the clade the mesethmoid is absent, with the bony septum being composed of the presphenoid and/or orbitosphenoid.

The mesethmoid is unossified and absent in most archosaurs, including modern crocodilians. An ossified mesethmoid is present in many theropod dinosaurs, including birds.

In mammals, the mesethmoid is frequently ossified; when present it fuses posteriorly to the cribriform plate and laterally to the ectethmoids. The mesethmoid has been argued to be absent in a number of mammal groups, including monotremes, marsupials, xenarthrans, afrosoricida, elephants, sea cows, pangolins, and artiodactyls (including whales). The homology of bones in the nasal septum is, however, complex, and authors disagree about whether it was ancestrally present in placentals and in which modern mammals it is present.

The variable ossification of the mesethmoid led paleontologist Robert Broom in 1935 to propose a classification of mammals into Palaeotherida (those lacking mesethmoids) and Neotherida (those having mesethmoids). This classification is not supported by modern molecular phylogenetic analyses. In cetaceans and other ungulates, the ossified nasal septum was historically identified as the mesethmoid; however, more recent evidence suggests this element is in fact the presphenoid.
