= Ectethmoid =

The ectethmoid (literally "outer ethmoid"), also known as the lateral mass of the ethmoid, lateral ethmoid, or parethmoid, is a paired bone of the skull in many vertebrates. It forms a part of the ethmoid complex, helping to support the internal part of the nasal cavity. When present, it is often fused to the lacrimal (in birds) or to the mesethmoid and cribriform plate to form the ethmoid (in humans and other mammals).

== Anatomy ==
The ectethmoid is located laterally to the mesethmoid and anterior to the cribriform plate, and is sometimes referred to as the "lateral mass". It articulates with the frontal and the nasal dorsally, and ventrally with the posterior part of the vomer. It encloses the dorsal portion of the nasal cavity.

Like all parts of the ethmoid, it develops from cartilaginous precursors, and is considered a part of the chondrocranium. In mammals, it is largely composed of thin, scroll-like extensions of bone known as the ethmoturbinals, which serve to increase the surface area of the olfactory mucosa and improve the sense of smell.

A 2011 study analyzing development in mouse and chicken embryos found that the proteins DLX5 and DLX6 are essential for the development of the ectethmoid. In embryos lacking both proteins, the mesethmoid and cribriform plate develop, but the ectethmoids fail to do so.

== Evolution ==
The ectethmoid forms a part of the chondrocranium, and in modern sharks the ectethmoid process is a cartilaginous portion of the skull to which tendons controlling the jaws and lips attach.

Ossified ectethmoids are present in coelacanths.

The ectethmoid is believed to have undergone ossification convergently in multiple tetrapod lineages. In mammals, it fuses to the mesethmoid and cribriform plate to form the ethmoid; it may be present as an unfused element among some cetaceans. In birds, the ectethmoid is variably ossified or unossified, and may be fused to the lacrimal bone or present as an unfused element in different taxa. The element is also ossified in ankylosaurid and pachycephalosaurid dinosaurs.
