= Terminal nerve =

Cranial nerve 0

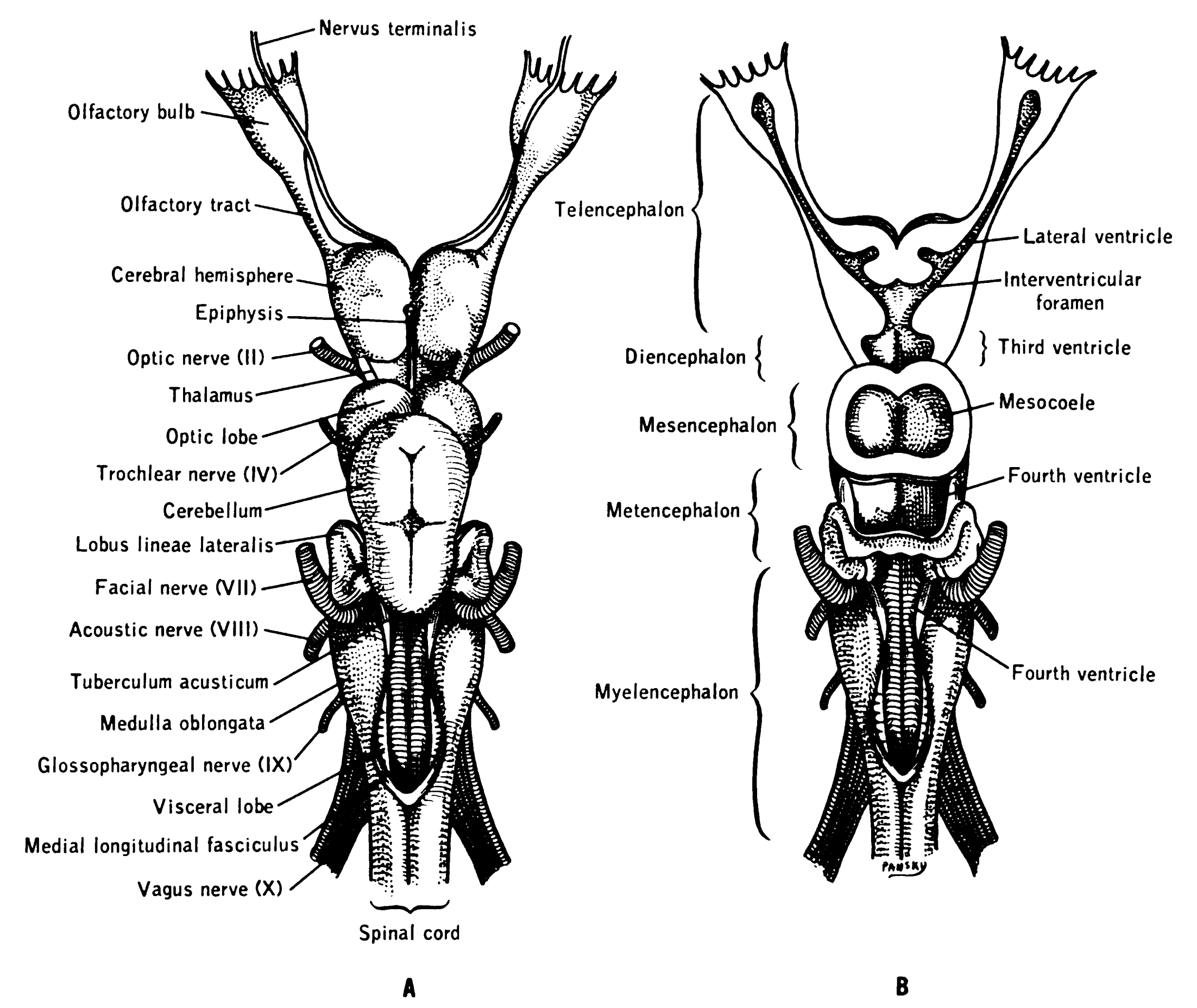
- Left The terminal nerve as it is shown on the ventral side of a dog-fish brain. (Topmost label)

Details

Identifiers
- Latin: nervus terminalis
- TA98: A14.2.01.002
- TA2: 6179
- FMA: 76749

The terminal nerve, also known as cranial nerve zero or simply as CN 0, is a nerve that was not included in the seminal classification of the cranial nerves as CN I through CN XII, but has since been recognized and listed in TA2. It was discovered by German scientist Gustav Fritsch in 1878 in the brains of sharks, and was first found in humans in 1913. Studies have confirmed that the terminal nerve is a common finding in the adult human brain.

The accepted name of terminal nerve is due to its entrance in the lamina terminalis regions. The nerve has previously been called nerve of Pinkus, tractus olfacto-commissuralis, nervus terminalis, cranial nerve XIII, zero nerve, nerve N, and NT.

== Structure ==
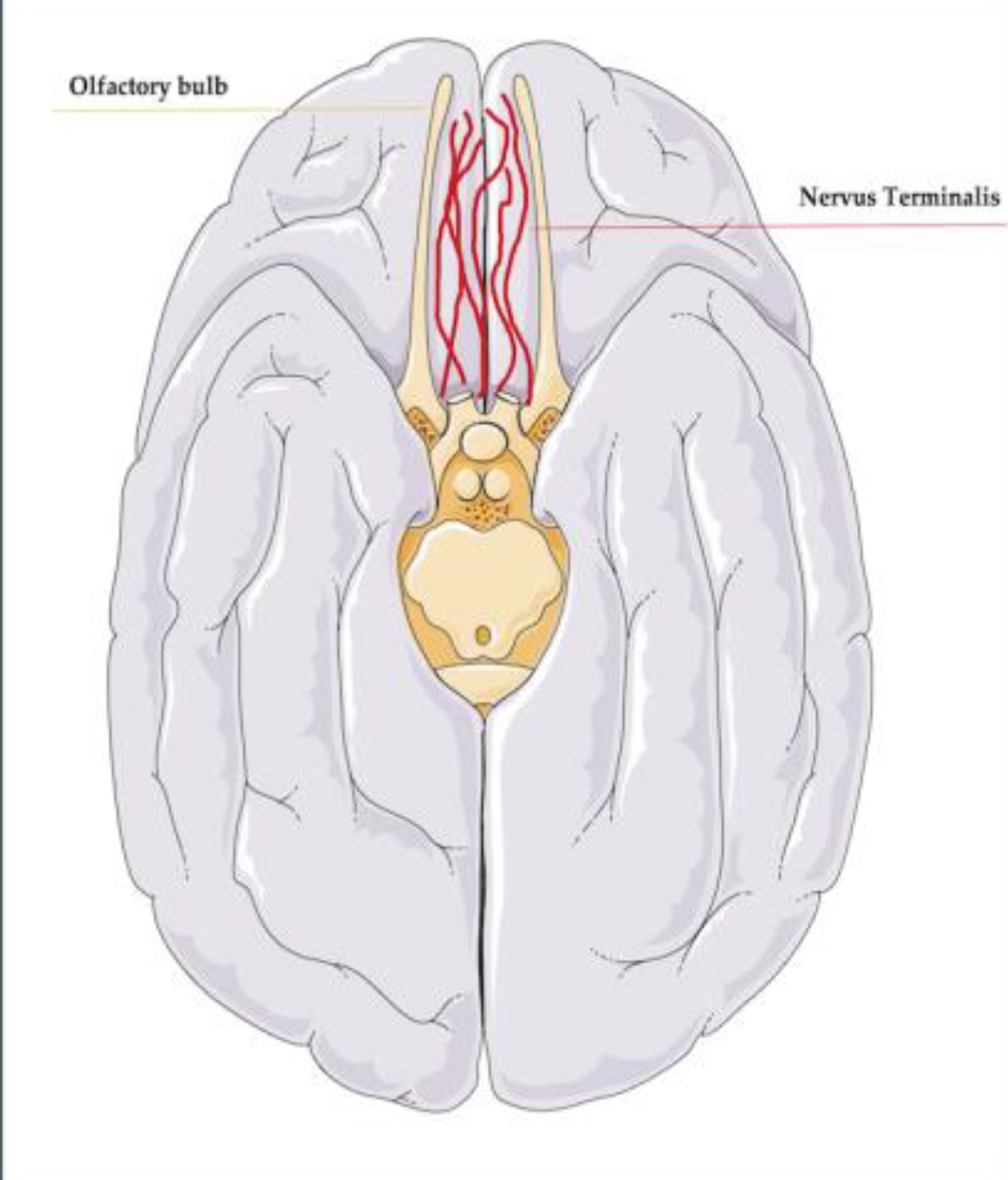
Image represents ventral aspect (inferior view) of the human brain with the terminal nerve reticulated in red

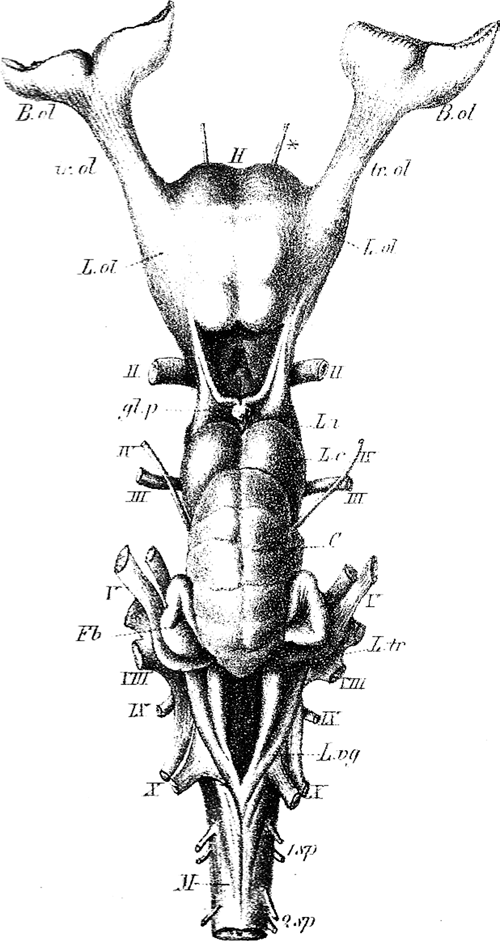
The original images (1878) of Fritsch's dogfish shark brain showing the nerve marked by an asterisk (top right-side in image)

The terminal nerve appears just in front of the other cranial nerves (rostral to all other cranial nerves, located on the ventral surface of the human brain) and would, if earlier recognized, have been classified as cranial nerve one. It first appears bilaterally as a microscopic plexus of unmyelinated peripheral nerve fibers in the subarachnoid space covering the straight gyrus. The plexus appears near the cribriform plate and travels posteriorly toward the olfactory trigone and lamina terminalis.

The terminal nerve is clearly seen in the human embryo but loses some of its ganglion cells before birth making it less recognizable in adults. The nerve is therefore often overlooked in autopsies, and is often torn out upon exposing the brain. Careful dissection is necessary to visualize the nerve.

=== Development ===
The zebrafish was used as a developmental model in research from 2004.

The connections between the terminal nerve and the olfactory system have been extensively studied in human embryos. Olfactory nerve fibers enter the brain at stage 17, fibers from the vomeronasal organ and fibers of the terminal nerve enter the brain at stages 17 and 18. During prenatal development some of the ganglion cells are lost.

== Function ==
The functions of the terminal nerve are only speculated on together with possible pathological implications. Although very close to the olfactory nerve, the terminal nerve is not connected to the olfactory bulb, where smells are analyzed. This suggests that the nerve is either vestigial or may be related to the sensing of pheromones. The nerve may modulate olfactory inputs making pheromones (particularly sex pheromones) more detectable. This hypothesis is further supported by the fact that the terminal nerve projects to the medial and lateral septal nuclei and the preoptic areas, all of which are involved in reproduction in mammals. A 1987 study found that mating in hamsters is reduced when the terminal nerve is severed.

== Clinical significance ==
Alterations in the terminal nerve structure may be implicated in Kallmann syndrome.

== Additional images ==
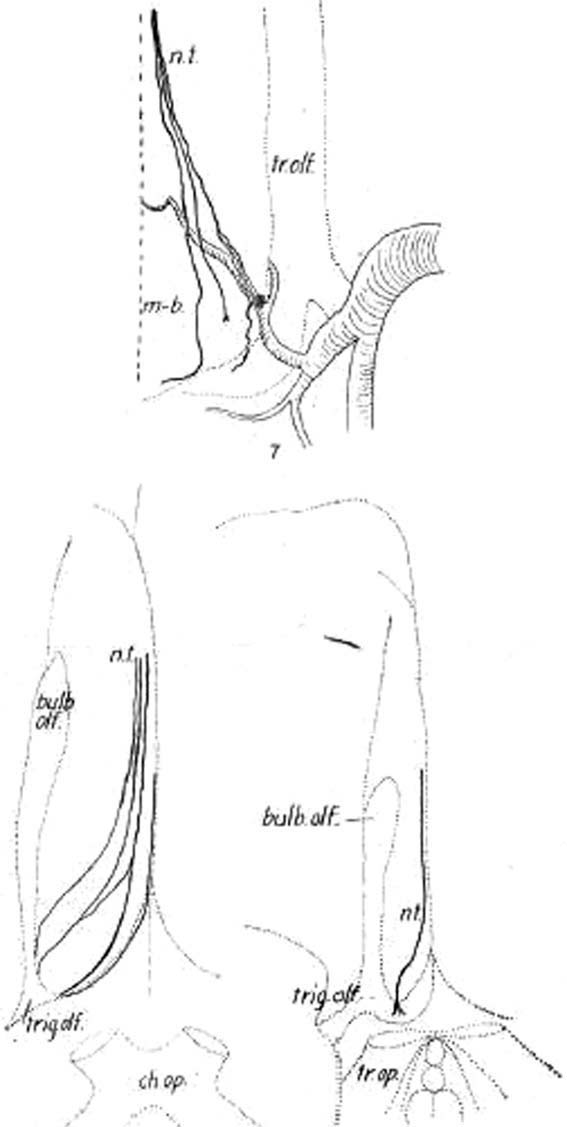
Three forms of the nerve on the underside of human brains

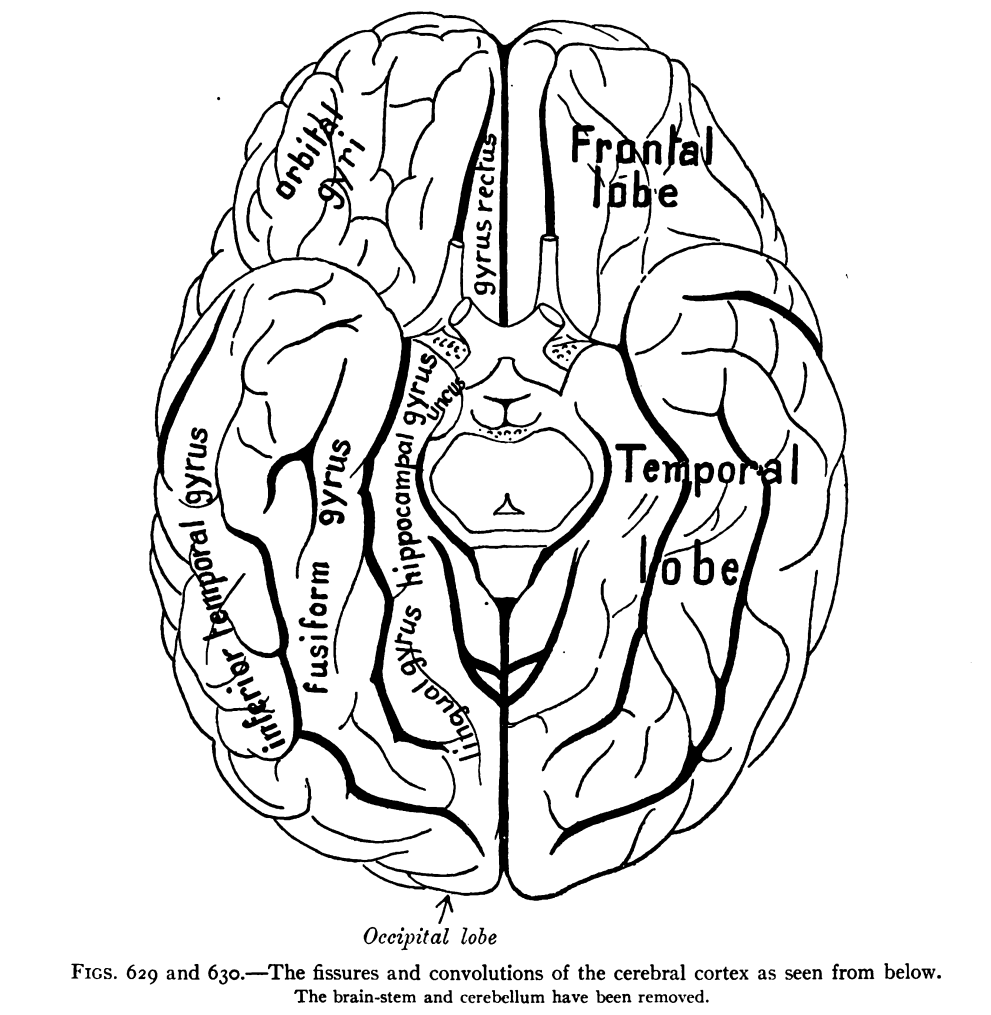
Brain viewed from below. Gyrus rectus seen at anterior centre.
