= Predrag Keros =

Croatian doctor and professor

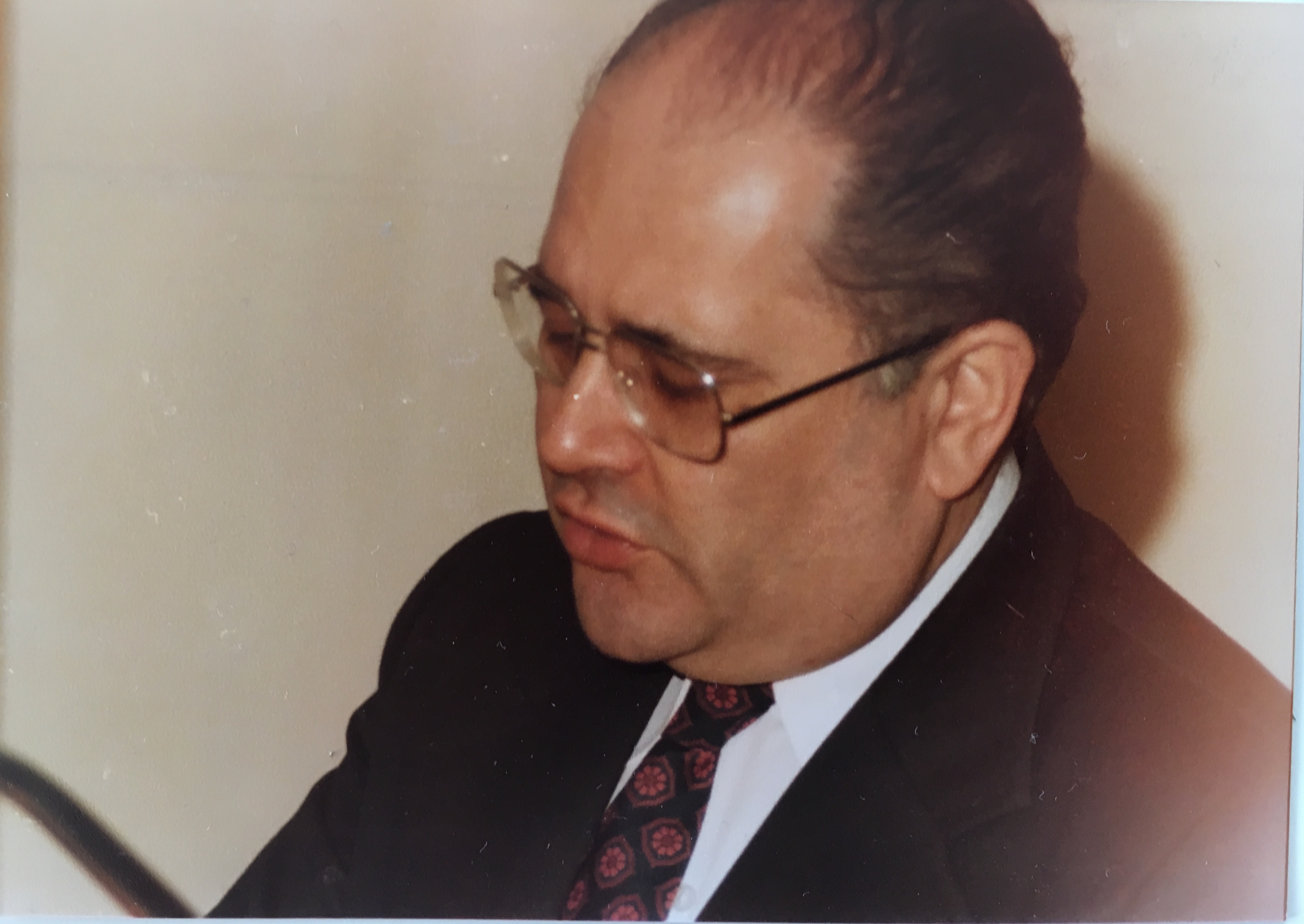
- Born: 17 September 1933; Zagreb, Croatia
- Died: 23 February 2018 (aged 84); Zagreb, Croatia
- Citizenship: Croatian
- Known for: Keros classification
- Scientific career
- Fields: Neuroscience

Predrag Keros (17 September 1933 – 23 February 2018) was a Croatian doctor and professor, known for developing the Keros classification technique.

== Biography ==
He was born in Zagreb. He earned his MD (1958) and PhD (1962) from the School of Medicine, University of Zagreb.

He became a professor and taught in medical and dental schools, and held leadership positions at the university and in professional organizations.

He was editor-in-chief of Libri oncologici and.Acta Facultatis Medicae Zagrabiensis

He contributed significantly to medical education and research, and was involved in various professional organizations.

Keros is known for his method of classifying the depth of the olfactory fossa, called Keros classification.

== Awards ==
- City of Zagreb General Assembly Award – the Memorial Medal (1970)
- Diploma of Medical News, from the Croatian Medical Association (1977)
- Boris Janković Argus Award (1981)
- University of Osijek Award (1985)
- State Award for Science (Zagreb)
- City of Zagreb Prize for Science (1989)
- Josip Juraj Strossmayer Award (2006)
- Honorary Member of the Croatian Medical Association (2011)
- State Prize for the Promotion of Science – Lifetime Achievement (2011).
