= Orbital lamina of ethmoid bone =

Bone plate

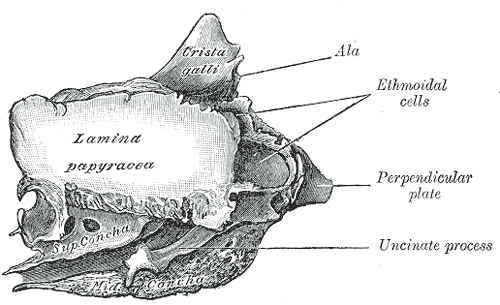
- Ethmoid bone from the right side. (Lamina papyracea visible at center left.)

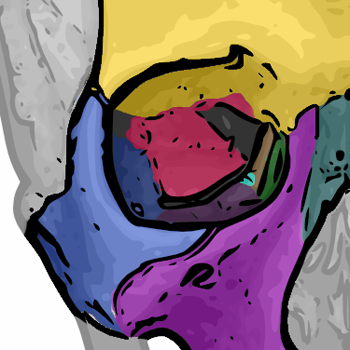
- The seven bones which articulate to form the orbit. (Ethmoid is brown.)

Details

Identifiers
- Latin: lamina orbitalis ossis ethmoidalis
- TA98: A02.1.07.011
- TA2: 732
- FMA: 57451

The orbital lamina of ethmoid bone (or lamina papyracea or orbital lamina) is a smooth, oblong, paper-thin bone plate which forms the lateral wall of the labyrinth of the ethmoid bone. It covers the middle and posterior ethmoidal cells, and forms a large part of the medial wall of the orbit.

It articulates above with the orbital plate of the frontal bone, below with the maxilla and the orbital process of palatine bone, in front with the lacrimal, and behind with the sphenoid.

Its name lamina papyracea is an appropriate description, as this part of the ethmoid bone is paper-thin and fractures easily. A fracture here could cause entrapment of the medial rectus muscle.

== Additional images ==
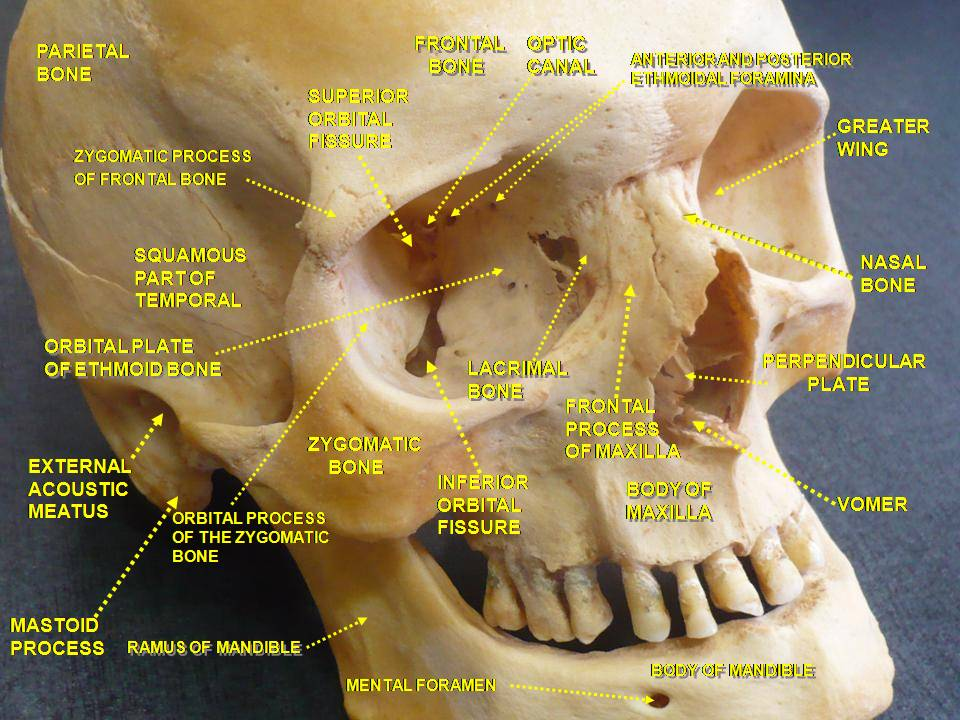
Orbital lamina of ethmoid bone
