= Crista galli =

Upper part of the ethmoid bone of the skull

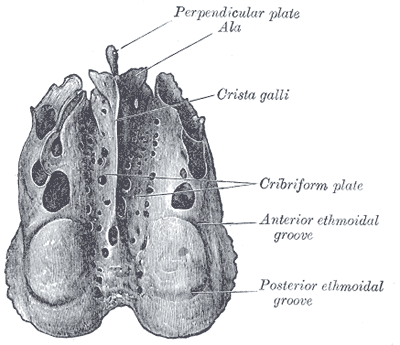
- Ethmoid bone from above.

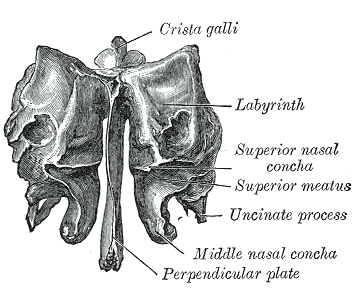
- Ethmoid bone from behind.

Details
- Part of: Perpendicular plate of the ethmoid bone
- System: Skeletal

Identifiers
- Latin: crista galli
- TA98: A02.1.07.004
- TA2: 724
- FMA: 57442

The crista galli (Latin: "crest of the rooster") is a wedge-shaped, vertical, midline upward continuation of the perpendicular plate of the ethmoid bone of the skull, projecting above the cribriform plate into the cranial cavity. It serves as an attachment for the membranes surrounding the brain.

== Structure ==
=== Attachments ===
The falx cerebri (a fold of the dura mater surrounding the brain) attaches to the crista galli.

=== Relations ===
The olfactory bulbs of the olfactory nerve lie on either side of the crista galli on top of the cribriform plate.

=== Variation ===
The base of crista galli varies in height. A bifid crista galli may suggest intracranial extension of a nasal dermoid cyst.
