= Perpendicular plate of ethmoid bone =

Part of a bone in the skull

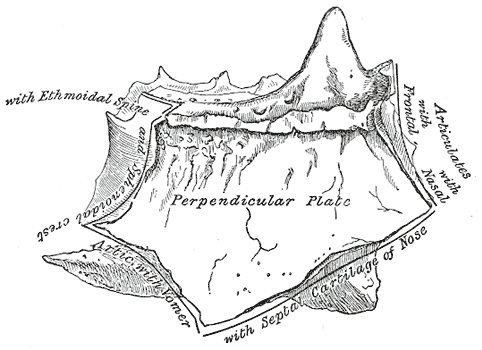
- Perpendicular plate of ethmoid. Shown by removing the right ethmoidal labyrinth.

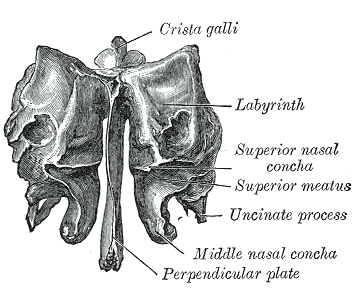
- Ethmoid bone from behind

Details

Identifiers
- Latin: lamina perpendicularis ossis ethmoidalis
- TA98: A02.1.07.006
- TA2: 726
- FMA: 52891

The perpendicular plate of the ethmoid bone (vertical plate) is a thin, flattened lamina, polygonal in form, which descends from the under surface of the cribriform plate, and assists in forming the septum of the nose; it is generally deflected a little to one or other side. The anterior border articulates with the spine of the frontal bone and the crest of the nasal bones.

The posterior border articulates by its upper half with the sphenoidal crest, by its lower with the vomer.

The inferior border is thicker than the posterior, and serves for the attachment of the septal nasal cartilage of the nose.

The surfaces of the plate are smooth, except above, where numerous grooves and canals are seen; these lead from the medial foramina on the cribriform plate and lodge filaments of the olfactory nerves.

In other animals, the perpendicular plate is variably present or absent. When present, it frequently forms a separate bone known as the mesethmoid.

== Additional images ==
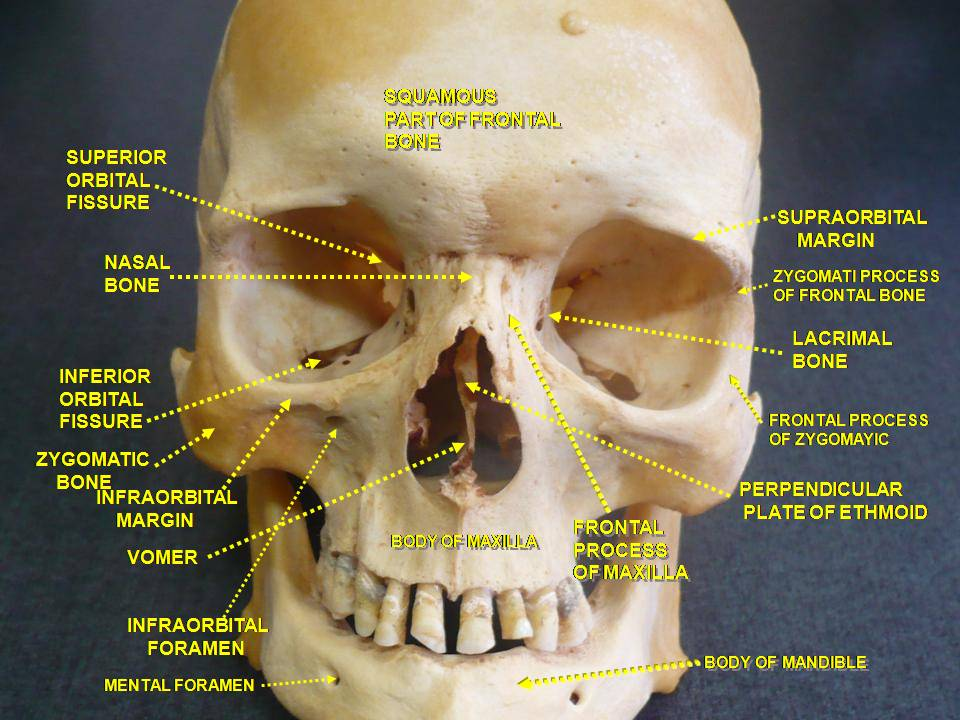
Perpendicular plate of ethmoid
