= Vomer =

Unpaired facial bone of the skull

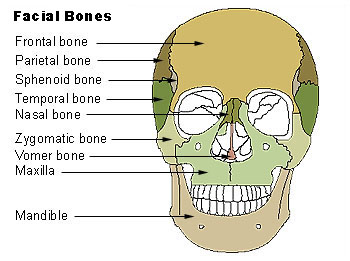
- Vomer labeled at left.

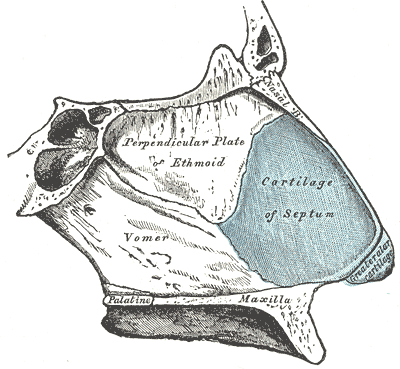
- Bones and cartilages of the nasal septum, right side, with the vomer labeled at center left.

Details

Identifiers
- Latin: vomer
- MeSH: D055172
- TA98: A02.1.11.001
- TA2: 751
- FMA: 9710

The vomer (/ˈvoʊmər/; Latin: vomer, lit. 'ploughshare') is one of the unpaired facial bones of the skull. It is located in the midsagittal line, and articulates with the sphenoid, the ethmoid, the left and right palatine bones, and the left and right maxillary bones. The vomer forms the inferior part of the nasal septum in humans, with the superior part formed by the perpendicular plate of the ethmoid bone. The name is derived from the Latin word for a ploughshare and the shape of the bone.

== In humans ==
The vomer is situated in the median plane, but its anterior portion is frequently bent to one side.

It is thin, somewhat quadrilateral in shape, and forms the hinder and lower part of the nasal septum; it has two surfaces and four borders.

The surfaces are marked by small furrows for blood vessels, and on each is the vomerine groove (also nasopalatine groove or Scarpa's sulcus), which runs obliquely downward and forward, and lodges the nasopalatine nerve (also Scarpa's nerve) and vessels.

=== Borders ===
The superior border, the thickest, presents a deep furrow, bounded on either side by a horizontal projecting expansion of bone – called the wing of vomer; the furrow receives the rostrum of the sphenoid, while the margins of the alae articulate with the vaginal processes of the medial pterygoid plates of the sphenoid behind, and with the sphenoidal processes of the palatine bones in front.

The inferior border articulates with the crest formed by the maxillæ and palatine bones.

The anterior border is the longest and slopes downward and forward. Its upper half is fused with the perpendicular plate of the ethmoid; its lower half is grooved for the inferior margin of the septal cartilage of the nose.

The posterior border is free of bony articulation, having no muscle attachments. It is concave, separates the choanae, and is thick and bifid above, thin below.

=== Articulations ===
The human vomer articulates with six bones:

- two of the cranium, the sphenoid and ethmoid.
- four of the face, two maxillae; and two palatine bones.

It also articulates with the septal cartilage of the nose.

== Vomeronasal organ ==
The vomeronasal organ, also called Jacobson's organ, is a chemoreceptor organ named for its closeness to the vomer and nasal bones, and is particularly developed in animals such as cats (who adopt a characteristic pose called the Flehmen reaction or flehming when making use of it), and is thought to have to do with the perception of certain pheromones.

== In other animals ==
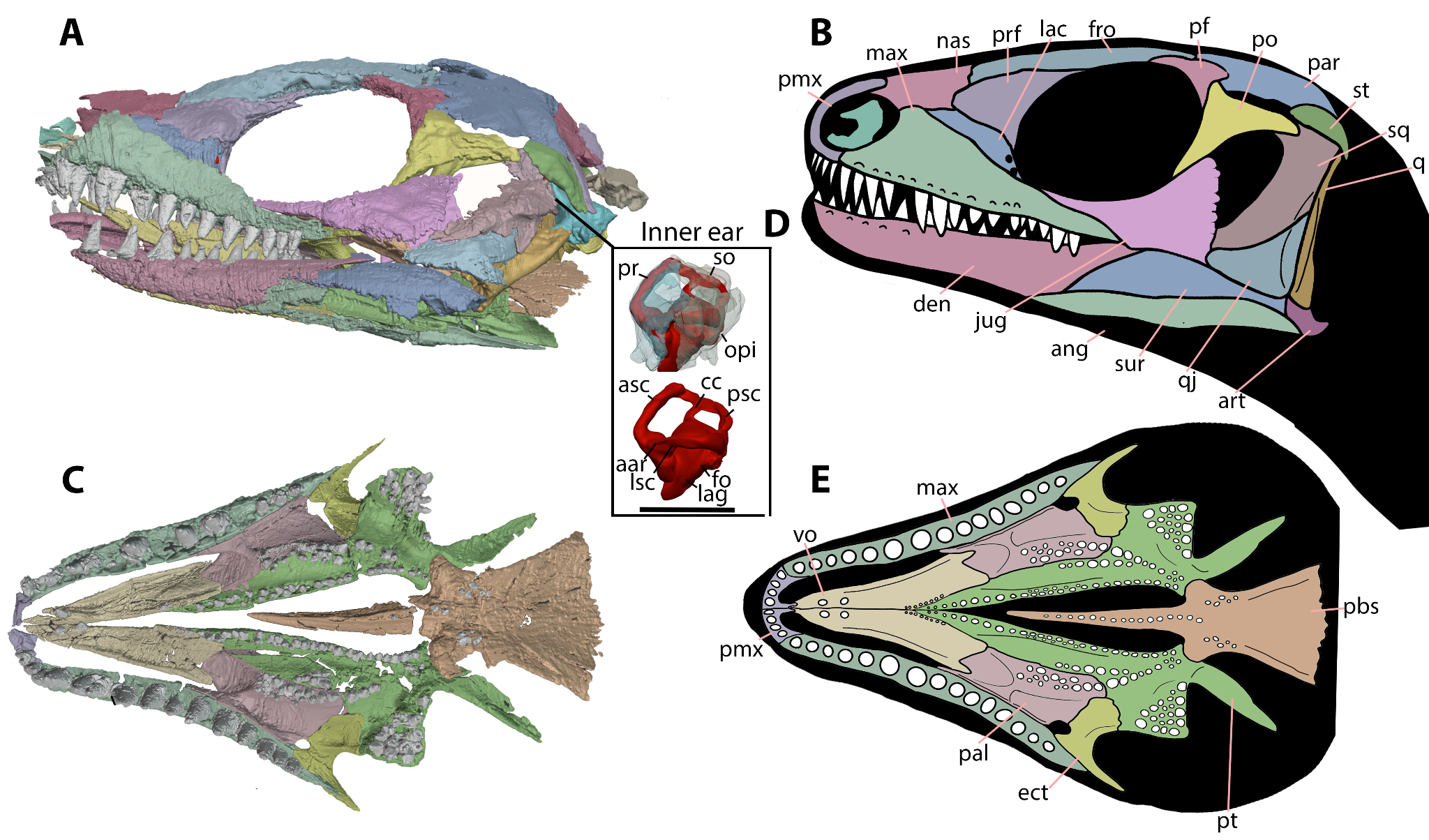
Skull of the early reptile Milleretta rubidgei (Millerettidae), showing vomer bones bearing palatal teeth on the underside of the skull (labeled vo, tan, bottom right)

In bony fish, the vomers are flattened, paired, bones forming the anterior part of the roof of the mouth, just behind the premaxillary bones. In many species, they have teeth, supplementing those in the jaw proper; in some labyrinthodonts (extinct amphibians) the teeth on the vomers were actually larger than the primary set. In amphibians and reptiles, the vomers become narrower, due to the presence of the enlarged choanae (the inner part of the nostrils) on either side, and they may extend further back in the jaw. They are typically small in birds, where they form the upper hind part of the beak, again being located between the choanae.

In some living salamanders, including the mudpuppy, the maxilla is absent and therefore the vomerine teeth fulfill a major functional role in the upper jaw.

In mammals, the vomers have become narrower still, and are fused into a single, vertically oriented bone. The development of the hard palate beneath the vomer means that the bone is now located in a nasal chamber, separate from the mouth.

=== "Prevomer" ===
Historically, there was significant confusion in the homology of the vomer across vertebrate groups. Palaeontologist Robert Broom suggested that the unpaired vomer of mammals was actually equivalent to the unpaired parasphenoid of other vertebrates; further, he proposed that the paired vomers of lizards (and, by extension, other non-mammalian vertebrates) were a separate element, which he called the prevomer; he further argued that the prevomer was homologous to the os paradoxum of the platypus and the palatine process of the premaxilla in other mammals. His work was highly influential.

However, later work determined that, contrary to Broom, the parasphenoid is present in mammals; therefore, the mammalian vomer is not a parasphenoid, but likely resulted from fusion of the paired vomers. The os paradoxum and palatine processes of the premaxilla are separately derived. Nevertheless, the influence of Broom's work led to the term "prevomer" becoming applied to the vomer of fishes, and the term remains in use.

== Additional images ==
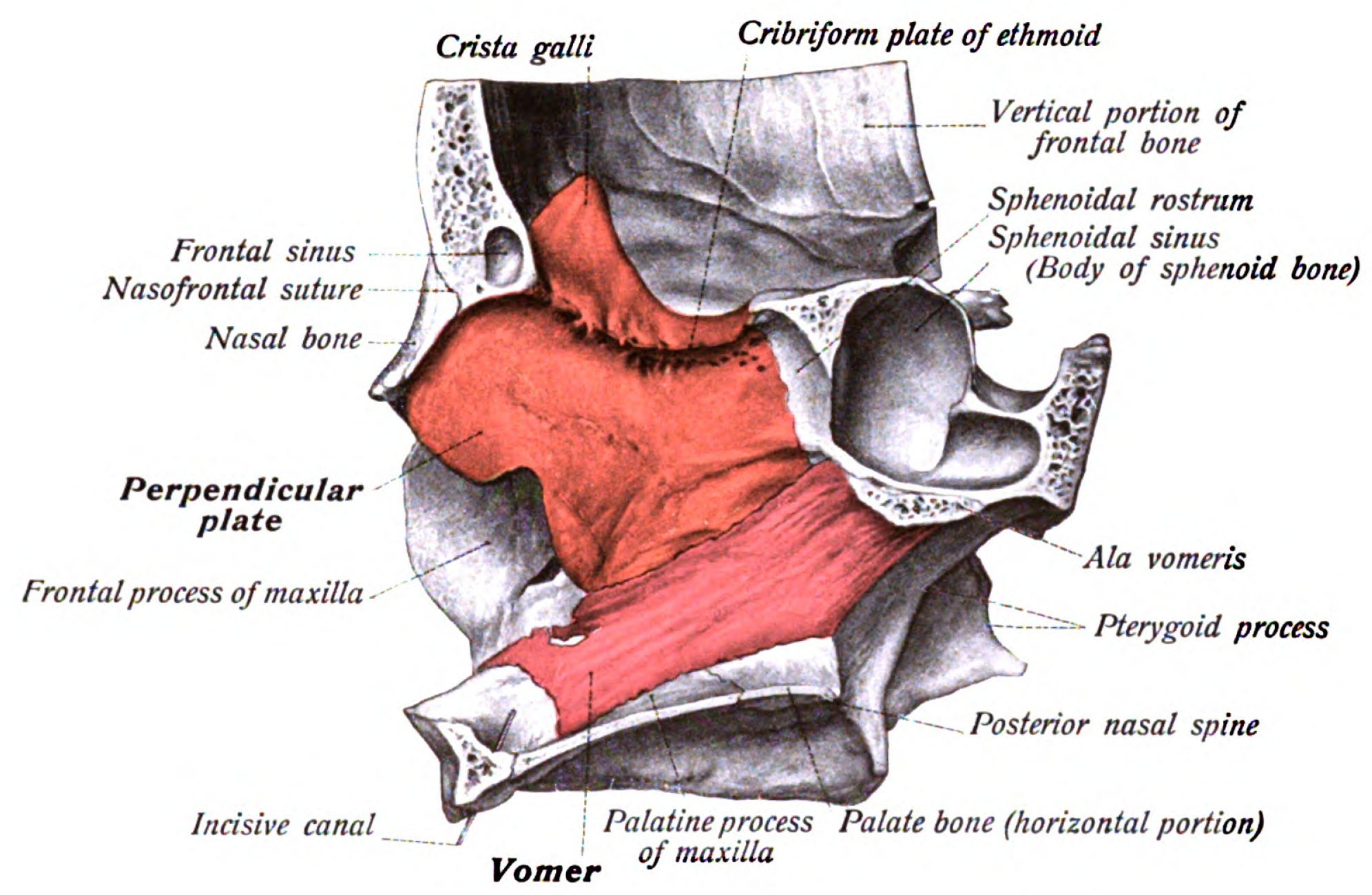

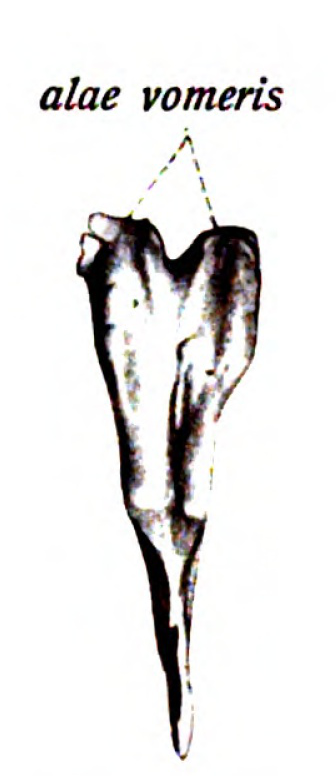

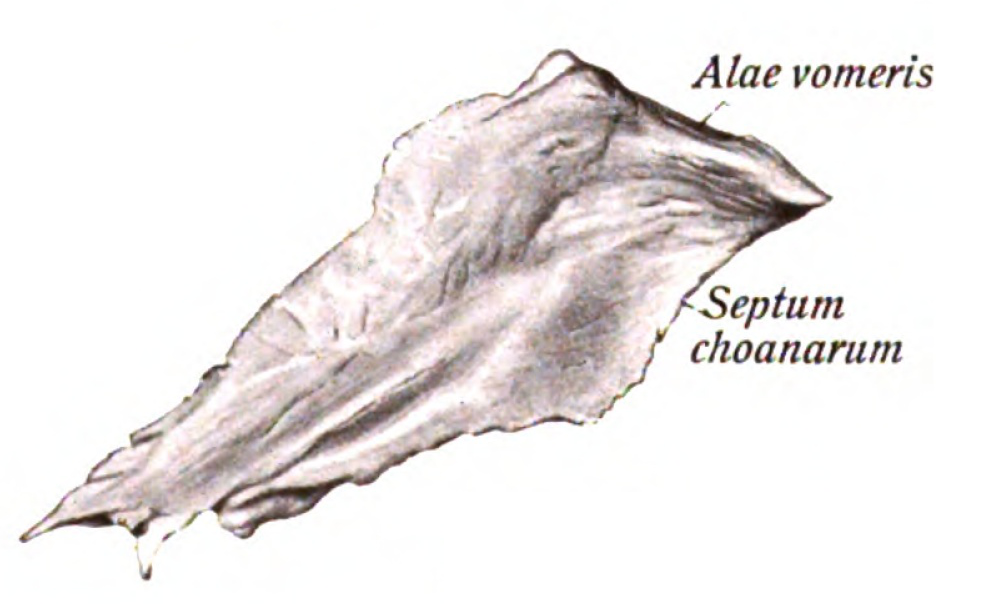

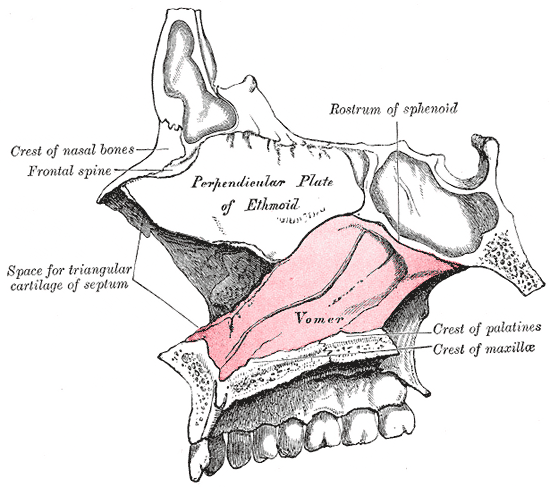
Median wall of left nasal cavity showing vomer in situ.

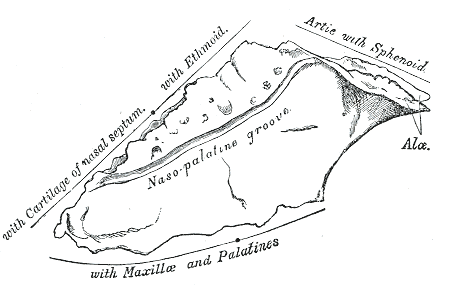
The vomer.

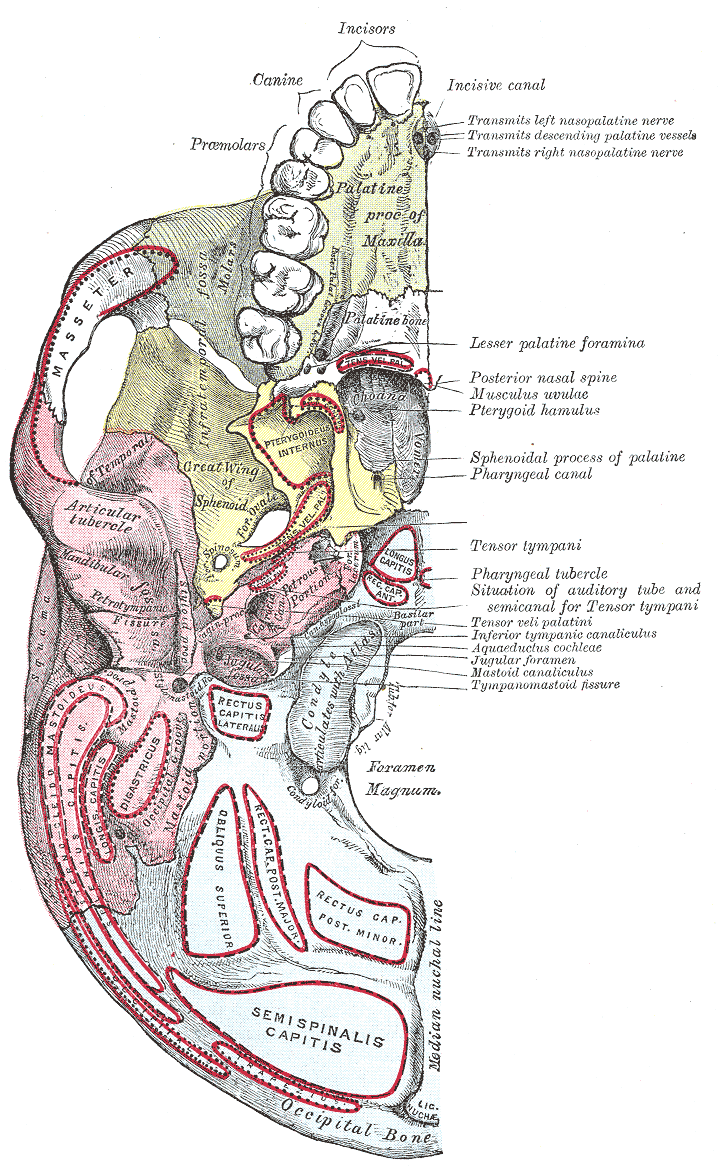
Base of skull. Inferior surface.

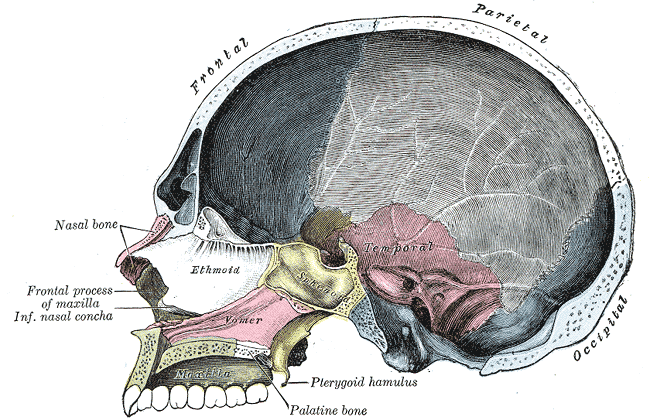
Sagittal section of skull.

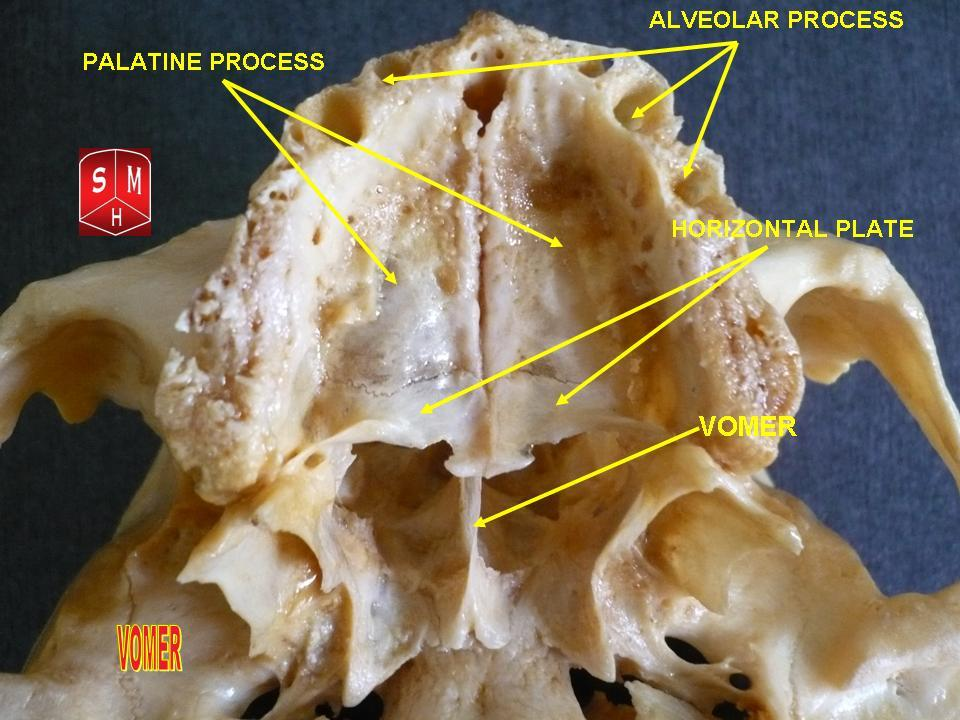
Vomer

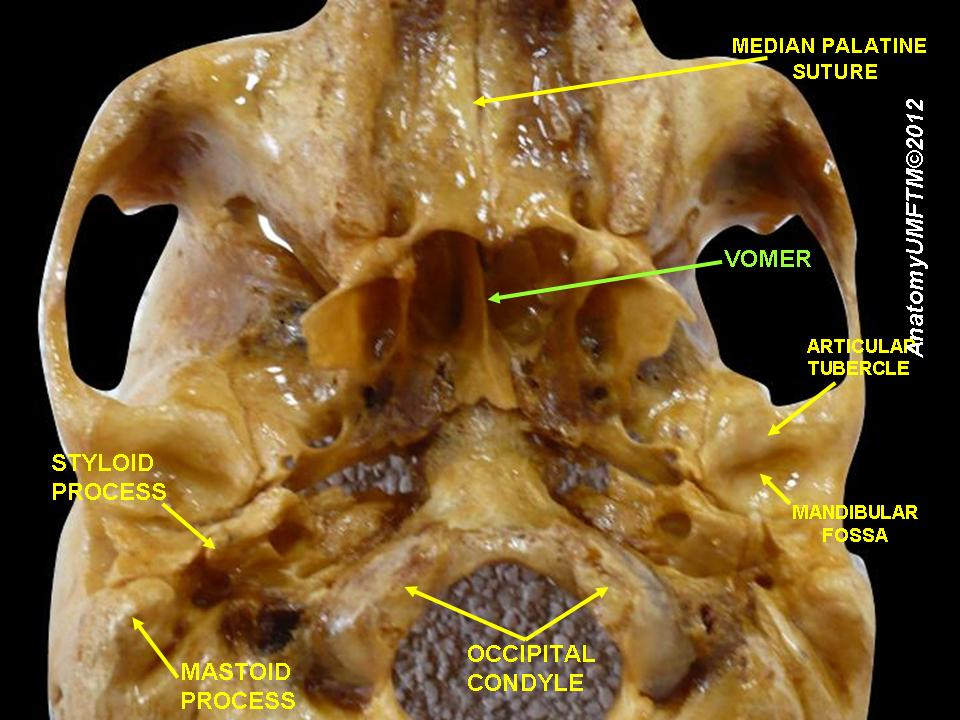
Vomer

== See also ==
- Choana – Openings from the nasal cavity to the throat
