= Cribriform plate =

Part of the ethmoid bone in the skull

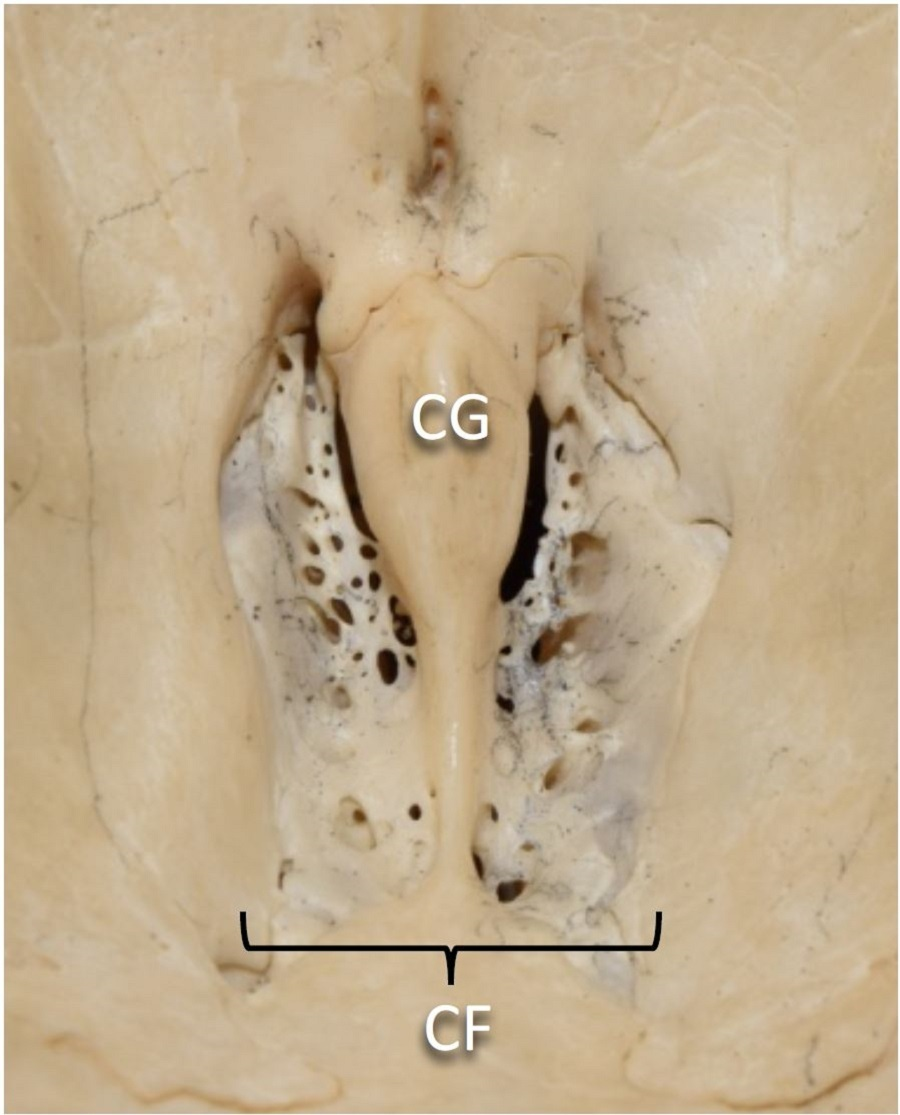
- Superior view of the central part of the anterior cranial fossa. CG: crista galli; CF: cribriform plate

- 1: Olfactory bulb 2: Mitral cells 3: Cribriform plate 4: Olfactory epithelium 5: Glomerulus; 6: Olfactory receptor neurons

Details
- Part of: Ethmoid bone of the human skull
- System: Skeletal

Identifiers
- Latin: lamina cribrosa ossis ethmoidalis
- TA98: A02.1.07.002
- TA2: 722
- FMA: 52890

In mammalian anatomy, the cribriform plate (Latin for lit. sieve-shaped), horizontal lamina or lamina cribrosa is part of the ethmoid bone. It is received into the ethmoidal notch of the frontal bone and roofs in the nasal cavities. It supports the olfactory bulb, and is perforated by olfactory foramina for the passage of the olfactory nerves to the roof of the nasal cavity to convey smell to the brain. The foramina at the medial part of the groove allow the passage of the nerves to the upper part of the nasal septum while the foramina at the lateral part transmit the nerves to the superior nasal concha.

A fractured cribriform plate can result in olfactory dysfunction, septal hematoma, cerebrospinal fluid rhinorrhoea (CSF rhinorrhoea), and possibly infection which can lead to meningitis. CSF rhinorrhoea (clear fluid leaking from the nose) is very serious and considered a medical emergency. Aging can cause the openings in the cribriform plate to close, pinching olfactory nerve fibers. A reduction in olfactory receptors, loss of blood flow, and thick nasal mucus can also cause an impaired sense of smell.

== Structure ==
The cribriform plate is part of the ethmoid bone, which has a low density, and is spongy. It is narrow, with deep grooves supporting the olfactory bulb.

Its anterior border, short and thick, articulates with the frontal bone. It has two small projecting alae (wings), which are received into corresponding depressions in the frontal bone to complete the foramen cecum.

Its sides are smooth, and sometimes bulging due to the presence of a small air sinus in the interior.

The crista galli projects upwards from the middle line of the cribriform plate. The long thin posterior border of the crista galli serves for the attachment of the falx cerebri. On either side of the crista galli, the cribriform plate is narrow and deeply grooved. At the front part of the cribriform plate, on either side of the crista galli, is a small fissure that is occupied by a process of dura mater.

Lateral to this fissure is a notch or foramen which transmits the nasociliary nerve; from this notch a groove extends backward to the anterior ethmoidal foramen.

=== Development ===
The cribriform plate is formed from the fetal age to the end of the first year, completing ossification. Deriving from the nasal capsule, formation begins specifically during the 5th week of gestation. Ossification begins at its most anterior part and proceeds in a posterior manner. The position also shifts from vertical during the 1st postnatal month to horizontal at the age of 6 months.

The cribriform plate is one of four ossifications that fuse to make up the ethmoid, the others being the mesethmoid and paired ectethmoids.

=== Keros classification ===
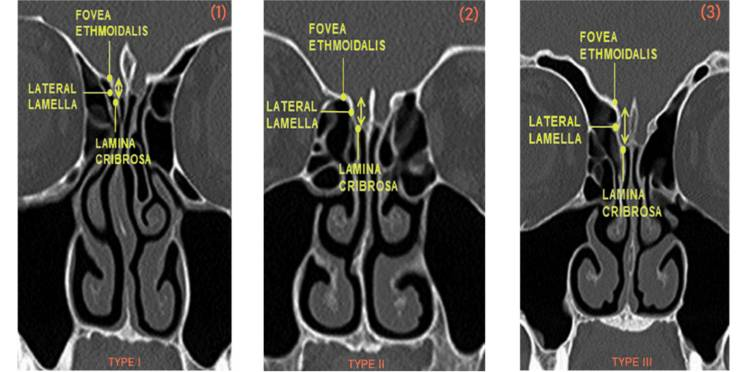
From left to right, Keros type I, II, and III.

The Keros classification is a method of classifying the depth of the olfactory fossa.

The depth of the olfactory fossa is determined by the height of the lateral lamella of the cribriform plate. Keros in 1962, classified the depth into three categories.

- type 1: has a depth of 1–3 mm (26.3% of population)
- type 2: has a depth of 4–7 mm (73.3% of population)
- type 3: has a depth of 8–16 mm (0.5% of population)
- type 4: has asymmetric depths (described by Stammberger)

== Function ==
The cribriform plate is perforated by olfactory foramina, which allow for the passage of the olfactory nerves to the roof of the nasal cavity. This conveys information from smell receptors to the brain. The foramina at the medial part of the groove allow the passage of the nerves to the upper part of the nasal septum while the foramina at the lateral part transmit the nerves to the superior nasal concha.

== Clinical significance ==
A fractured cribriform plate (anterior skull trauma) can result in leaking of cerebrospinal fluid into the nose and loss of sense of smell. The tiny apertures of the plate transmitting the olfactory nerve become the route of ascent for a pathogen, Naegleria fowleri. This amoeba tends to destroy the olfactory bulb and the adjacent inferior surface of the frontal lobe of the brain. This surface initially becomes the site of proliferation of the trophozoites of Naegleria fowleri and their subsequent spread to the rest of the brain and CSF. Because of its initial involvement and trophozoite presence in early phases of Naegleria fowleri infection, flushing of this region with saline using a device, to obtain Naegleria fowleri for diagnostic PCR and microscopic viewing, has been proposed for patients affected by naegleriasis, by (Baig AM., et al.) in a recent publication. Researchers have suggested the same route to administer drugs at an early phase of infection by using a "Transcribrial Device" that has been proposed to kill this pathogen at the place of its maximum proliferation. In 2017 the inventor of this device suggested that after slight modifications this method could be effective in delivery of stem cells to the brain as well. A recent Australian study has shown that the bacterium causing the tropical disease melioidosis, Burkholderia pseudomallei, can also invade the brain via the olfactory nerve within 24 h by traversing the cribriform plate.

== Etymology ==
The cribriform plate is named after its resemblance to a sieve (from Latin cribrum, "sieve" + -form). It is also known as the horizontal lamina, and the lamina cribrosa.

== Other animals ==
The cribriform plate is ancestrally unossified in tetrapods. Instead, the posterior wall of the nasal capsule (the so-called "cribriform region") is formed by a number of cartilages, and the olfactory nerves pass through a foramen in the posterior of the nasal capsule. It is rarely ossified outside of mammals; even in the closest cynodont relatives of mammals, the plate is unossified and cartilaginous. A few exceptions exist, notably, the ankylosaurid dinosaurs, the ostrich, and the kiwi.

The cribriform plate is found in every mammal that has been studied, though it is reduced in cetaceans; in ododontocetes, it is present only in early embryonic stages. It serves the same function of allowing passage of the olfactory nerves.

== Additional images ==
Animation. Cribriform plate (green) and olfactory nerves (yellow)

Human skull, superior view. The calvaria is removed.

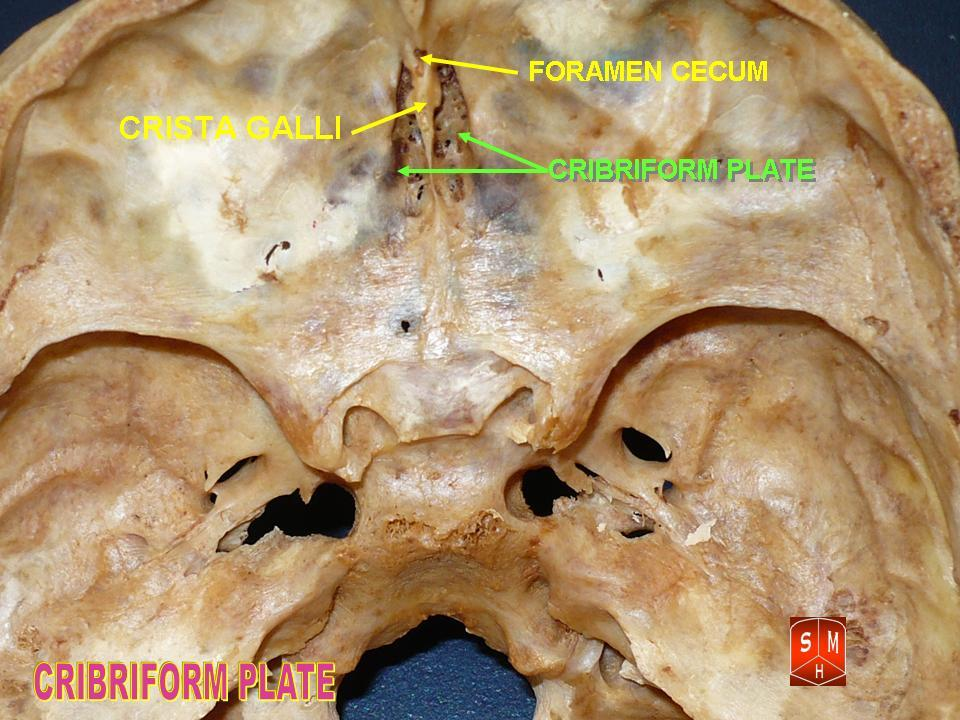
Cribriform plate

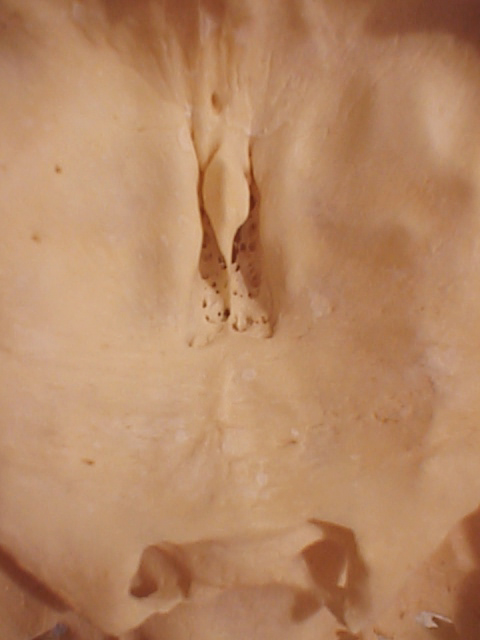
Cribriform plate

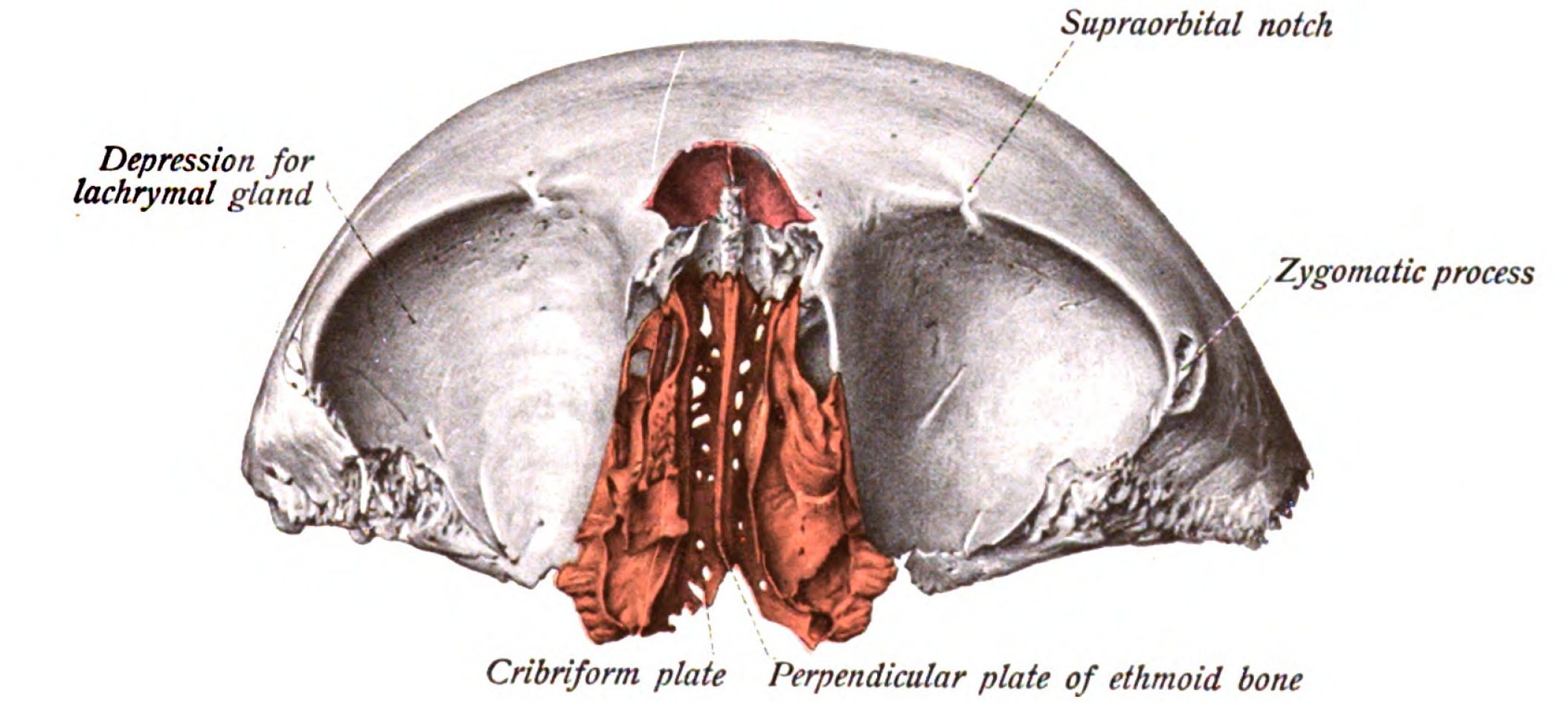
Ethmoid bone (red) and frontal bone, seen from bottom. Olfactory foramina are illustrated.

Video (1 min 32 s). Demonstrating crista galli, cribriform plate, and olfactory foramina.
