= Ethmoid bone =

Bone of the facial skeleton

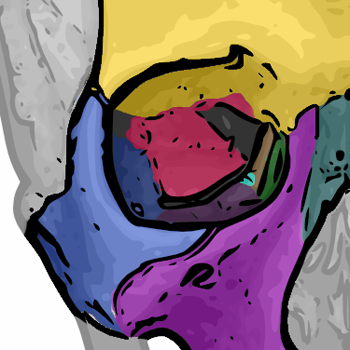
- Ethmoid inside the orbit (brown)

- Animation of the ethmoid bone

Details

Identifiers
- Latin: os ethmoidale
- MeSH: D005004
- TA98: A02.1.07.001
- TA2: 721
- FMA: 52740

The ethmoid bone (/ˈɛθmɔɪd/; from Ancient Greek: ἡθμός, romanized: hēthmós, lit. 'sieve') is an unpaired bone in the skull that separates the nasal cavity from the brain. It is located at the roof of the nose, between the two orbits. The cubical (cube-shaped) bone is lightweight due to a spongy construction. The ethmoid bone is one of the bones that make up the orbit of the eye.

== Structure ==
The ethmoid bone is an anterior cranial bone located between the eyes. It contributes to the medial wall of the orbit, the nasal cavity, and the nasal septum. The ethmoid has three parts: cribriform plate, ethmoidal labyrinth, and perpendicular plate. The cribriform plate forms the roof of the nasal cavity and also contributes to formation of the anterior cranial fossa, the ethmoidal labyrinth consists of a large mass on either side of the perpendicular plate, and the perpendicular plate forms the superior two-thirds of the nasal septum. Between the orbital plate and the nasal conchae are the ethmoidal sinuses or ethmoidal air cells, which are a variable number of small cavities in the lateral mass of the ethmoid.

=== Articulations ===
The ethmoid articulates with thirteen bones:

- two bones of the neurocranium—the frontal, and the sphenoid (at the sphenoidal body and at the sphenoidal conchae).
- eleven bones of the viscerocranium—two nasal bones, two maxillae, two lacrimals, two palatines, two inferior nasal conchae, and the vomer.

=== Development ===
The ethmoid is ossified in the cartilage of the nasal capsule by three centers: one for the perpendicular plate, and one for each labyrinth.

The labyrinths are first developed, ossific granu. At birth, the bone consists of the two labyrinths, which are small and ill-developed. During the first year after birth, the perpendicular plate and crista galli begin to ossify from a single center, and are joined to the labyrinths about the beginning of the second year.

The cribriform plate is ossified partly from the perpendicular plate and partly from the labyrinths.

The development of the ethmoidal cells begins during fetal life.

The ethmoid forms from the fusion of four distinct ossification centers—the cribriform plate, the mesethmoid, and paired ectethmoids.

== Borders ==
The ethmoid bone anatomically separates the respiratory and inter cranial compartments, bordered superiorly by the frontal bone and inferiorly by the perpendicular plate meeting the vomer and septal cartilage. It articulates anteriorly with the nasal bones and maxilla, posteriorly with the sphenoid bone, and laterally via the lamina papyracea to form the medial walls of the orbits.

== Function ==
=== Role in magnetoception ===
Some birds and other migratory animals have deposits of biological magnetite in their ethmoid bones which allow them to sense the direction of the Earth's magnetic field. Humans have a similar magnetite deposit (ferric iron), but it is believed to be vestigial.

== Other animals ==
The ethmoid bone plays a distinct physiological and sensory role across various animal species, particularly regarding migratory behavior, where specialized micro-deposits of crystalline biological magnetite are housed within the ethmoid to function as specialized geomagnetic receptors, enabling organisms to detect the orientation and intensity of Earth's magnetic field for long-distance navigation. Furthermore, in quadrupedal mammals, the ethmoid bone forms highly complex, branching turbinate structures that dramatically expand surface area to maximize olfactory acuity.

== Clinical significance ==
Fracture of the lamina papyracea, the lateral plate of the ethmoid labyrinth bone, permits communication between the nasal cavity and the orbit on the same side of the body through the inferomedial orbital wall, resulting in orbital emphysema. Increased pressure within the nasal cavity, as seen during sneezing, for example, leads to temporary exophthalmos.

The porous fragile nature of the ethmoid bone makes it particularly susceptible to fractures. The ethmoid is usually fractured from an upward force to the nose. This could occur by hitting the dashboard in a car crash or landing on the ground after a fall. The ethmoid fracture can produce bone fragments that penetrate the cribriform plate. This trauma can lead to a leak of cerebrospinal fluid into the nasal cavity. These openings allow opportunistic bacteria within the nasal cavity to enter the sterile environment of the central nervous system (CNS), which can lead to meningitis or intracranial abscess.

An ethmoid fracture can also sever the olfactory nerve. This injury results in anosmia (loss of smell). A reduction in the ability to taste is also a side effect because it is based so heavily on smell. This injury is not fatal, but can be dangerous, as when a person fails to smell smoke, gas, or spoiled food. In fact, older people with anosmia were more than four times as likely to die in five years compared to those with a healthy sense of smell.

== Additional images ==
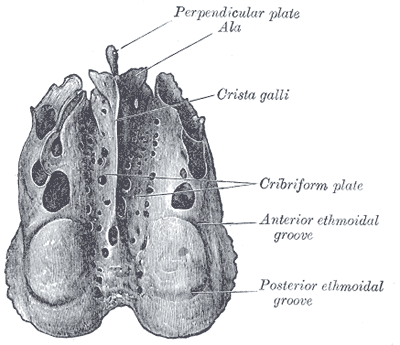
Ethmoid bone from above

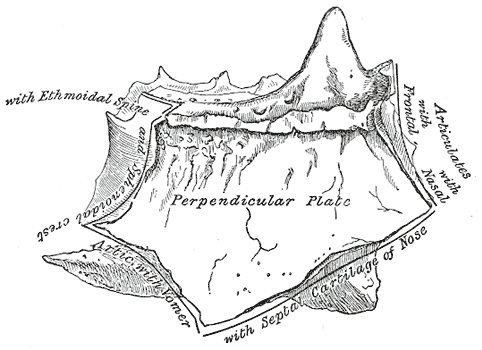
Perpendicular plate of ethmoid

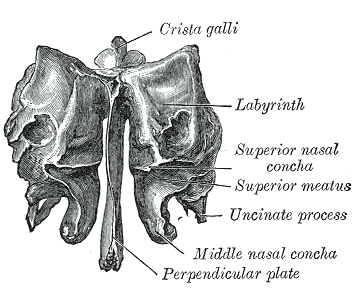
Ethmoid bone (view from behind)

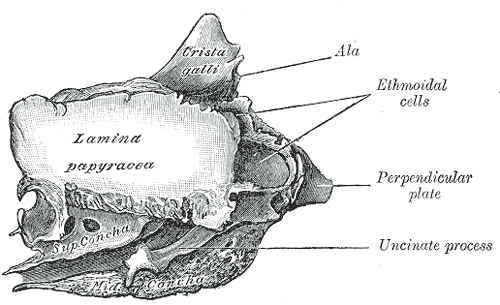
Ethmoid bone from the right side

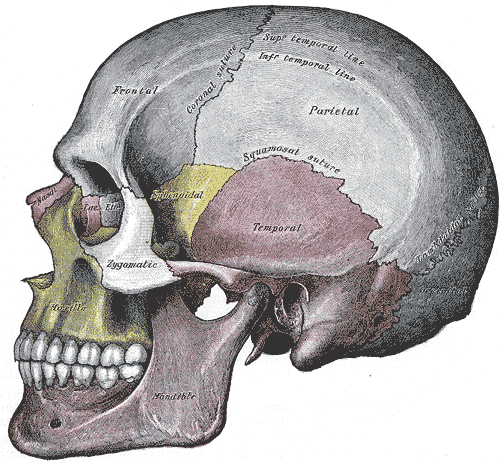
Side view of the skull
