= Nasal surgery =

Nasal Surgery
- Pronunciation: ˈnā-zəl ˈsərj-rē
- MeSH: D059747

Nasal surgery is a medical procedure designed to treat various conditions that cause nasal blockages in the upper respiratory tract, for example nasal polyps, inferior turbinate hypertrophy, and chronic rhinosinusitis. It encompasses several types of techniques, including rhinoplasty, septoplasty, sinus surgery, and turbinoplasty, each with its respective postoperative treatments. Furthermore, nasal surgery is also conducted for cosmetic purposes. While there are potential risks and complications associated, the advancement of medical instruments and enhanced surgical skills have helped mitigate them.

== History ==
The history of nasal surgery can be separated into three periods. The first was when nasal operations only consisted of the repair of minimal external nose injuries. The second period was characterised by the need for restoring amputated noses in several countries. The third period marks the current era of nasal surgery development.

The first period of nasal surgery was dated back to 1500 B.C. There were no attempts to treat nasal damage, leading to complete loss of the nose. Nose amputation served as penalisation for war criminals and women deemed indecent, resulting in the demand for nasal reconstruction.

In view of the situation, Sushruta, regarded as the "Father of Plastic Surgery'', initiated the second period of nasal surgery. Under the ideologies of Ayurveda in 600 B.C., he used leaves as a template for the damaged nose, together with a cheek skin flap to reconstruct wounded noses. This laid a solid foundation for the evolution of nasal surgery. The emerging idea of nasal surgery has then spread to the Roman Empire and other parts of the world.

The third period of nasal surgery continues to this day with the subcategories of rhinoplasty, septoplasty, sinus surgery, and turbinoplasty coupled with the culmination of advanced plastic technology and the ongoing surgical development.

== Types of nasal surgery ==
Nasal surgery is a specialty including the removal of nasal obstruction that cannot be achieved by medication and nasal reconstruction. Currently, it comprises four approaches, namely rhinoplasty, septoplasty, sinus surgery, and turbinoplasty, targeted at different sections of the nasal cavity in the order of their external to internal positions.

=== Rhinoplasty ===
Rhinoplasty is one of the most common cosmetic approaches despite its intricacy. Rhinoplasty can be categorised into surgical rhinoplasty and non-surgical rhinoplasty. Surgical rhinoplasty emphasises the application of grafting techniques while non-surgical rhinoplasty provides non-invasive options.

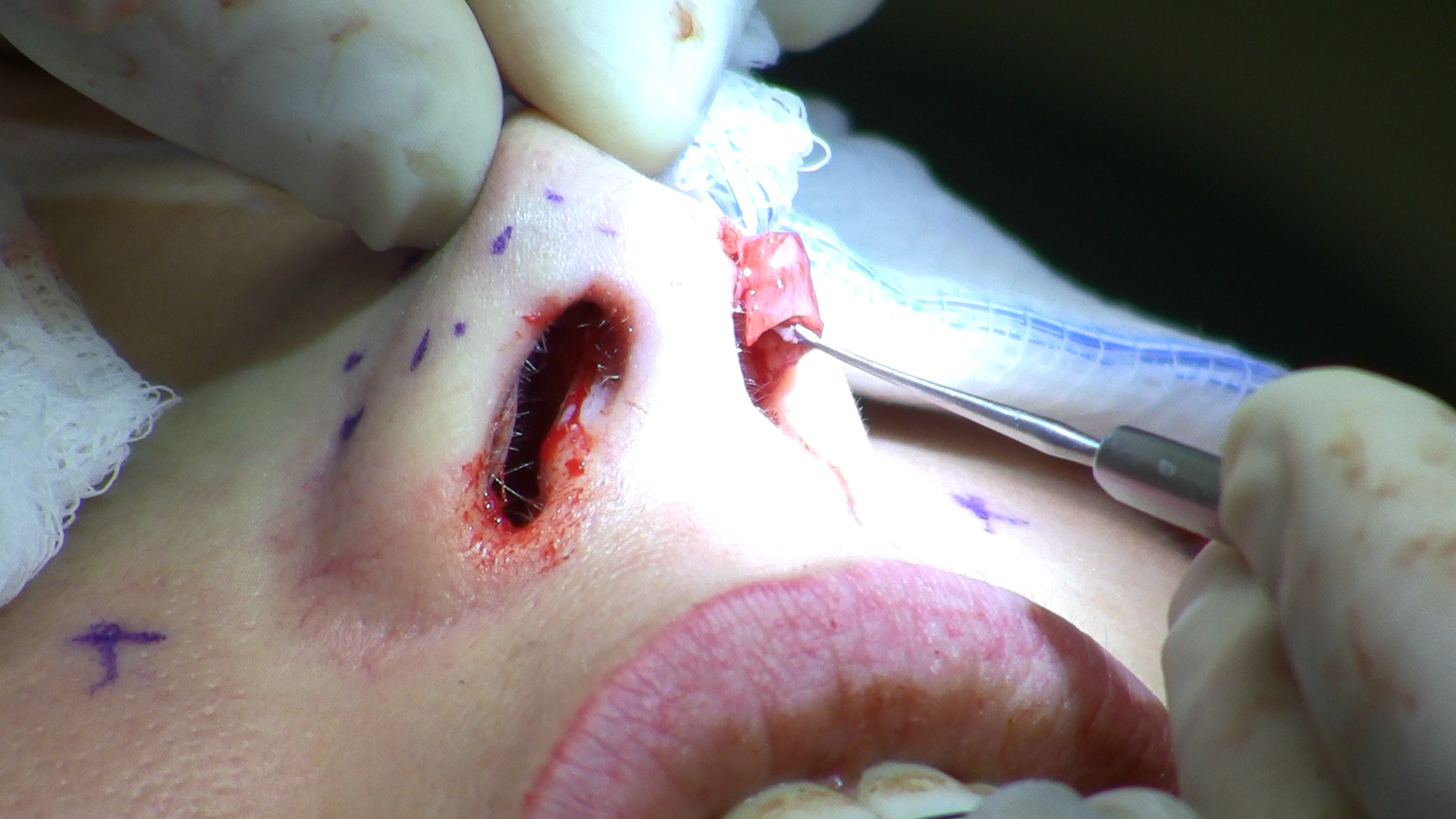
The modification of the lower nasal cartilage of the left nostril during a surgical rhinoplasty procedure.

==== Surgical rhinoplasty ====
Surgical rhinoplasty is an intervention aimed at modifying the nasal appearance in patients. This procedure targets the upper nasal bone and the lower cartilage. First, an incision is carried out at the nasal floor under local or general anaesthesia. During the process, the nasal bones and cartilage are carefully readjusted, with the duration depending on the amount of bone and cartilage that needs to be removed or added with flaps or tissue grafts. Surgeons can retrieve smaller tissue grafts from the interior of the nose, while larger ones may be taken from ribs, implants, or other long bones of the patient. Additionally, another factor under consideration is the patient's ethnicity.

There are two main strategies involved for surgical rhinoplasty – open rhinoplasty and closed rhinoplasty. Open rhinoplasty offers a more accessible passage for the surgeon to incise the outer nasal skin, but it may introduce external scarring on the nose. Contrarily, closed rhinoplasty utilises the endoscopic approach through the nostril and does not require an incision observable to the eye. The decision between the two depends on the extent of growth abnormalities and the patient's preference.

==== Non-surgical rhinoplasty ====
Non-surgical rhinoplasty (liquid rhinoplasty) is a method that incorporates hyaluronic acid dermal fillers and other non-surgical devices, which act as alternatives for minor nasal reconstructions. They are proven to treat minor external nasal injuries more cost-effectively in comparison to surgical rhinoplasty. With respect to the reduced intraoperative loss of tissue and blood, non-surgical rhinoplasty is capable of preventing the occurrence of ischemia or even sepsis.

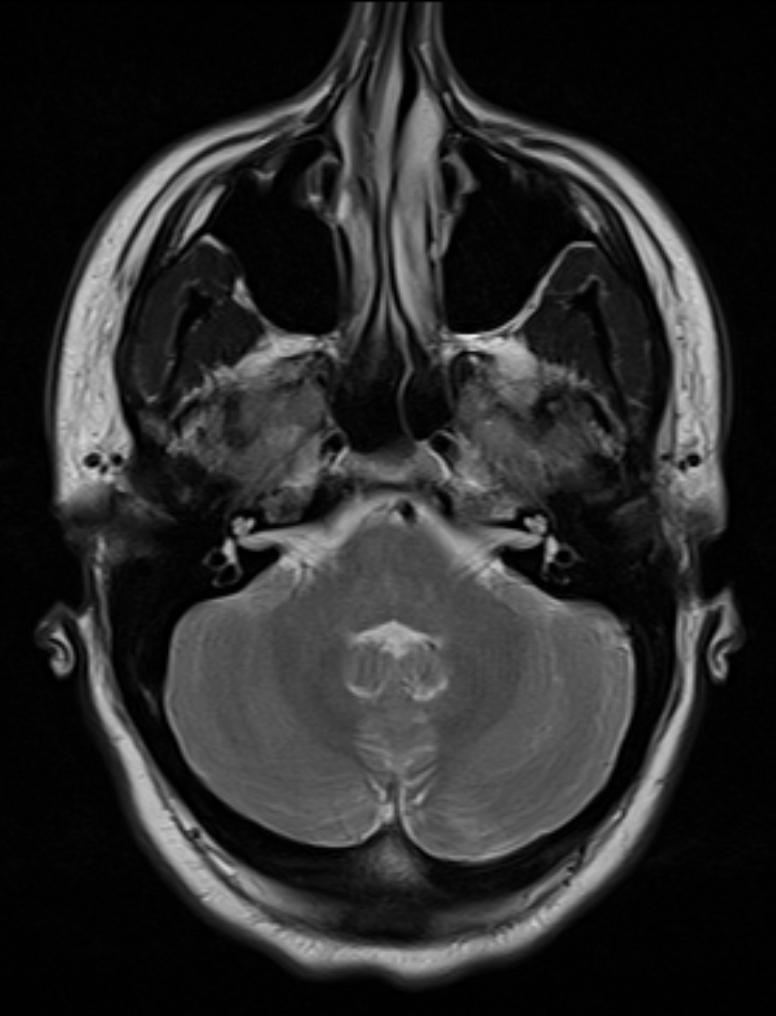
A congenitally deviated nasal septum shown on Magnetic Resonance Imaging (MRI), which can be corrected by septoplasty.

=== Septoplasty ===
Septoplasty is a surgical procedure involving the correction of the nasal septum, which refers to the bone and cartilage dividing the space between the nostrils. When a nasal septum is bent or crooked, it indicates the narrowing or blockage of the airway, leading to breathing difficulties and worsened sinus infections due to poor drainage.

During septoplasty, the surgeon first lifts the mucous membrane enclosing the septum to visualise and assess the cartilage and bone. The surgeon then trims, reshapes or even replaces deviated parts to straighten the nasal septum. A septoplasty typically takes one to three hours and is coupled with other nasal surgeries to ameliorate the defect. The nasal septum is hence repositioned along the midline of one's nose.

Most septoplasties are typically done with a closed procedure that utilises a thin, flexible endoscope with a tiny camera and a light. In certain cases, septorhinoplasty, which is the combination of rhinoplasty and septoplasty, requires an open procedure with a headlight and nasal speculum to fix the nasal septum.

=== Sinus surgery ===
The techniques of sinus surgery vary from ethmoidectomy to balloon sinuplasty. They treat chronic sinusitis and nasal polyps by reopening the sinus passageways.

==== Ethmoidectomy ====
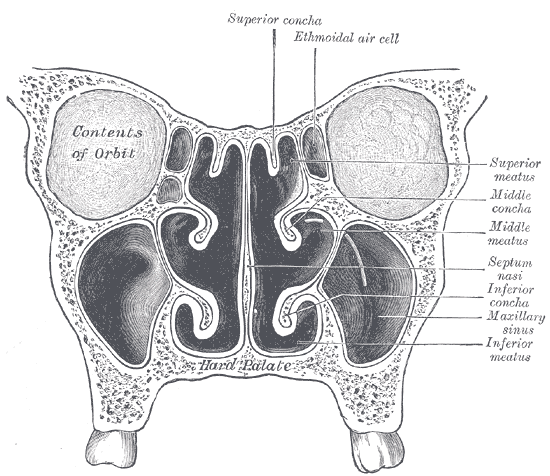
The coronal section of nasal cavities showing the ethmoid sinus, which is a hollow space near the nose and the eyes that allows drainage of other sinuses.

Ethmoidectomy treats ethmoid sinusitis through removing the inflamed mucosal lining on the ethmoid sinus. The method of conducting ethmoidectomy is classified based on the location of the incision, namely external, intranasal, and transantral approaches.

===== External ethmoidectomy =====
The surgeon carries out an incision on the skin between the medial canthus and the medial palpebral ligament, in which the ligament may be repositioned afterwards. The surgeon then dissects the periosteum and a portion of the anterior ethmoid. By perforating the lamina papycracea, the floor of the ethmoidal bulla can be subsequently resected. With the opening of the posterior ethmoid, the surgeon proceeds with the elimination of the inflamed mucus.

===== Intranasal ethmoidectomy =====
Intranasal ethmoidectomy (Functional Endoscopic Sinus Surgery) is the most predominant type of ethmoidectomy with a success rate of 79%. First, the patient is injected with local anaesthetic and adrenaline to decongest the nasal cavity. Next, the middle turbinate is cautiously medialised to render the cribriform plate intact. The dissection of the infundibulum allows the removal of the uncinate process. With a more accessible view of the ethmoid bulla, the remaining fragments are eliminated along the lamina papyrcea. The use of an endoscope facilitates the dissection from the anterior to posterior ethmoid.

===== Transantral ethmoidectomy (Caldwell-Luc approach) =====
Transantral ethmoidectomy is a surgical treatment for recurrent chronic rhinosinusitis and malignant tumours of the maxillary sinus. The operation begins with a puncture through the canine fossa, allowing the surgeon to view the bulging of the ethmoid bulla in the maxillary sinus. Then, an aperture on the inferior nasal meatus is created for intranasal counter drainage. The surgeon eventually dissects the inflamed anterior and posterior ethmoid cells.

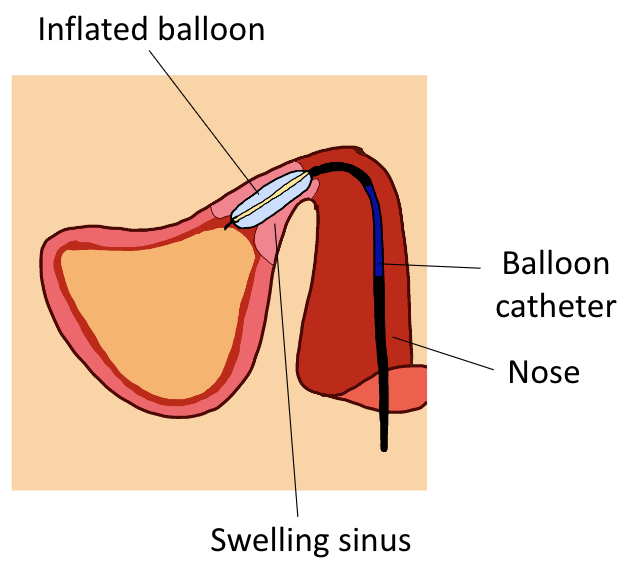
The working principle of balloon sinuplasty. A balloon catheter is inserted into the swelling sinus and inflated, which enables reopening of the sinus passage.

==== Balloon sinuplasty ====
Balloon sinuplasty is an optimal treatment for chronic rhinosinusitis. A flexible balloon catheter is initially inserted into the inflamed sinus. Next, the inflation of the balloon widens the sinus while preserving the lining. Consequently, the expanded opening aids mucosal drainage. After the removal of the balloon, the irrigation catheter sprays saline on the inflamed sinus to expel the pus. Given the simplicity of the process, around 87% of balloon sinuplasty was conducted as an outpatient procedure, with a duration of approximately thirty minutes and a recovery of one to two days.

=== Turbinoplasty ===
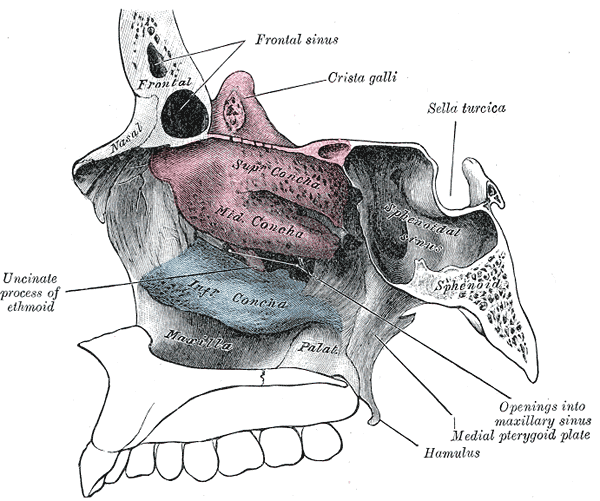
The lateral section of the nasal cavity showing the superior, middle, and inferior nasal conchae (turbinates).

Turbinoplasty is an intervention aiming to treat turbinate hypertrophy by reducing turbinate volume. Turbinate hypertrophy is commonly characterised by enlarged nasal turbinates arising from allergic rhinitis. This procedure has a success rate of 82% and can be carried out in a clinic as a same-day procedure.

Turbinoplasty is classified as intraturbinoplasty and extraturbinoplasty. Intraturbinoplasty only involves the resection of soft tissue, while extraturbinoplasty also removes a portion of the inferior turbinate bone. Intraturbinoplasty can be conducted through an improved mucosal-sparing approach with microdebrider or radiofrequency, thus alleviating postoperative complications.

Turbinoplasty is performed with different equipment shown as follows:

==== Coblation turbinoplasty ====
Coblation turbinoplasty incorporates radiofrequency to vapourise and disintegrate the soft erectile tissue of the turbinate, lowering the turbinate size and causing tissue fibrosis. The reduction in turbinate volume alleviates the conditions of inferior turbinate hypertrophy. Since fibrosis stiffens the attachment of the mucosa to the periosteum, it remedies the shortcomings of possible sequela. According to the review, this technique outcompetes its conventional counterpart in terms of safety and effectiveness.

==== Radiofrequency turbinoplasty ====
First, an incision is carried out on the inferior turbinate bone to allow the insertion of the Piezo. Using an electric current, the Piezo reduces the turbinate volume and prevents direct damage. It is followed by lateralisation of the turbinate by the Mayo scissors. To ameliorate intraoperative bleeding, bipolar cautery is used along with the insertion of a Merocell sponge between the turbinate and nasal septum. It is notably distinctive from coblation turbinoplasty in the absence of saline.

==== Microdebrider turbinoplasty ====
The use of the microdebrider maintains continuous blood drainage, creating a more precise visual field. It also facilitates the specific elimination of the submucosal tissue without damaging the turbinate bone. Besides preserving the mucosa, shorter operative time, lower blood loss, and improved accuracy are significant advancements brought by microdebrider. Also, research found that it is more effective at mitigating nasal blockade than radiofrequency turbinoplasty.

==== Ultrasound turbinoplasty ====
Emerging as a novel technique in sinus surgery, the principle of ultrasound turbinoplasty is highly similar to that of coblation and radiofrequency turbinoplasty. First, an ultrasonic nasal probe is placed along the submucosal lining of the inferior turbinate, and is then moved forward and backward repeatedly. Compared to radiofrequency turbinoplasty, the destruction of swelling tissues by ultrasound exhibits increased nasal flow and minimal postoperative complications.

== Post-operative treatment ==
Patients who have undergone rhinoplasty and septoplasty are placed on bed rest with the head raised. To lower mucus build-up, physicians may prescribe appropriate dosage of corticosteroids at regular intervals for several days. This can therefore reduce the likelihood of postoperative ecchymosis. After the surgery, internal bandages, nasal packs, and silicone splints may be applied to the wound for a week to support the skin grafts and the realigned nasal septum. Doctors can also use a small piece of gauze (drip pad) to absorb any possible drainage on top of the aforementioned.

Ethmoidectomy and turbinoplasty patients are prescribed nasal saline spray. It is applied four to five times daily to remove blood clots and moisturise the nasal cavity. Depending on the patient's conditions, doctors may administer medication ranging from nasal steroids that can alleviate mucosal inflammation to antibiotics that can negate the risk of recurrence.

After three to five days of ethmoidectomy, the physician will eliminate the middle meatus packing and debride the dried blood clots during a follow-up visit. The patient recovers from ethmoidectomy after a month, while the recovery from turbinoplasty takes six weeks.

== Risk and complications ==
Rhinoplasty and septoplasty may precipitate certain issues such as the collapse and perforation of the nasal septal cartilage. The tip projection of nasal alar cartilages may also deviate without adequate support depending on the individual's nasal structure. This will lead to asymmetry and concavity of the nasal sidewall.

Common complications of sinus surgery and turbinoplasty include haemorrhage. Additionally, sinus surgery may potentially result in visual impairment and the leakage of cerebrospinal fluid (CSF). The loss of vision and haemorrhage can be caused by unintentional injuries of the optic nerve and the internal carotid artery in the ethmoid sinus respectively. CSF leakage may lead to meningitis, which is resulted from the fracture of the cribriform plate.

== Current development ==
The Rhinoplasty Outcome Evaluation (ROE) questionnaire is distributed among rhinoplasty patients to examine the results collected. ROE also encourages the application of more innovative techniques, for instance the incorporation of Piezoelectric equipment.

Septoplasty is still considered to be a relatively risky procedure with a high incidence of postoperative complications compared to other types of nasal surgeries. In response to this, specialists in nasal surgery are working to establish a peer-reviewed classification database that can define each type of anomaly involved.

== See also ==
- Rhinoplasty
- Septoplasty
- Ethmoidectomy
- Functional Endoscopic Sinus Surgery
- Balloon sinuplasty
- Turbinoplasty
