= Oroantral fistula =

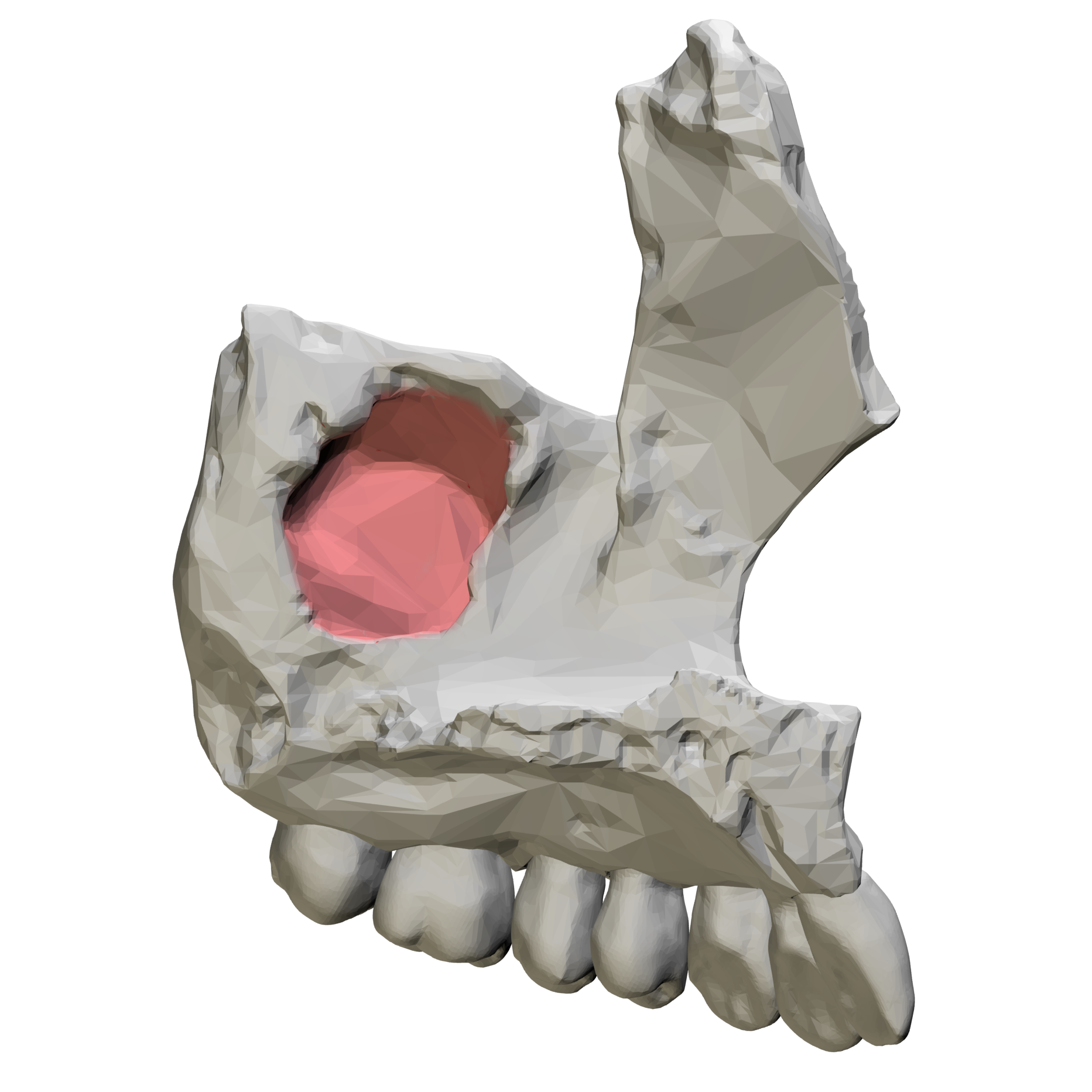
- Maxillary sinus (medial view)
- Specialty: ENT surgery

An oroantral fistula (OAF) is an epithelialized oroantral communication (OAC), which refers to an abnormal connection between the oral cavity and the antrum. The creation of an OAC is most commonly due to the extraction of a maxillary tooth (typically a maxillary first molar) which is closely related to the antral floor. A small OAC up to 5 millimeters may heal spontaneously, but a larger OAC would require surgical closure to prevent the development of a persistent OAF and chronic sinusitis.

== Classification ==
Differences Between Oroantral Communications and Oroantral Fistulas
OAC	OAF
Connection between oral cavity and antrum that is not epithelialised.	Connection between oral cavity and antrum that has epithelialised.
May develop immediately following the extraction of maxillary tooth that is close to antral floor.	Develops from OAC that has not healed spontaneously, has not been closed surgically, or initial attempts at surgical closure have failed.
If the communication is large, surgical treatment is required to prevent the development of a persistent OAF and chronic sinusitis.	Requires surgical treatment to remove and close the fistula.

== Signs and symptoms ==
When looking in the mouth, a communication in the upper jaw (i.e. a hole) can be seen connecting the mouth to the maxillary sinus. Sometimes this can be the only sign, as pain is not always present.

=== Symptoms ===
One symptom is a same-side nose blockage (unilateral nasal obstruction). When an OAC or OAF is present, the passage to the maxillary sinus can results in infection and inflammation. This subsequently results in mucus build up presenting as a unilateral nasal blockage.

Sinusitis may also be present as a pain in the middle of the face. Pain can also be referred to the upper teeth and be mistaken for toothache.

Another symptom is the movement of fluid from the mouth through the communication and into the maxillary sinus, as the maxillary sinus is connected to the nose and therefore fluid can come out of the nostrils when drinking.

There may be variations in the noises made by the voice and nose, particularly a whistling sound made when speaking.

Taste may possibly be affected.

=== Signs ===
A visible hole between mouth and sinus is one of the major signs. There may be fracturing on the floor of the maxillary sinus creating a communication to the oral cavity, which may be seen following trauma. Furthermore, air bubbles, blood, or mucoid secretion around the orifice can be seen as air passes from the sinus into the oral cavity through the communication.

=== Diagnosis ===
Diagnosis is usually based on clinical examination and reported symptoms. Therefore, an understanding of the patient's history and symptoms is crucial in the diagnosis of an oroantral fistula. A Valsalva test (nose blowing test) may also be issued to diagnose an oroantral fistula. In a Valsalva test, the patient is asked to pinch their nostrils together and open their mouth and then blow gently through the nose. The clinician must observe if there is passage of air or bubbling of blood in the post-extraction alveolus, as the trapped air from closed nostrils is forced into the mouth through an oroantral communication. Gentle suction applied to the socket often produces a characteristic hollow sound. However, there are differing opinions about the appropriateness of carrying out this test. By performing it, a small OAC may be made bigger, thus preventing spontaneous healing.

Imaging can also be useful in the diagnostic process; however, radiographs only reveal the fistula if there is a breach in the bony floor of the antrum. Even if there is a breach in the bony floor, then the Schneiderian membrane may still be intact. Depending on the size of the potential communication and in what context, a small radiograph inside the mouth may be sufficient (a periapical) to indicate any break in the bone of the sinus floor which may indicate an OAC.

Panoramic radiographs can also be used to confirm the presence of an OAC. If simple radiographs are deemed not to give enough information, cone beam computed tomography (CBCT) (special x-ray equipment that can scan in 3 dimensions) may be used. Imaging can help locate the communication, determine the size of it and can give an indication as to whether there is any sinusitis and foreign bodies in the sinus.

== Causes ==
=== Extraction of maxillary teeth ===
The maxillary sinus is known for its thin floor and close proximity to the posterior maxillary (upper) teeth. The extraction of a maxillary tooth (typically a maxillary first molar which lies close to the lowest point of antral floor although any premolar or molar can be affected) is the most common cause of an OAC (which can then progress to an OAF as described above). Extraction of primary teeth are not considered a risk of OAC due to the presence of developing permanent teeth and the small size of the developing maxillary sinus.

=== Other causes ===
Other causes of an OAC are maxillary fractures across the antral floor (typically Le Fort I), displacement of posterior maxillary molar roots into antrum, and direct trauma. An OAC can happen for many other more unusual reasons, such as acute or chronic inflammatory lesions around the tip of a tooth root which is in close proximity with the maxillary antrum, destructive lesions/tumors of the maxilla, failure of surgical incisions to heal (e.g. Caldwell-luc antrostomy), osteomyelitis of the maxilla, careless use of instruments during surgical procedures, Syphilis, implants and as a results of complex surgery (for example removal of a large cysts or resections of large tumors) involving the maxilla.

== Diagnosis ==
Clinical examination and x-rays can help diagnose the condition. Tests used to diagnose this condition include:

- Valsalva test (nose blowing test): Ask the patient to pinch the nostrils together and open the mouth, then blow gently through the nose. Observe if there is passage of air or bubbling of blood in the post extraction alveolus as the trapped air from closed nostrils is forced into the mouth through any oroantral communication. Gentle suction applied to the socket often produces a characteristic hollow sound.
- Perform a complete extra- and intra-oral examination using a dental mirror under good lighting, look for granulation tissue in the socket and openings into the antrum.
- Panoramic radiograph or paranasal computed tomography can help to locate the fistula, the size of it and to determine the presence of sinusitis and other foreign bodies. Other methods like radiographs (occipitomental, OPG and periapical views) can also be used to confirm the presence of any oroantral fistulas.
- To test the patency of communication the patient is asked to rinse the mouth or water is flushed in the tooth socket.
- Unilateral epistaxis is seen in case of collection of blood in the sinus cavity.
- Do not probe or irrigate the site, because it may lead to sinusitis or push foreign bodies, such as contaminated fragments, or oral flora further into the antrum. Hence, leading to the formation of a new fistula or widen an existing one.

== Complications ==
OAF is a complication of oroantral communication. Other complications may arise if left untreated. For example:

- Candidal infection
- Chronic maxillary sinus infection of bacterial origin
- Osteomyelitis
- Rhinosinusitis
- Sinus pathology

Hence, OAF should be dealt with first, before treating the complications.

== Prevention ==
Whilst in some circumstances, preventing development of an OAF following extraction of a tooth can be difficult, careful assessment is important. The following should be considered prior to carrying out any dental treatment:

- Size of the antrum and proximity to teeth – this can be assessed radiographically
- Shape and size of teeth and roots – this can be assessed radiographically
- Presence of periapical pathology – this can be assessed radiographically
- The age of the patient
- The patient's past dental history

If the above factors are assessed as increasing the risk of OAC development, the clinician should take appropriate steps to carefully remove the tooth in question, possibly carrying out a surgical extraction and in an appropriate setting. Hence, in such cases:

- Avoid using too much of apical pressure during tooth extraction
- Perform surgical extraction with roots sectioning
- Consider referral to OMFS at local hospital

== Treatment ==
The primary aim of treatment of a newly formed oroantral communication is to prevent the development of an oroantral fistula as well as chronic sinusitis. The decision on how to treat OAC/OAF depends on various factors. Small size communications between 1 and 2 mm in diameter, if uninfected, are likely to form a clot and heal by itself soon. Communications larger than this require treatments to close the defect and these interventions can be categorized into 3 types: surgical, non-surgical and pharmacological.

=== Surgery ===
Surgical methods are required if a large defect is present or if a defect persists. Surgery involves creating a flap utilizing local tissue to close the communication. There are a number of different flaps that can be used such as the buccal advancement flap, the buccal fat pad flap, a combination of the two and a palatal flap. The flap used is mostly dependent on the size and position based on the defect.

==== Buccal advancement flap ====
The buccal advancement flap is the most commonly used due to its simplicity, reliability and versatility. It involves cutting a broad based trapezoid shaped mucoperiosteal flap with two vertical incisions. The flap is cut buccally, is three sided and extends to the full depth of the sulcus.

==== Buccal fat pad flap ====
The buccal fat pad flap is also a popular option due to its high success rate. It is a simple procedure where the buccal extension of the anatomical fat pad is used for closure. These two flaps can be used in combination where the buccal fat pad covers the communication followed by a further covering via the buccal mucosal flap described above. This double layer flap has advantages over a single layer as it provides stable soft tissue covering, reduces the incidence of wound breakdown and defect recurrence as well as reducing the risk of postoperative infection.

Sutures, either non-resorbing or slowly resorbing, are generally used in the surgical repairs of OAC.

=== Non-surgical interventions ===
Ultimately, surgery is usually required to close an OAC/OAF. However, if surgery is not immediately available then non-surgical methods can be used to encourage the growth of oral mucosa between the oral cavity and the antrum. The aim of these methods is to protect the blood clot within the socket and help to prevent infection. One option is construction of a denture with an acrylic base plate or extension of the patient's existing denture to protect the socket and support the clot. These options are particularly helpful in patients who smoke as it provides protection from smoke inhalation. The socket can also be sutured over with mattress sutures if there is adequate soft tissue available.

=== Medication ===
Medications may be needed as an adjunct to assist the closure of the defect. Antibiotics can help control or prevent any sinus infections. Preoperative nasal decongestants usage can reduce any existing sinus inflammation which will aid surgical manipulation of the mucosa over the bone.

=== Postoperative care ===
Following all methods of OAC/OAF closure, the patients are instructed to avoid activities that could produce pressure changes between the nasal passages and oral cavity for at least 2 weeks due to risk of disruption to the healing process. Nose blowing and sneezing with a closed mouth are prohibited. A soft diet is also often advocated during this period. For the purpose of to prevent a postoperative infection, nasal decongestants and prophylactic antibiotics are frequently given subsequent to surgical procedures.
