= Mani H. Zadeh =

English-American otolaryngologist

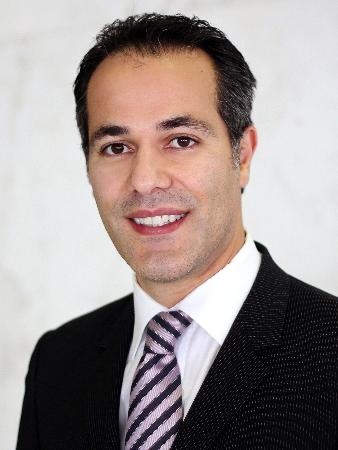
- Education: Columbia University
- Occupation: Otolaryngologist
- Organization(s): L.A. Sinus, AAO-HNS, ACS
- Awards: Super Doctor (2008-2012)
- Website: Mani H. Zadeh Official Website

Mani H. Zadeh is an otolaryngologist-head and neck surgeon and a member of the American Academy of Otolaryngology–Head and Neck Surgery (AAO-HNS) as well as a Fellow of the American College of Surgeons (ACS). He is considered an expert in minimally invasive surgical procedures and specializes in nasal and sinus disorders. He is the author of numerous publications and has been cited by his peers in the medical field, specifically for endoscopic sinus surgery and septal surgery. He is the founder of the L.A. Sinus Institute and has won numerous awards for his field of medicine.

== Education ==
Zadeh was raised in London but came to the United States to attend UCLA. He received his Bachelor of Science degree with honors from UCLA in 1994. He then attended medical school at the university where he earned his Doctorate of Medicine in 1998. Upon receiving his degree, he continued on as an intern in general surgery and a resident in otolaryngology at Columbia University College of Physician and Surgeons. As part of his post-graduate training at Columbia, he served at four different hospitals from 1999 to 2003 including Columbia-Presbyterian Medical Center, New York Hospital – Cornell University Medical Center, St. Luke's Roosevelt Medical Center, and the Memorial Sloan-Kettering Cancer Center. He also served as an intern in general surgery from 1998 to 1999. He received his licensure in New York in 1999 and in California in 2002.

== Career ==
During his career he has worked on numerous research projects on the subjects of sinus disease, head and neck cancer, and hearing loss. From 1993 to 1994, he was involved in Analysis of Morphine Biosynthesis in Mammals at UCLA and from 1995 to 1997 he worked with the National Institute of Health on “Down-Regulation of erB-3 Receptors By Nerve Growth Factor in PC12 Cells.” He worked simultaneously on two projects for the University of San Diego in 1997. The first was for “GDF Protection of Auditory Hair Cells & Ganglion Neurons After Acoustic Trauma” and the other was “Investigating the Spiritual Ganglion Neurite Targeting In Mice With A Targeted Deltion of POU-Domain Transcription Factor Brn-3.0.” He has also worked on projects with the Joan and Sanford I Weill Medical College of Cornell University and Columbia University College of Physicians & Surgeons.

=== L.A. Sinus Institute ===
Zadeh is the founder of the LA Sinus Institute in Los Angeles, California. The institute focuses on providing the residents of Los Angeles and southern California with the most advanced and minimally invasive techniques for the management of nasal and sinus disorders. The Los Angeles Sinus Institute was founded in 2007 with a focus on the treatment of nasal allergies, sinusitis, nasal polyps, turbinate hypertrophy, and deviated nasal septum's. Through the LA Sinus Institute, Dr Zadeh is able to help many patients every year regain their health.

== Awards and honors ==
Zadeh has been the recipient of numerous awards and honors including being named as a California Super Doctor, a recognition received by those who are chosen by their peers in the medical field. He has been voted as such in 2008, 2009, 2010, 2011, and 2012.) He has received honors throughout his career, including numerous honors while he was still a medical student. While in medical school, he was given the NIH Summer Intramural Research Training Award from the National Institutes of Health Research Fellowship in 1995. A year later, he received an Award for Excellence in Research from the Western Student Medical Research Forum in Carmel, California.

Zadeh has received the Distinguished House-Staff Award for Resident or Fellow New York Hospital from Cornell Medical Center and the AAO-HNS Foundation Travel Award in Head and Neck Surgery from the American Academy of Otolaryngology. He was honored in 1999 by the Columbian University College of Physicians and Surgeons with the Arnold P. Gold Humanism and Excellence Training Award. He also received the Award for Excellence in Research from the New York Presbyterian Hospital in 2002. In 2012, he received recognition for outstanding local businesses in the Los Angeles area in the Ear, Nose, & Throat Physicians Category at the 2012 Los Angeles Awards.

== Volunteer work ==
Zadeh volunteers his time as an executive board member of Our House, a grief counseling charity.
