= Giriloyo =

Locality and graveyard in Java, Indonesia

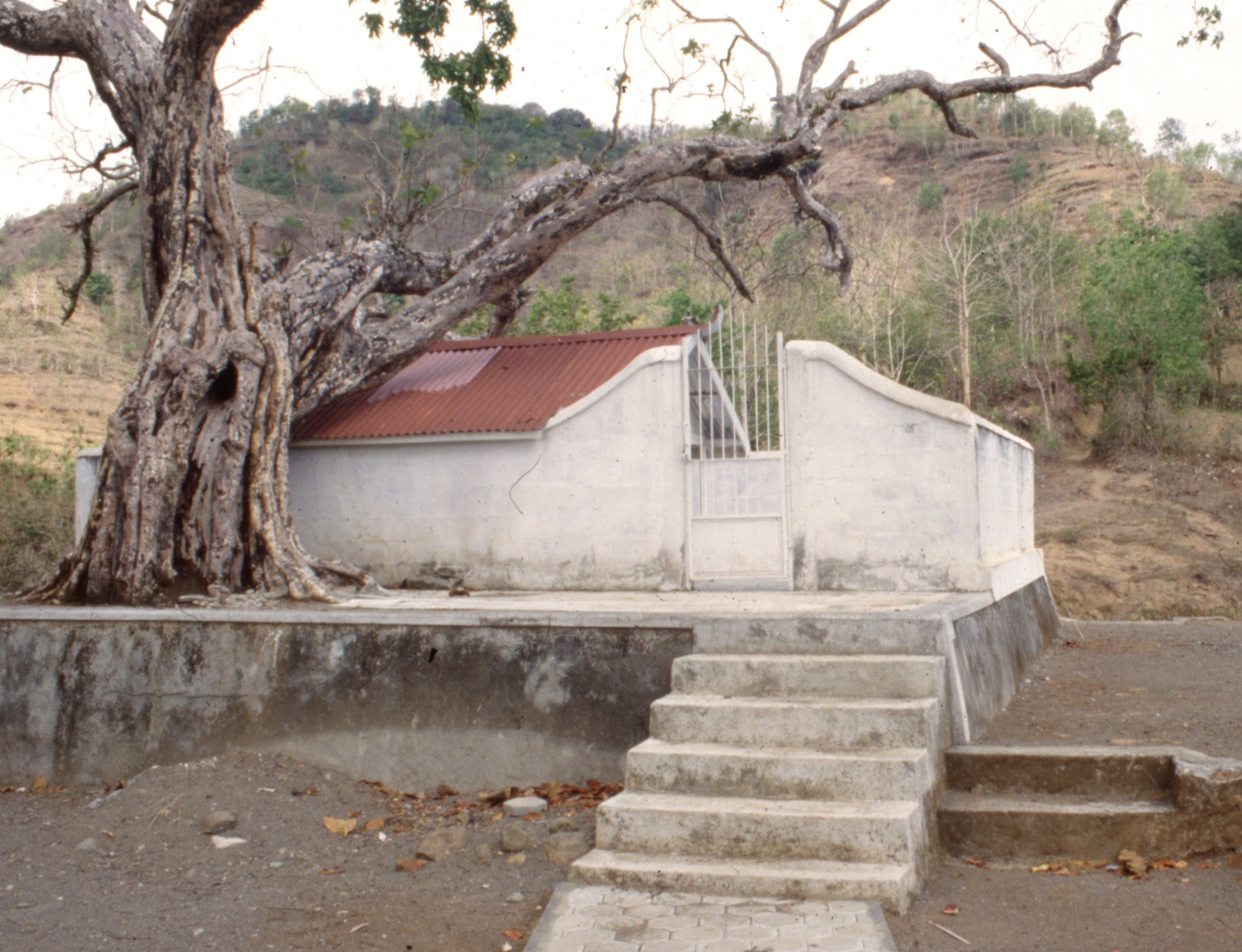
small graveyard part of Giriloyo graveyard complex

Giriloyo is a locality and graveyard in the Wukirsari valley north east of Imogiri, in Bantul Regency, Special Region of Yogyakarta, Indonesia.

The Royal Graveyard at Giriloyo is one of the three graveyards in the Imogiri graveyard complex. Traditionally it is attributed as to being the oldest of the three. Its mosque and walls and graves show older patterns and styles compared to the graveyard to the south – Banyusumurup

It contains graves of relatives of Sultan Agung of Mataram who is considered to be the founder and builder of the main graveyard at Imogiri.

The graveyard like the other two in the complex had much larger numbers of Juru Kunci watching and maintaining the graveyard, when the Yogyakarta and Surakarta palaces had sufficient income to support them.

It also has vital graves that indicate connections with earlier kingdoms – in a manner very similar to what the Royal Graveyard of Kota Gede has within its walls.

The graveyard has minimal visits by tourists, but increasingly local pilgrimage by Javanese on ziarah has seen some of the facilities upgraded to cater for the increased numbers.

The locality or main village has had considerable notoriety as first a place of lurik (cloth) manufacture, In the latter part of the twentieth century Giriloyo became known as a location of Gurah nasal irrigation. This later notoriety has been much more publicised due to the issues of widespread respiratory illnesses contracted in Java, and the possibility that nasal irrigation may be of assistance.

== See also ==
- Banyusumurup
- Girigondo
