= Acclarent =

American healthcare tech company

Acclarent, Inc.
- Type: Subsidiary
- Industry: Health Care
- Founded: 2004; 22 years ago
- Founder: Joshua Makower; John Chang
- Headquarters: Irvine, California, United States
- Key people: Henry J. Abdel-Hopkins (CEO)
- Products: Relieva Balloon Sinuplasty Systems
- Number of employees: 300
- Parent: Ethicon Inc. (2010–24); Integra LifeSciences (2024-present)
- Website: acclarent.com

Acclarent, Inc. began as a privately held, venture-backed company, and is now a subsidiary of Integra LifeSciences. Based in Irvine, Orange County, California. it develops technology for ENT (Ear, Nose and Throat) related illnesses.

== History ==
Founded in 2004. Acclarent has over 300 employees and operates in more than 45 countries. Acclarent’s corporate headquarters are located in the Silicon Valley in Menlo Park, California.

Since inception, the firm has reported more than $103.5M in funding from its venture partners, New Enterprise Associates (NEA), Versant Ventures, Delphi Ventures, Meritech Capital Partners, and Johnson & Johnson Development Corporation.

Acclarent was founded by Joshua Makower who currently serves as Acclarent’s Chairman of the Board. William M. Facteau was the company's President and Chief Operating Officer from November 2004 until March 2012. The company's president is currently Jeff Hopkins.

In May 2005, Acclarent received FDA approval for its Relieva Balloon Sinuplasty technology. The company’s portfolio has more than 40 FDA-approved devices including the Relieva Balloon Sinuplasty systems, comprising the Relieva Ultirra sinus balloon catheters, the Relieva Luma sinus illumination guidewires, the Relieva Vortex which provides deep intra-sinus fluid delivery and strong shear flows to empty sinus contents, and the Cyclops articulating endoscope.

In January 2010, Ethicon Inc., a Johnson & Johnson company, completed the acquisition of Acclarent. In September 2017, the firm received FDA clearance for the Aera balloon, the first ever device to treat chronic eustachian tube dysfunction.

In December 2023, Integra LifeSciences announced they were acquiring Acclarent for $275m. The transaction was completed on April 1, 2024.
