= Josh Makower =

Joshua Makower is an American biomedical engineer and physician.

Makower earned a bachelor's degree in mechanical engineering from the Massachusetts Institute of Technology in 1985, followed by a medical degree at the New York University School of Medicine in 1989, and a master's of business administration in 1993 from Columbia University. He is the Boston Scientific Applied Bioengineering Professor of Medicine and of Bioengineering within Stanford University's School of Medicine and School of Engineering. Makower founded Acclarent in 2004.

In 2018, Makower was elected a fellow of the American Institute for Medical and Biological Engineering. He was elected to membership within the United States National Academy of Engineering in 2021.

In November 2024, Makower was awarded an honorary degree by University of Galway for services to biomedical engineering and medicine.
