= Banyusumurup =

Village and cemetery in Java, Indonesia

Coordinates: 7°55′46″S 110°23′09″E

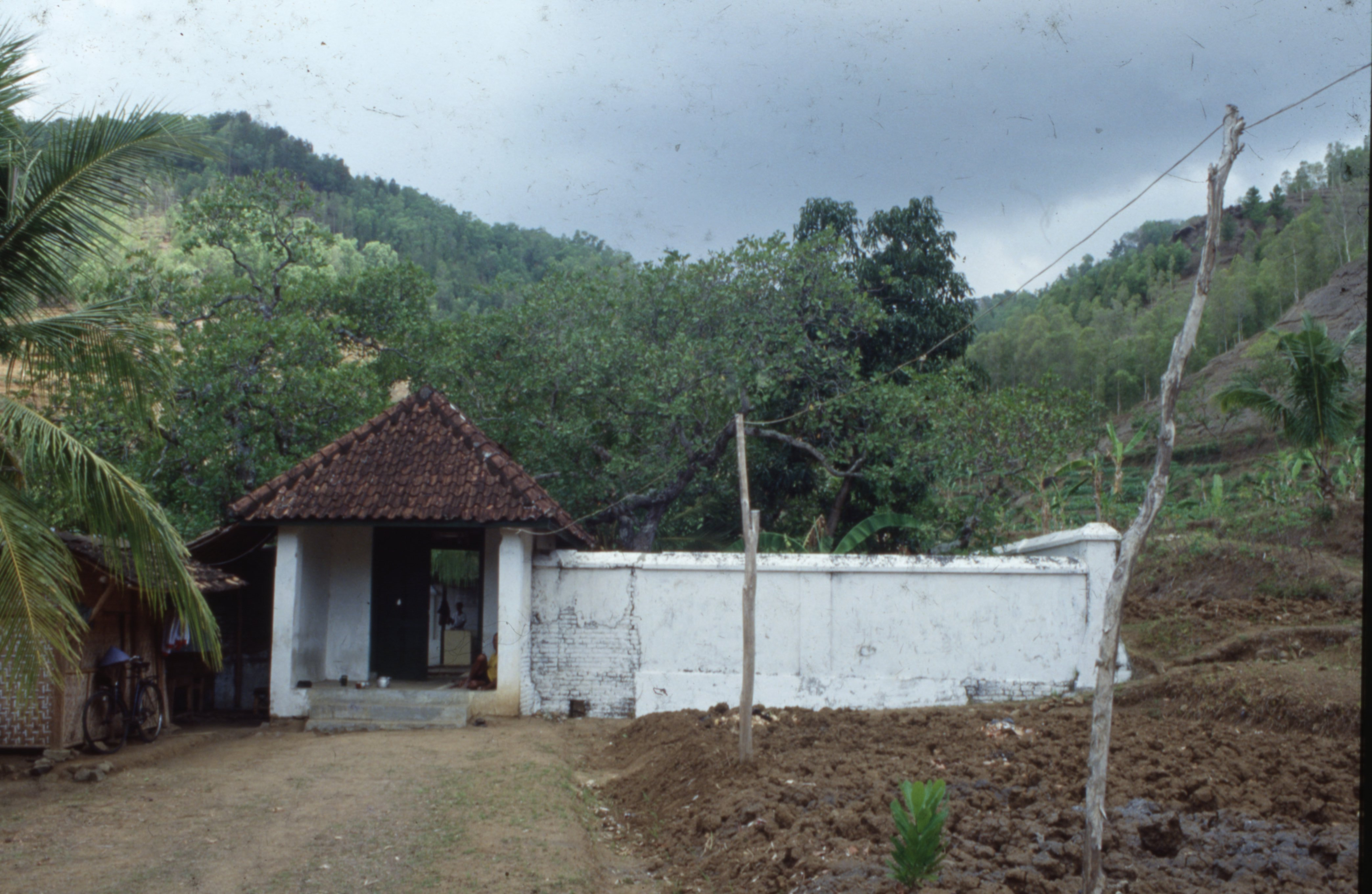
Entrance to graveyard in the 1990s

Banyusumurup is a sub-village (dusun) in Girirejo village, southeast of Imogiri in Bantul Regency, Special Region of Yogyakarta, Indonesia.

The sub-village was acknowledged as a 'kris making' location at some stages in the 20th century.

Banyusumurup is known for Banyusumurup Graveyard, part of the Imogiri Royal Graveyard complex, traditionally associated with being the 'outcast' graveyard of those who fell out of favour with rulers – in most cases in the 17th and 18th centuries, and the Banyusumurup Mosque

== See also ==
- Girigondo
- Giriloyo
- Imogiri
