= Banyusumurup Mosque =

Mosque in Yogyakarta, Indonesia

- ꦩꦱ꧀ꦗꦶꦢ꧀ꦧꦚꦸꦱꦸꦩꦸꦫꦸꦥ꧀ Masjid Banyusumurup

Religion
- Affiliation: Islam
- Branch/tradition: Sunni
- Status: Active

Location
- Location: Banyusumurup graveyard Complex Road №1, Bantul Regency
- Country: Indonesia

Architecture
- Type: Mosque architecture
- Style: Javanese
- Founder: Amangkurat I
- Completed: 1668

The Banyusumurup Mosque (Indonesian: Masjid Banyusumurup) is a historic mosque located within the Banyusumurup Cemetery area, Yogyakarta, Indonesia.

The mosque was built in 1668, during the time of Amangkurat I – the ruler of the Mataram Sultanate – at that time he was also the architect of this mosque.

== History ==
The Banyusumurup graveyard, which is located in a remote valley in the Imogiri area, is a burial site for people who were considered enemies of the state by Amangkurat I, Prince Pekik. In this tomb complex, there are silent witnesses to various intrigues with a background of power struggles and even love struggles between father and child.

The roof of this mosque previously used bamboo, but has now been replaced with tiles . There are original historical remains in this mosque, namely the drum and mustaka which are still firmly installed. In 2000 renovations were carried out, starting from replacing cement - coated tiles with ceramic - coated tiles.
