= Caldwell-Luc surgery =

Operation to remove mucosa of the maxillary sinus

Caldwell-Luc surgery, Caldwell-Luc operation, also known as Caldwell-Luc antrostomy, and Radical antrostomy, is an operation to remove irreversibly damaged mucosa of the maxillary sinus. It is done when maxillary sinusitis is not cured by medication or other non-invasive technique. The approach is mainly from the anterior wall of the maxilla bone. It was introduced by George Caldwell (1893) and Henry Luc (1897). The maxillary sinus is entered from two separate openings, one in the canine fossa to gain access to the antrum and other in the naso antral wall for drainage.

== Medical uses ==
- Chronic damage of cavity of maxilla bone.
- Removal of foreign bodies.
- Malignancy of sinus.
- Fracture of maxilla and/or orbital floor.
- Abnormal growth of mucous membrane of sinus (polyp).
- Dental cyst.
- For management of hematoma or hemorrhage in the maxillary sinus
- To treat fractures involving the floor of the orbit or anterior maxillary sinus wall (transantral repair)

== Contraindications ==
It is rarely done in children as damage to secondary dentition may occur.

== Complications ==
- Bleeding after surgery
- Facial asymmetry
- cheek discomfort
- Damage to teeth

== Procedure ==
=== Anaesthesia ===
The operation may be performed under local anaesthesia but it is commonly carried out under general anaesthesia. The use of topical anaesthesia and injection of adrenaline into soft tissue of canine fossa is recommended.

=== Technique ===
First, the incision is made from lateral incisor to the second molar tooth. Then the flap of mucosa and periosteum is elevated and dissected to expose the anterior wall of sinus and then anterior wall is opened in the canine fossa where the bone is relatively thin with the drill. The opening can be enlarged by hayek or kerrison punch forceps to produce a hole sufficiently large to provide access for example, to allow removal of sinus mucosa or introduction of an endoscope and instruments.

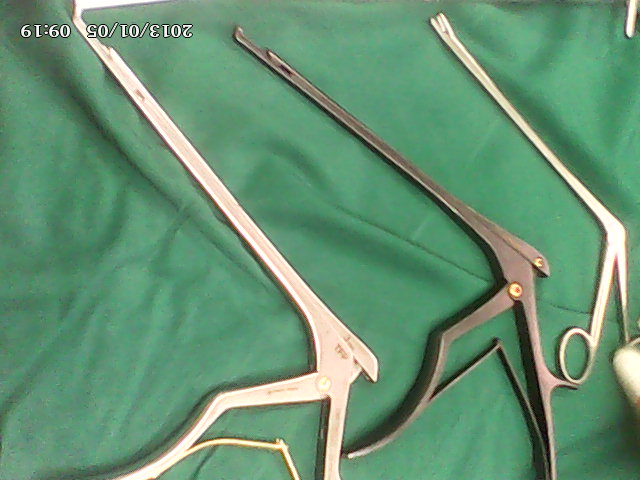
Kerrison punch 02

The entire lining of sinus is dissected and removed as the success of the operation in chronic rhinosinusitis. Packing of nasal cavity and sinus is sometimes required. Suturing of buccal incision is recommended with absorbable suture material.

The patient should be advised against overenthusiastic blowing of the nose for at least a week.

== History ==
It was described by George Caldwell in 1893 and Henry Luc in 1897. They described the operation of maxillary sinus diseases via canine fossa. Functional endoscopic sinus surgery is the standard surgery for maxillary sinusitis nowadays.
