= Ethmoidectomy =

- Specialty: Otorhinolaryngology

Ethmoidectomy is the medical name for a procedure that involves removing the partitions between the ethmoid sinuses in order to create larger sinus cavities. This procedure treats sinus infections and sinus obstructions that have been the cause of chronic sinus problems. The procedure may also involve the removal of nasal polyps present in the ethmoids.
