= Gurah =

Javanese health treatment

Gurah is a Javanese health treatment originating from Bantul, near Yogyakarta. A herb mixture is inserted into the patient's nostrils while he lies on his back. The patient then turns over on his stomach while large quantities of mucus are produced from the nose and mouth.

The treatment is said to cure sinusitis. The treatment typically involves a gurah practitioner, who inserts the preparation into the nose, with a masseuse also performing massage to relax the patient and relieve pain during the typically two-hour-long procedure.

It was developed in 1900 by 'Marzuki' to allow qari, Koran reciters, to speak clearly. Pop singers such as Iwan Fals and government ministers are said to have undergone the treatment.

The key ingredient is Clerodendron serratum spreng tree, known as 'srigunggu'. Saponin, found in sigunggu, acts as a vasodilator, stimulating mucus production. Tannins are also present in the tree.

Gurah has been studied by an ENT specialist from Gadjah Mada University, who said that "a patient with sinusitis will feel relief as the mucus can easily flow through the dilated blood vessels after application of the extract", noting that the practitioner requires the patient to consume water before and after the treatment, due to the large amount of fluid loss through mucus produced. The study showed that the treatment reduced symptoms such as congestion, sneezing and runny noses of chronic sinusitis. However, full medical testing has not been conducted.

Gurah is not recommended for asthmatics or people with heart conditions, and claims of practitioners to remove nicotine from lungs have yet to be tested in a scientific study.

Some oral gurah preparations are sold, but these are more likely to be dangerous than the traditional treatment localised within the nostrils.
