= Balloon sinuplasty =

Treatment of blocked sinuses

Balloon sinuplasty is a procedure that ear, nose and throat surgeons may use for the treatment of blocked sinuses. Patients diagnosed with sinusitis but not responding to medications may be candidates for sinus surgery. Balloon technology was initially cleared by the U.S. Food and Drug Administration in 2005 and is an endoscopic, catheter-based system for chronic sinusitis. It uses a balloon over a wire catheter to dilate sinus passageways. The balloon is inflated with the goal of dilating the sinus openings, widening the walls of the sinus passageway and restoring normal drainage.

== Overview ==
Sinus surgery with balloons may be performed in a hospital, outpatient surgery setting or in the physician’s office under local anesthesia. The physician inserts a guide catheter through the nostril and near the sinus opening under endoscopic visualization. A flexible guide wire is then introduced into the targeted sinus to confirm access. Most guide wires have a light on the tip which may produce light transmission seen through the skin to help the physician with correct placement of the guide wire. Once access to a blocked sinus is confirmed, a balloon catheter is advanced over the guide wire and positioned in the blocked sinus opening for inflation. The balloon is inflated. The entire procedure takes around 31 minutes and if the procedure is successful, the sinus will remain open after the balloon is deflated and removed for up to 24 months.

== Research ==
Since the initial introduction of sinus dilation, a number of clinical studies have explored its safety, effectiveness, durability, and patient benefits. Data from these studies show that, for appropriate patients, sinus dilation has a low complication rate (0.1% complication rate across 8 studies representing approximately 900 patients) and delivers significant, lasting symptom improvement.

To better understand sinus dilation’s role in treatment, many physicians sought a direct comparison of balloon sinus dilation to the current standard of care, functional endoscopic sinus surgery. Outcomes from the first prospective, multi-center, randomized controlled trial with sufficient statistical power to compare sinus dilation to functional endoscopic sinus surgery were published in the American Journal of Rhinology & Allergy in 2013 and 2014. Data from the study shows that balloon sinus dilation is as effective as functional sinus surgery, and delivers a better patient recovery experience. Balloon and surgical patients experienced a similar, significant level of:

- symptom improvement
- decline in number of rhinosinusitis episodes requiring medication in year after treatment
- improvements in work productivity and activity level

Patients who had balloon sinus dilation experienced a much quicker recovery, less bleeding, and less need for prescription pain medication. Overall, data from these studies address key clinical questions, and affirm sinus dilation’s role as an alternative to traditional surgery.

== Benefits ==
The balloon technique is an alternative, less invasive treatment than the traditional functional endoscopic sinus surgery (FESS). The sinuses are dilated with a balloon instead of using metal instruments to cut and remove tissue to increase the openings. Because of less risk and fewer complications, balloon sinuplasty can be performed in the office under local anesthesia. This opens up an avenue of treatment for patients with sinus disease who otherwise would not be candidates for surgery secondary to age, health conditions, previous reactions to general anesthesia, or fear of "going under". For the right patient, this procedure can have the same degree of impact on reduction of symptoms as the formal surgery.

== Limitations ==
Balloon sinuplasty may not be appropriate for all chronic and recurrent sinusitis patients. Clinical studies have typically excluded patients with:

- Eosinophilic disease
- Severe polyposis or fungal sinusitis
- Severe septal deviation
- Cystic fibrosis
- Aspirin-exacerbated respiratory disease
- Facial trauma
