= Canine fossa =

Depression in the jaw

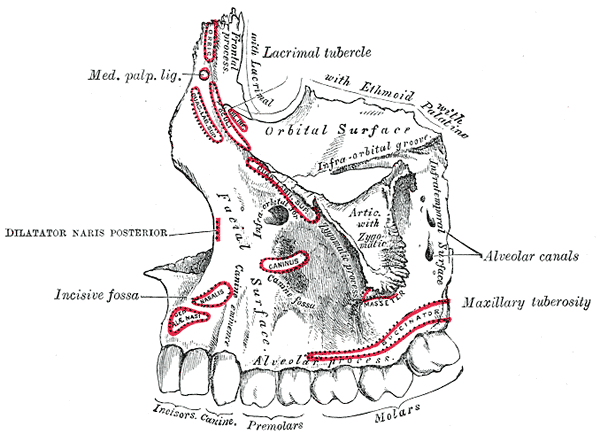
- Left maxilla. Outer surface.

Details

Identifiers
- Latin: fossa canina
- TA98: A05.1.03.061; A02.1.12.009
- TA2: 764
- FMA: 56762

The canine fossa is a depression lateral to the incisive fossa of the maxilla in the musculoskeletal anatomy of the human head. It is larger and deeper than the comparable incisive fossa, and it is separated from it by a vertical ridge, the canine eminence, corresponding to the socket of the canine tooth. The levator anguli oris arises from the canine fossa.

== See also ==
- Fossa
