= Functional endoscopic sinus surgery =

Surgery to enlarge the paranasal sinus drainage pathways

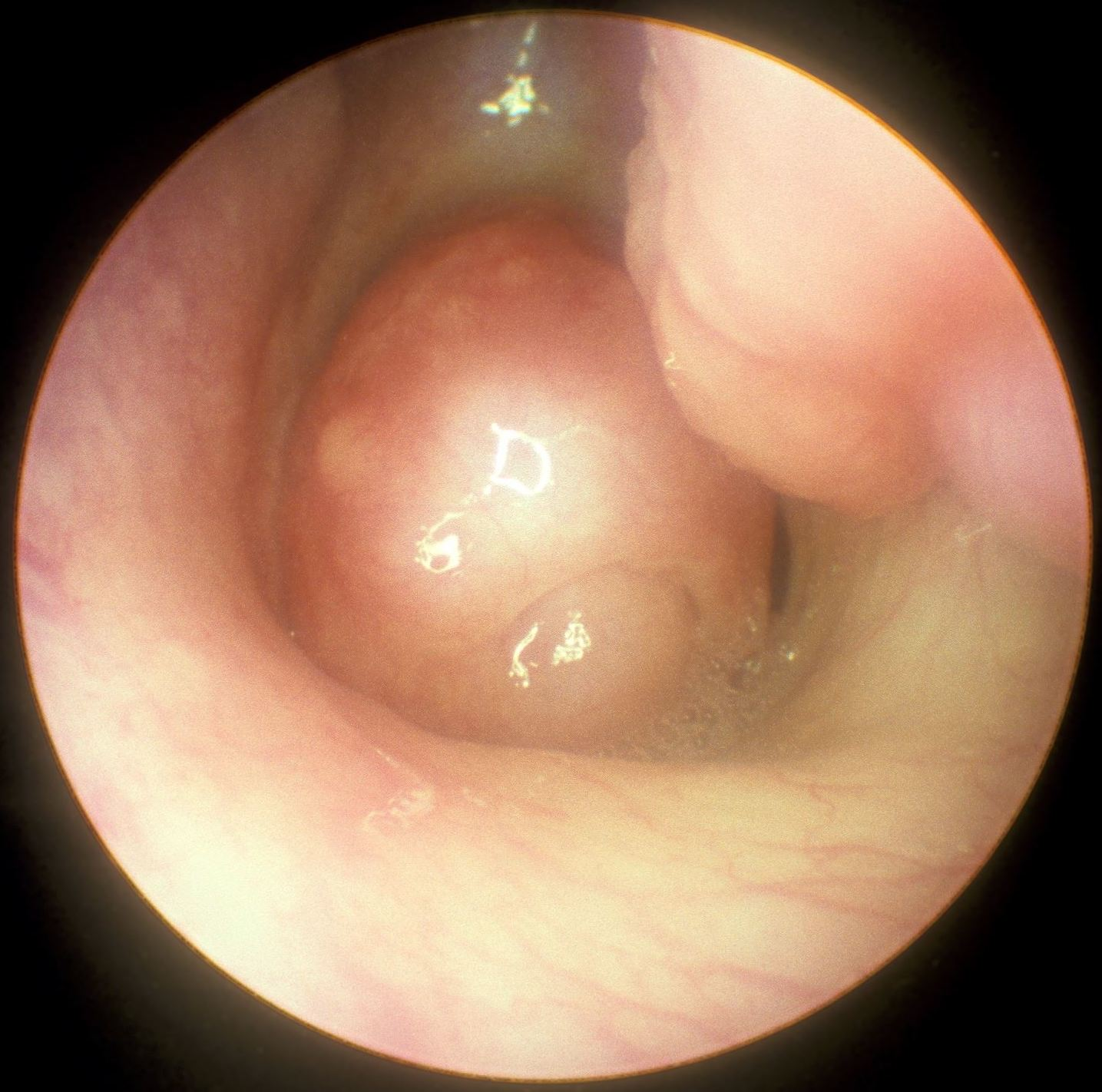
- Large nasal polyp (round mass, center), which is commonly treated and removed by FESS
- ICD-9-CM: 22.11

Functional endoscopic sinus surgery (FESS) is a procedure that is used to treat sinusitis and other conditions that affect the sinuses. Sinusitis is an inflammation of the sinuses that can cause symptoms such as congestion, headaches, and difficulty breathing through the nose.

FESS is a minimally invasive procedure that is performed using an endoscope, a thin, rigid tube with a camera on the end. The endoscope is inserted through the nostrils, allowing the surgeon to visualize the inside of the nasal passages and sinuses. The surgeon can then remove any tissue or obstruction that is blocking the sinuses, such as swollen or infected tissue.

FESS is generally considered to be a safe and effective treatment for sinusitis and other conditions that affect the sinuses. It can help to alleviate symptoms and improve the overall functioning of the sinuses. However, as with any medical procedure, there are potential risks and complications that should be discussed with a healthcare provider.

== History ==
The first recorded instance of endoscopy being used to visualize the nasal passage took place in Berlin in 1901. Alfred Hirschmann, a designer and maker of medical instruments, modified a cystoscope for use in the nasal cavity. In October 1903, Hirschmann published "Endoscopy of the nose and its accessory sinuses." In 1910, M. Reichart performed the first endoscopic sinus surgery using a 7 mm endoscope.

In 1925, Maxwell Maltz created the term "sinuscopy," referring to the endoscopic method of visualizing the sinuses. Maltz also encouraged the use of endoscopes as a diagnostic tool for nasal and sinus abnormalities.

In the 1960s, Harold Hopkins, then a PhD at the University of Reading, used his background in physics to develop an endoscope that provided more light and had drastically better resolution than previous endoscopes. Hopkins' rod optic system is widely credited with being a turning point for nasal endoscopy. Utilizing Hopkins' rod optic system, Walter Messenklinger visualized, recorded, and mapped the anatomy of the paranasal sinuses and the lateral nasal walls - specifically, the mucociliary routes - in cadavers. In 1978, Messerklinger published the book titled "Endoscopy of the Nose" on his findings, and his proposed methods to utilize nasal endoscopy for diagnosis.

Heinz Stammberger, a head and neck surgeon and chair of otolaryngology at the University of Graz where he worked with Messerklinger, was interested by the technique and its implications for pathophysiology and treatment of sinus disease. He adopted the technique, becoming identified with it, and traveled the world to advocate for it. After meeting David Kennedy, a physician at Johns Hopkins University, he worked with him and the surgical instrument maker Karl Storz to develop instruments for use in endoscopic sinus surgery, and coined the term Functional Endoscopic Sinus Surgery. Stammberger and Kennedy published multiple papers on FESS use and technique, and in 1985 the first North American course on FESS was taught at Johns Hopkins Hospital in Baltimore.

There was a rise in the overall number of endoscopic sinus surgery procedures performed between 2010 - 2019 in the UK which coincided with a reduction in the number of open procedures performed over the same period.

== The mechanical model and historical context ==
The endoscopic approach to sinus surgery was developed in the 1970s by Heinz Stammberger and Walter Messerklinger in Graz, Austria, and brought to wider international attention largely through the work of David Kennedy at the University of Pennsylvania. Early conceptualization of the procedure was grounded in the physiology of mucociliary clearance: by addressing obstruction at the ostiomeatal complex — the anatomical confluence through which the anterior sinuses drain — normal physiological drainage could, in theory, be restored. The term "functional" was itself a deliberate statement of intent, distinguishing the approach from the more radical ablative operations that had preceded it.

For roughly the first two decades of widespread adoption, the primary outcome measures used to evaluate FESS reflected this mechanical framework. Surgeons assessed patency of the middle meatus, resolution of mucosal edema on CT imaging, and patient-reported symptom scores understood largely in structural terms. The question of what happened after surgery — how the mucosal environment was managed, and whether topical agents could reach operated cavities — received comparatively little systematic attention.

== The limitations of the mechanical model ==
Chronic rhinosinusitis is now understood to be a disease driven predominantly by mucosal inflammation rather than by anatomical obstruction alone. Epidemiological and pathophysiological research, accumulated over the past two decades, has made clear that structural abnormalities such as a deviated nasal septum or concha bullosa are neither necessary nor sufficient to produce sinusitis in most patients. The mucosal inflammatory process — involving eosinophilic infiltration, disrupted epithelial barrier function, and in many patients a type 2 immune response — persists after surgery regardless of how completely the anatomy has been addressed.

This has significant implications. If surgery creates open sinus cavities but the underlying inflammatory milieu is unchanged, symptomatic recurrence is predictable. Clinical experience bears this out: long-term outcome data consistently show that the most important predictor of sustained improvement after FESS is not the thoroughness of the dissection but adherence to postoperative medical management, principally with topical intranasal corticosteroids. The surgery, in this reading, does not treat the disease directly. It alters the anatomy in ways that make treatment possible.

== FESS as a platform for topical drug delivery ==
=== The problem of access ===
The anatomy of the paranasal sinuses makes topical drug delivery inherently difficult in unoperated patients. The natural ostia of the maxillary, frontal, and sphenoid sinuses are small, variably positioned, and functionally oriented to expel rather than admit material from the nasal airway. Scintigraphic and computational fluid dynamics studies have demonstrated that in the intact nose, the vast majority of topically applied solution — whether administered as a spray, drop, or irrigation — is deposited on the nasal floor and anterior nasal passages and does not reach the middle meatus in meaningful quantities, let alone penetrate into the sinus cavities themselves.

This anatomical barrier is not merely a matter of clinical inconvenience. It means that patients with chronic rhinosinusitis (CRS) who use topical corticosteroids as prescribed are largely delivering drug to normal nasal mucosa while the inflamed sinus lining — the actual target tissue — remains untreated. The therapeutic effect of intranasal steroid in unoperated patients with polyp disease likely reflects, at least in part, drug deposition on polypoid tissue that has prolapsed into the nasal cavity rather than penetration of the sinuses proper.

=== The surgical transformation of delivery ===
Endoscopic sinus surgery materially changes this situation. By removing polyps, opening sinus ostia, and in many cases performing middle meatal antrostomy, uncinectomy, and ethmoidectomy, the surgeon creates a continuous patent channel between the nasal airway and the sinus cavities. The mechanical consequence of this is not only improved mucociliary drainage — it is dramatically enhanced access for topically applied agents.

Deposition studies conducted in the postoperative setting have confirmed this effect experimentally. Using radiolabeled solutions delivered by large-volume saline irrigation, researchers found that penetration into the maxillary and ethmoid sinuses increased substantially following FESS compared with the unoperated state, with some studies reporting increases in intranasal deposition to operated sites exceeding 300 percent relative to the same patient's preoperative baseline. The volume and delivery method of the irrigation matters considerably: large-volume, low-pressure systems (typically 240 mL or more, delivered via squeeze bottle or positive-pressure device) consistently outperform sprays and drops in achieving sinus penetration, and this difference is amplified in operated patients, where the opened anatomy acts as a conduit rather than a barrier.

Work from Harvey and colleagues at the University of New South Wales, published across multiple studies in the 2010s, was particularly influential in systematizing this understanding. Their group demonstrated that posture, irrigation volume, and the degree of surgical opening each independently influenced the proportion of delivered solution reaching target sinonasal sites — a finding that prompted reconceptualization of what the surgery was actually for.

=== Corticosteroid irrigation post-FESS ===
The practical consequence of improved access is that topical corticosteroids delivered via large-volume irrigation — so-called steroid rinses — become genuinely therapeutic after surgery in a way that spray formulations directed at the intact nose are not. Budesonide respules and mometasone furoate, both off-label for this route of administration in many jurisdictions, are the agents most commonly used; betamethasone and fluticasone preparations have also been studied. Administered via squeeze bottle or NeilMed-style irrigation systems, these solutions can bathe the mucosal surface of operated sinuses directly, suppressing the eosinophilic inflammatory activity that would otherwise drive recurrence.

Clinical trials examining outcomes in patients who performed regular postoperative steroid irrigation versus saline alone have demonstrated benefits in endoscopic appearance, symptom scores, and time to recurrence of polyps. The benefit appears dose-dependent to a degree, and is substantially attenuated in patients with poor operative access — underscoring the dependence of pharmacological efficacy on surgical adequacy.

Systemic absorption of topically administered corticosteroids via this route is low but not negligible, particularly in patients with large residual mucosal surfaces, bilateral polyposis, or compromised mucosal integrity. This consideration does not generally preclude use in adult patients with normal adrenal function, though it warrants attention in children and in those receiving other corticosteroid preparations concurrently.

=== Long nozzle delivery ===
The use of long-nozzle intranasal delivery systems for corticosteroids and saline irrigation following endoscopic sinus surgery has been proposed as a method to improve topical drug penetration into the paranasal sinuses. Conventional short-nozzle nasal sprays tend to deposit medication predominantly within the nasal vestibule, limiting effective distribution to the surgically opened sinus cavities. In a cadaveric study published in 2019, Muaaz Tarabichi, Mustafa Kapadia, and colleagues compared a conventional short nozzle with a custom-designed long and narrow nozzle using radiolabeled saline and SPECT/CT imaging. The investigators demonstrated that the long nozzle delivered medication beyond the maxillary line and toward the olfactory cleft more consistently than standard devices, while significantly reducing deposition within the nasal vestibule. The study supported the hypothesis that bypassing the nasal valve area through a longer nozzle design could enhance sinonasal drug delivery in post-endoscopic sinus surgery patients, potentially improving the effectiveness of topical corticosteroid therapy in chronic rhinosinusitis management.

=== Steroid-eluting implants ===
A further development in the pharmacological delivery paradigm has been the introduction of biodegradable, drug-eluting implants designed to be placed directly within the sinus cavity at the time of surgery or in the clinic setting postoperatively. These devices represent the logical endpoint of the delivery-platform model: rather than relying on the patient to introduce drug into surgically opened sinuses, they provide sustained local drug release from within the surgical site over a defined period.

The Propel family of implants (Intersect ENT, subsequently acquired by Medtronic) uses a mometasone furoate–eluting polymer scaffold placed in the ethmoid cavity after surgery. Studies supporting their use demonstrated reductions in postoperative adhesion formation, delayed polyp regrowth, and reduced need for postoperative oral corticosteroids or revision surgery. The implants dissolve over approximately thirty days, releasing drug in controlled fashion to adjacent mucosal surfaces. A later variant, Sinuva, was developed for in-office placement into the maxillary sinus without general anesthesia in previously operated patients with recurrent polyposis.

The regulatory approval pathway for these devices required demonstration of drug effect rather than merely a structural or mechanical benefit, reinforcing the reconceptualization of FESS-related interventions as pharmacological delivery mechanisms rather than purely anatomical operations.

== Implications for surgical technique and extent ==
If drug delivery to the sinus mucosa is understood as a primary objective of FESS, rather than a secondary benefit, this has direct implications for intraoperative decision-making. The adequacy of a surgical opening is no longer measured purely by whether it restores theoretically normal mucociliary flow but by whether it creates access sufficient for postoperative topical therapy. An ostium that is opened to three or four millimeters may be physiologically patent in a narrow mechanical sense while still being insufficient for meaningful postoperative drug penetration.

This reasoning supports the trend toward more generous antrostomies and complete ethmoidectomies in patients with severe or recurrent polyposis, even when such completeness goes beyond what would be required to restore drainage alone. It also informs discussion of extended procedures — Draf III frontal sinusotomy (the endoscopic modified Lothrop procedure), mega-antrostomy, and sphenoidotomy — as interventions that improve topical access as much as they improve ventilation. The choice of surgical extent becomes, in part, a decision about the pharmacological environment being created for long-term disease management.

== Integration with biologic therapies ==
The pharmacological delivery paradigm has acquired additional relevance with the introduction of biologic agents targeting the type 2 inflammatory pathway — dupilumab, mepolizumab, omalizumab, and related monoclonal antibodies — for the treatment of severe CRS with nasal polyposis. These agents act systemically and do not require local delivery. Nonetheless, their relationship to surgery remains an active area of investigation.

Several lines of evidence suggest that surgery and biologics are complementary rather than competing strategies in patients with severe disease. Surgery reduces the total inflammatory burden and polyp load, improving nasal airflow and restoring access for topical therapy, while biologics address the immune dysregulation that surgery cannot correct. Whether patients who respond well to biologics still benefit from surgery — and conversely whether surgery enhances biologic efficacy — is a question that has not been fully resolved in prospective trials, though observational data support the combination in carefully selected patients.

== Current conceptual status ==
The conceptual reframing of FESS as a drug delivery procedure, rather than a mechanical corrective operation, represents one of the more significant shifts in rhinological thinking over the past two decades. It has practical consequences for how surgeons counsel patients, how extent of dissection is justified, how postoperative regimens are structured, and how outcomes are measured. It also has implications for healthcare systems: if the purpose of the surgery is partly to enable topical pharmacotherapy, then failure to provide or support that pharmacotherapy in the postoperative period compromises the value of the surgical investment.

The model is not without limitations. Drug delivery is not the only, or in some anatomical regions the primary, rationale for surgical intervention; restoration of frontal sinus drainage, for example, involves considerations that go beyond topical access. And the pharmacological benefit of improved access remains incompletely characterized in terms of specific drug, concentration, volume, frequency, and duration — parameters that vary considerably in clinical practice and have not been standardized. Ongoing research continues to refine understanding of how to maximize therapeutic benefit from the combination of surgical and medical intervention in chronic sinonasal disease.

== See also ==
- Chronic rhinosinusitis
- Nasal polyposis
- Mucociliary clearance

== Medical applications ==
Functional endoscopic sinus surgery is most commonly used to treat CRS, only after all non-surgical treatment options such as antibiotics, topical nasal corticosteroids, and nasal lavage with saline solutions have been exhausted. CRS is an inflammatory condition in which the nose and at least one sinus become swollen and interfere with mucus drainage. It can be caused by anatomical factors such as a deviated septum or nasal polyps (growths), as well as infection. Symptoms include difficulty breathing through the nose, swelling and pain around the nose and eyes, postnasal drainage down the throat, and difficulty sleeping. CRS is a common condition in children and young adults.

The purpose of FESS in treatment of CRS is to remove any anatomical obstructions that prevent proper mucosal drainage. A standard FESS includes removal of the uncinate process, and opening of the ethmoid air cells and Haller cells as well as the maxillary ostium, if necessary. If any nasal polyps obstructing ventilation or drainage are present, they are also removed. In the case of paranasal sinus/nasal cavity tumors (benign or cancerous), an otolaryngologist can perform FESS to remove the growths, sometimes with the help of a neurosurgeon, depending on the extent of the tumor. In some cases, a graft of bone or skin is placed by FESS to repair damages by the tumor.

In the thyroid disorder known as Graves' ophthalmopathy, inflammation and fat accumulation in the orbitonasal region cause severe proptosis. In cases that have not responded to corticosteroid treatment, FESS can be used to decompress the orbital region by removing the ethmoid air cells and lamina papyracea. Bones of the orbital cavity or portions of the orbital floor may also be removed.

The endoscopic approach to FESS is a less invasive method than open sinus surgery, which allows patients to be more comfortable during and after the procedure. Entering the surgical field via the nose, rather than through an incision in the mouth as in the previous Caldwell-Luc method, decreases risk of damaging nerves which innervate the teeth. Because of its less-invasive nature, FESS is a common option for children with CRS or other sinonasal complications.

It has been suggested that one of the main objectives in FESS surgery is to allow for the introduction of local therapeutic agents (such as steroids) to the sinuses. Research has shown that a special modification of the nozzle of the nasal spray in patients who had FESS allows for better delivery of local therapeutic agents into the ethmoid sinuses.

== Outcomes and complications ==
Functional Endoscopic Sinus Surgery is considered a success if most of the symptoms, including nasal obstruction, sleep quality, olfaction and facial pain, are resolved after a 1–2 month postoperative healing period. Reviews of FESS as a method for treating chronic rhinosinusitis have shown that a majority of patients report increased quality of life after undergoing surgery. The success rate of FESS in treating adults with CRS has been reported as 80-90%, and the success rate in treating children with CRS has been reported as 86–97%.

The most common complication of FESS is cerebrospinal fluid leak (CSFL), which has been observed in about 0.2% of patients. Generally, CSFL arises during surgery and can be repaired with no additional related complications postoperatively. Other risks of surgery include infection, bleeding, double vision usually lasting a few hours, numbness of the front teeth, orbital hematoma, decreased sense of smell, and blindness. The medial rectus muscle may be damaged. Blindness is the single most serious complication of FESS, and results from damage to the optic nerve during surgery. Serious complications such as blindness occur in only 0.44% of cases, as determined by a study performed in the United Kingdom.

A Cochrane review in 2006 based on three randomized control trials concluded that FESS has not been shown to provide significantly better results than medical treatment for chronic rhinosinusitis. Another Cochrane review looked at postoperative care of patients after FESS using debridement (removal of blood clots, crusts, and secretions from the nasal and sinus cavities under local anaesthetic), but the evidence from the available clinical trials was uncertain. The debridement procedure after FESS may make little or no difference to health‐related quality of life or disease severity. There may be a lower risk of adhesions but whether this has any impact on long‐term outcomes is unknown.

== Overutilization of Functional Endoscopic Sinus Surgery in Patients With Headache ==
The widespread adoption of functional endoscopic sinus surgery (FESS) during the 1990s and early 2000s coincided with increasing concern regarding the diagnosis of “sinus headache.” During this period, many patients presenting primarily with facial pain or headache underwent sinonasal surgery despite limited objective evidence of chronic rhinosinusitis. The term “sinus headache” became commonly applied to a broad range of headache syndromes, particularly migraine and tension-type headache, leading to substantial diagnostic overlap between rhinology and neurology.

Subsequent neurologic and rhinologic studies demonstrated that a large proportion of patients who believed they suffered from sinus headache actually fulfilled International Headache Society criteria for migraine. Migraine-associated autonomic symptoms such as nasal congestion, rhinorrhea, lacrimation, and facial pressure contributed significantly to this confusion. As a result, many patients underwent computed tomography imaging, septoplasty, turbinate reduction, or FESS without clear inflammatory sinonasal disease.

A landmark contribution to this subject was made by Dr. Muaaz Tarabichi through his study Characteristics of Sinus-Related Pain, published in Otolaryngology–Head and Neck Surgery in 2000. In this work, Tarabichi analyzed 82 patients with radiographic and endoscopic evidence of chronic sinusitis who underwent FESS for facial pain. The study demonstrated that 38% of patients continued to experience facial pain one year after surgery despite successful resolution of sinus disease, suggesting that a substantial proportion of these patients suffered from non-sinonasal headache disorders rather than true rhinogenic pain.

Tarabichi further demonstrated that sinus-related pain possesses clinical characteristics distinct from primary headache disorders. Patients whose pain genuinely improved after sinus surgery typically described pressure-like, dull, bilateral periorbital pain associated with nasal obstruction and prolonged inflammatory symptoms rather than pulsatile headache, nausea, photophobia, or visual aura. Importantly, the study also showed that neither the severity nor location of pain correlated with the extent or location of sinus disease on imaging. These findings challenged earlier assumptions that mucosal abnormalities or anatomic variations alone were sufficient explanations for chronic headache syndromes.

The study became influential because it provided one of the earliest systematic analyses distinguishing rhinogenic facial pain from primary neurologic headache disorders within a surgical population. Tarabichi concluded that “non-sinus causes account for the headache in one of three patients undergoing sinus surgery,” a finding that significantly influenced subsequent discussions regarding surgical indications for FESS in patients presenting primarily with headache.

Later reviews in rhinology and neurology literature increasingly emphasized that headache alone should not be considered an indication for endoscopic sinus surgery in the absence of objective endoscopic or radiologic evidence of inflammatory disease. This represented a shift away from earlier concepts of “contact point headache” and poorly defined sinus headache syndromes toward more evidence-based diagnostic criteria.

Contemporary rhinology guidelines generally recommend that FESS be reserved for medically refractory chronic rhinosinusitis supported by objective findings on nasal endoscopy and computed tomography imaging. The work of Tarabichi and others contributed significantly to the recognition that many patients historically diagnosed with “sinus headache” in fact suffered from migraine or other primary headache disorders, thereby helping reduce unnecessary sinonasal surgery.
