= Sinusitis =

Inflammation of the sinus' membranes

Rhinosinusitis
- Other names: Sinus infection, sinusitis, chronic rhinosinusitis without nasal polyps, chronic rhinosinusitis with nasal polyps
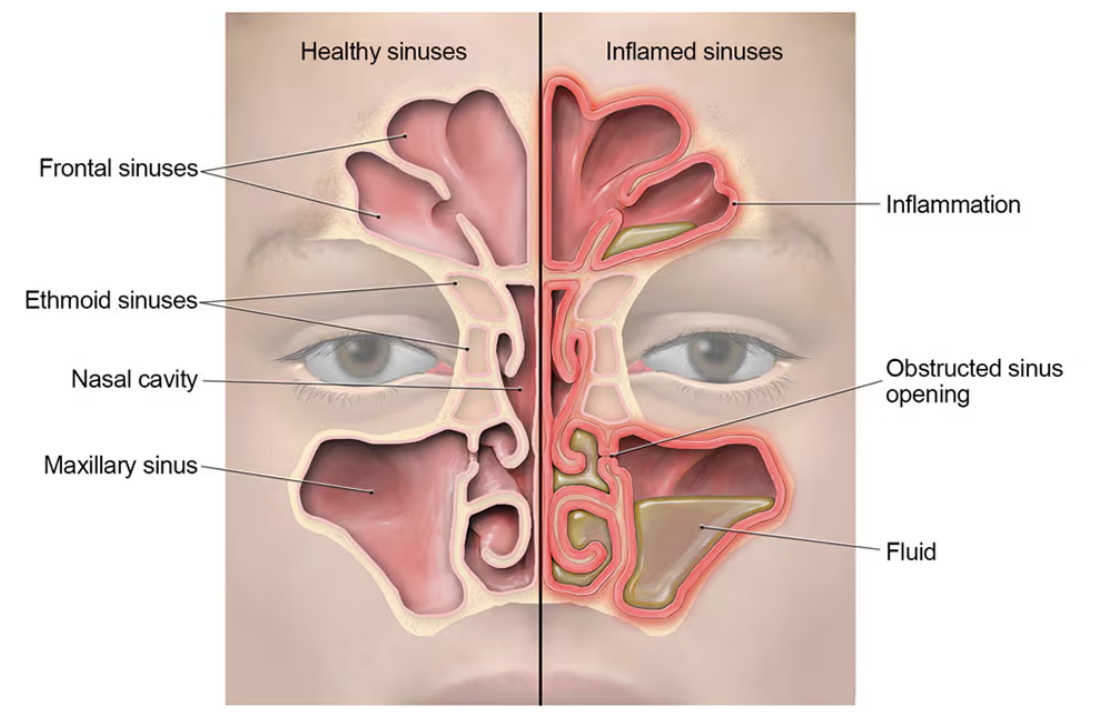
- An illustration showing the difference between healthy sinuses and diseased sinuses
- Specialty: Otorhinolaryngology, family medicine
- Symptoms: Nasal discharge, nasal blockage, facial pain, reduction or loss of smell, fever
- Causes: Infection (bacterial, fungal, viral), allergies, air pollution, structural problems in the nose
- Risk factors: Asthma, cystic fibrosis, poor immune function
- Diagnostic method: Usually based on symptoms
- Differential diagnosis: Common cold, rhinitis, upper respiratory infection, temporomandibular joint disorder, tension headache, vascular headache, dental infection
- Prevention: Handwashing, vaccinations, avoiding smoking
- Treatment: Pain medications, nasal steroids, nasal irrigation, antibiotic
- Frequency: 10–30% each year (developed world)

Sinusitis, also known as rhinosinusitis and commonly known as a sinus infection, is an inflammation of the mucous membranes that line the sinuses resulting in symptoms that may include production of thick nasal mucus, nasal congestion, facial congestion, facial pain, facial pressure, loss of smell, or fever.

Sinusitis is a condition that affects both children and adults. It is caused by a combination of environmental and health factors. It can occur in individuals with allergies, exposure to environmental irritants, structural abnormalities of the nasal cavity and sinuses and poor immune function. Most cases are caused by a viral infection. Recurrent episodes are more likely in people with asthma, cystic fibrosis, and immunodeficiency.

A diagnosis of sinusitis is based on the symptoms and their duration along with signs of disease identified by endoscopic and/or radiologic criteria. Sinusitis is classified into acute sinusitis, subacute sinusitis, and chronic sinusitis. In acute sinusitis, symptoms last for less than four weeks, and in subacute sinusitis, they last between 4 and 12 weeks. In chronic sinusitis, symptoms must be present for at least 12 weeks. In the initial evaluation of sinusitis an otolaryngologist, also known as an ear, nose and throat (ENT) doctor, may confirm sinusitis using nasal endoscopy. Diagnostic imaging is not usually needed in the acute stage unless complications are suspected. In chronic cases, confirmatory testing is recommended by use of computed tomography.

Prevention of sinusitis focuses on regular hand washing, staying up-to-date on vaccinations, and avoiding smoking. Analgesics such as naproxen, nasal steroids, and nasal irrigation may be used to help with symptoms. Recommended initial treatment for acute sinusitis is watchful waiting. If symptoms do not improve in 7–10 days or worsen, then an antibiotic may be implemented or changed. In those in whom antibiotics are indicated, either amoxicillin or amoxicillin/clavulanate is recommended first line, with amoxicillin/clavulanate being superior to amoxicillin alone but with more side effects. Surgery may be recommended in those with chronic disease who have failed medical management.

Sinusitis is a common condition. It affects between about 10 and 30 percent of people each year in the United States and Europe. The management of sinusitis in the United States reportedly results in more than $11 billion in costs.

== Signs and symptoms ==
Acute sinusitis can present as facial pain and tenderness that may worsen on standing up or bending over, headache, cough, bad breath, nasal congestion, ear pain, ear pressure or nasal discharge that is usually green in color, and may contain pus or blood. Dental pain can also occur. A way to distinguish between toothache and sinusitis is that sinusitis-related pain is usually worsened by tilting the head forward or performing the Valsalva maneuver.

Chronic sinusitis presents with more subtle symptoms of nasal obstruction, with less fever and pain. Symptoms include facial pain, headache, night-time coughing, an increase in previously minor or controlled asthma symptoms, general malaise, thick green or yellow nasal discharge, feeling of facial fullness or tightness that may worsen when bending over, dizziness, aching teeth, and bad breath. Often, chronic sinusitis can lead to anosmia, the loss of the sense of smell.

A 2005 review suggested that most "sinus headaches" are migraines. The confusion occurs in part because migraine involves activation of the trigeminal nerves, which innervate both the sinus region and the meninges surrounding the brain. As a result, accurately determining the site from which the pain originates is difficult. People with migraines do not typically have the thick nasal discharge that is a common symptom of a sinus infection.

=== By location ===
The four paired paranasal sinuses are the frontal, ethmoidal, maxillary, and sphenoidal sinuses. The ethmoidal sinuses are further subdivided into anterior and posterior ethmoid sinuses, the division of which is defined as the basal lamella of the middle nasal concha. In addition to the severity of disease, sinusitis can be classified by the sinus cavity it affects:

- Maxillary – may cause pain or pressure in the maxillary (cheek) region, often experienced as a toothache or headache.
- Frontal – may cause pain or pressure in the frontal sinus cavity (above the eyes), often experienced as a headache, particularly in the forehead area.
- Ethmoidal – may cause pain or pressure between or behind the eyes, along the sides of the upper nose (medial canthi), and headaches.
- Sphenoidal – may cause pain or pressure behind the eyes, though it is often felt at top of the head, over the mastoid processes, or the back of the head.

=== Complications ===
Chandler classification
Stage	Description
I	Preseptal cellulitis
II	Orbital cellulitis
III	Subperiosteal abscess
IV	Orbital abscess
V	Cavernous sinus septic thrombosis

Complications are thought to be rare (1 case per 10,000). Infectious complications of acute bacterial sinusitis include eye, brain and bone complications.

==== Orbital complications ====
The Chandler classification is used to group orbital complications into five stages based on their severity. Stage I, known as preseptal cellulitis, occurs when an infection develops in front of the orbital septum. It is thought to result from restricted venous drainage from the sinuses and affects the soft tissue of the eyelids and other superficial structures. Stage II, known as orbital cellulitis, occurs when infection develops behind the orbital septum and affects the orbits. This can result in impaired eye movement, protrusion of the eye, and eye swelling. Stage III, known as subperiosteal abscess, occurs when pus collects between walls of the orbit and the surrounding periosteal structures. This can result in impaired eye movement and acuity. Stage IV, known as orbital abscess, occurs when an abscess forms within the orbital tissue. This can result in severe vision impairment. Stage V, known as cavernous sinus thrombosis, is considered an intracranial complication. It can occur as bacterial spread progresses, triggering blood clots that become trapped within the cavernous sinus. This can result in symptoms within the opposite eye and, in severe cases, meningitis.

==== Intracranial complications ====
The proximity of the sinuses to the brain makes brain infections one of the most dangerous complications of acute bacterial sinusitis, especially when the frontal and sphenoid sinuses are involved. These infections can result from invasion of anaerobic bacteria through the bones or blood vessels. Abscesses, meningitis, and other life-threatening conditions may occur. In rare cases, mild personality changes, headache, altered consciousness, visual problems, seizures, coma, and even death may occur.

==== Osseous complications ====
A rare complication of acute sinusitis is a bone infection, known as osteomyelitis, which affects the frontal and other facial bones. Specifically, the combination of frontal sinusitis, osteomyelitis and subperiosteal abscess formation is referred to as Pott's puffy tumor.

==== Other complications ====
When an infection originating from a tooth or dental procedure affects the maxillary sinus it can lead to odontogenic sinusitis. Odontogenic sinusitis can often spread to nearby sinuses including the ethmoid, frontal, sphenoid sinuses, and the contralateral nasal cavity. In rare instances, these infections may spread to the orbit, leading to orbital cellulitis.

== Causes ==
=== Acute ===
Acute sinusitis is usually precipitated by an earlier upper respiratory tract infection, generally of viral origin, mostly caused by rhinoviruses (with RVA and RVC giving more severe infection than RVB), coronaviruses, and influenza viruses, others caused by adenoviruses, human parainfluenza viruses, human respiratory syncytial virus, enteroviruses other than rhinoviruses, and metapneumovirus. If the infection is of bacterial origin, the most common three causative agents are Streptococcus pneumoniae (38%), Haemophilus influenzae (36%), and Moraxella catarrhalis (16%). Until recently, H. influenzae was the most common bacterial agent to cause sinus infections. However, introduction of the H. influenzae type B (Hib) vaccine has dramatically decreased these infections, and now non-typable H. influenzae (NTHI) is predominantly seen in clinics. Other sinusitis-causing bacterial pathogens include S. aureus and other streptococci species, anaerobic bacteria and, less commonly, Gram-negative bacteria. Viral sinusitis typically lasts for 7 to 10 days.

Acute episodes of sinusitis can also result from fungal invasion. These infections are typically seen in people with diabetes or other immune deficiencies (such as AIDS or transplant on immunosuppressive antirejection medications) and can be life-threatening. In type I diabetics, ketoacidosis can be associated with sinusitis due to mucormycosis.

=== Chronic ===
==== Definition and nomenclature ====
By definition, chronic sinusitis lasts longer than 12 weeks and can be caused by many different diseases that share chronic inflammation of the sinuses as a common symptom. It is subdivided into cases with and without polyps. When polyps are present, the condition is called chronic hyperplastic sinusitis; however, the causes are poorly understood. It may develop with anatomic derangements, including deviation of the nasal septum and the presence of concha bullosa (pneumatization of the middle concha) that inhibit the outflow of mucus, or with allergic rhinitis, asthma, cystic fibrosis, and dental infections.

Chronic rhinosinusitis represents a multifactorial inflammatory disorder, rather than simply a persistent bacterial infection. The medical management of chronic rhinosinusitis is focused upon controlling the inflammation that predisposes people to obstruction, reducing the incidence of infections. Surgery may be needed if medications are not working.

During nasal endoscopy, an accessory maxillary ostium can sometimes be observed in the middle meatus. While not all are functionally active, in certain cases, mucus exiting the natural maxillary ostium may re-enter the sinus through the accessory ostium. This mucus recirculation may be associated with chronic maxillary sinusitis.

Attempts have been made to provide a more consistent nomenclature for subtypes of chronic sinusitis. The presence of eosinophils in the mucous lining of the nose and paranasal sinuses has been demonstrated in many people, and this has been termed eosinophilic mucin rhinosinusitis (EMRS). Cases of EMRS may be related to an allergic response, but allergy is not often documented, resulting in further subcategorization into allergic and nonallergic EMRS.

==== Fungi ====
A more recent, and still debated, development in chronic sinusitis is the role that fungi play in this disease. Whether fungi are a definite factor in the development of chronic sinusitis remains unclear, and if they are, what is the difference between those who develop the disease and those who remain free of symptoms. Trials of antifungal treatments have had mixed results.

==== One airway theory ====
Recent theories of sinusitis indicate that it often occurs as part of a spectrum of diseases that affect the respiratory tract (the "one airway" theory) and is often linked to asthma.

==== Smoking ====
Both smoking and secondhand smoke are associated with chronic rhinosinusitis.

==== Air pollution ====
Exposure to fine particulate matter (PM2.5), which consists of particles with a diameter of less than 2.5 micrometers, has been associated with an increased risk of developing rhinosinusitis. PM2.5 particles can penetrate deep into the respiratory tract, reaching the nasal and sinus mucosa, leading to inflammation and impaired mucociliary clearance. Individuals living in areas with higher concentrations of PM2.5 experience increased symptoms and exacerbations of chronic rhinosinusitis. The fine particles cause oxidative stress and inflammation, contributing to the pathogenesis of rhinosinusitis.

While both PM10 (particles less than 10 micrometers) and PM2.5 can affect the respiratory system, PM2.5 particles are more closely associated with rhinosinusitis due to their ability to reach deeper into the sinus cavities. These smaller particles bypass the nasal hair filtering mechanism and deposit in the mucous membranes of the sinuses, leading to greater inflammatory responses.

The World Health Organization recommends that annual mean concentrations of PM2.5 should not exceed 5 μg/m^{3}, and 24-hour mean exposures should not exceed 15 μg/m^{3} to minimize health risks. Exposure to concentrations above these thresholds has been linked to an increased incidence and severity of rhinosinusitis and other respiratory diseases.

==== Other diseases ====
Other diseases such as cystic fibrosis and granulomatosis with polyangiitis can also cause chronic sinusitis.

=== Maxillary sinus ===
Maxillary sinusitis may also develop from dental problems. These cases were calculated to be about 40% in one study and 50% in another. The cause of this situation is usually a periapical or periodontal infection of a maxillary posterior tooth, where the inflammatory exudate has eroded through the bone superiorly to drain into the maxillary sinus.

An estimated 0.5 to 2.0% of viral rhinosinusitis (VRS) cases in adults and 5 to 10% in children develop superimposed bacterial infections.

== Pathophysiology ==
Chronic rhinosinusitis is a multifactorial process hypothesized to be caused by inflammatory processes driven by dysfunction between local host and environmental interactions. It is divided into two phenotypes that depend on the presence or absence of nasal polyps. Chronic rhinosinusitis with nasal polyps and chronic rhinosinusitis without nasal polyps are thought to have two different inflammatory pathways, with the latter form driven by a Th1 response and the former driven by a Th2 response. Both pathways result in an increase in inflammatory molecules (cytokines). The Th1 response is characterized by secretion of interferon gamma. The Th2 response is characterized by secretion of interleukin-4 receptor, interleukin 5, and interleukin 13. Both forms of chronic rhinosinusitis are considered to be highly heterogeneous, each with the ability to demonstrate three inflammatory endotypes, the third being a Th17 response.

== Diagnosis ==
=== Classification ===
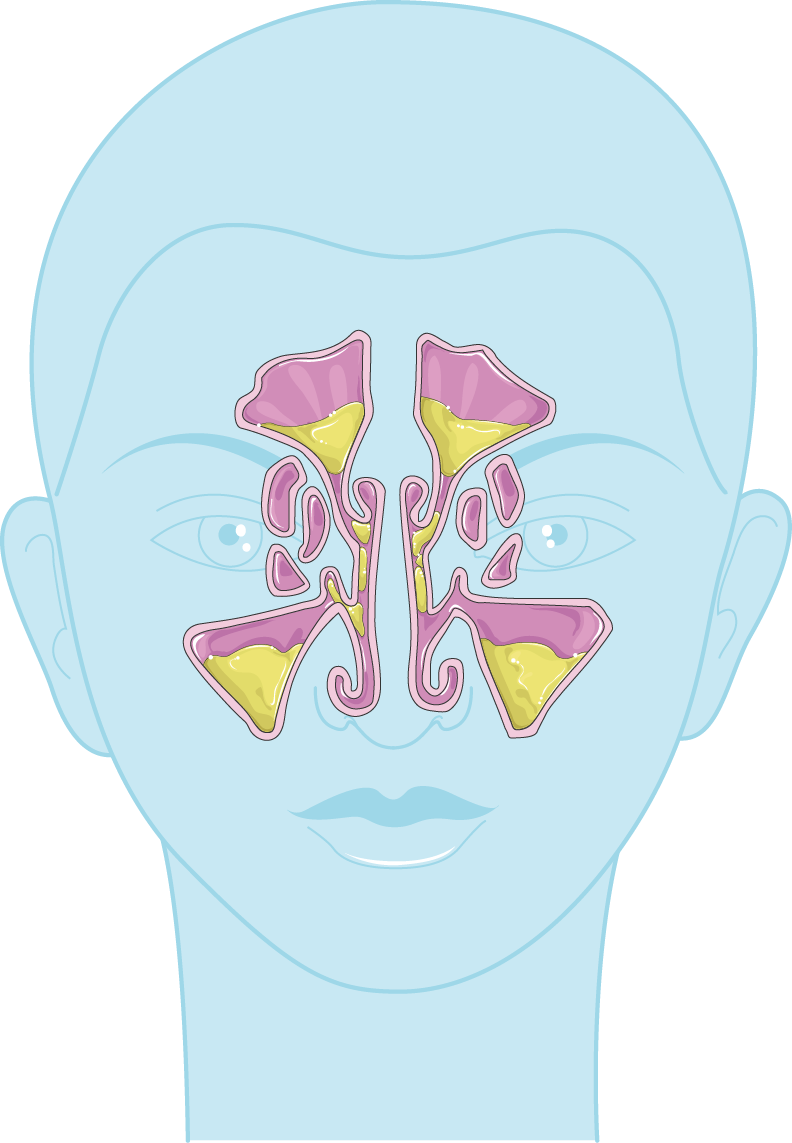
Illustration depicting sinusitis, note the fluid in the sini

Sinusitis (or rhinosinusitis) is defined as an inflammation of the mucous membrane that lines the paranasal sinuses and is classified chronologically into several categories:

- Acute sinusitis – A new infection that may last up to four weeks and can be subdivided symptomatically into severe and nonsevere. Some use definitions up to 12 weeks.
- Recurrent acute sinusitis – Four or more full episodes of acute sinusitis that occur within one year
- Subacute sinusitis – An infection that lasts between four and 12 weeks, and represents a transition between acute and chronic infection.
- Chronic sinusitis – When the signs and symptoms last for more than 12 weeks.
- Acute exacerbation of chronic sinusitis – When the signs and symptoms of chronic sinusitis exacerbate, but return to baseline after treatment.

Roughly 90% of adults have had sinusitis at some point in their lives.

=== Acute ===
Health care providers distinguish bacterial and viral sinusitis by watchful waiting. If a person has had sinusitis for fewer than 10 days without the symptoms becoming worse, then the infection is presumed to be viral. When symptoms last more than 10 days or get worse during that time, then the infection is considered bacterial sinusitis. Pain in the teeth and bad breath are also more indicative of bacterial disease.

Imaging by either X-ray, CT, or MRI is generally not recommended unless complications develop. Pain caused by sinusitis is sometimes confused for pain caused by pulpitis (toothache) of the maxillary teeth, and vice versa. Classically, the increased pain when tilting the head forwards separates sinusitis from pulpitis.

For cases of maxillary sinusitis, limited field CBCT imaging, as compared to periapical radiographs, improves the ability to detect the teeth as the sources for sinusitis. A coronal CT picture may also be useful.

=== Chronic ===
For sinusitis lasting more than 12 weeks, a CT scan is recommended. On a CT scan, acute sinus secretions have a radiodensity of 10 to 25 Hounsfield units (HU). In a more chronic state, they become more viscous, with a radiodensity of 30 to 60 HU.

Nasal endoscopy and clinical symptoms are also used to make a positive diagnosis. A tissue sample for histology and cultures can also be collected and tested. Nasal endoscopy involves inserting a flexible fiber-optic tube with a light and camera at its tip into the nose to examine the nasal passages and sinuses.

Sinus infections, if they result in tooth pain, usually present with pain involving more than one of the upper teeth, whereas a toothache usually involves a single tooth. Dental examination and appropriate radiography help rule out pain arising from a tooth.

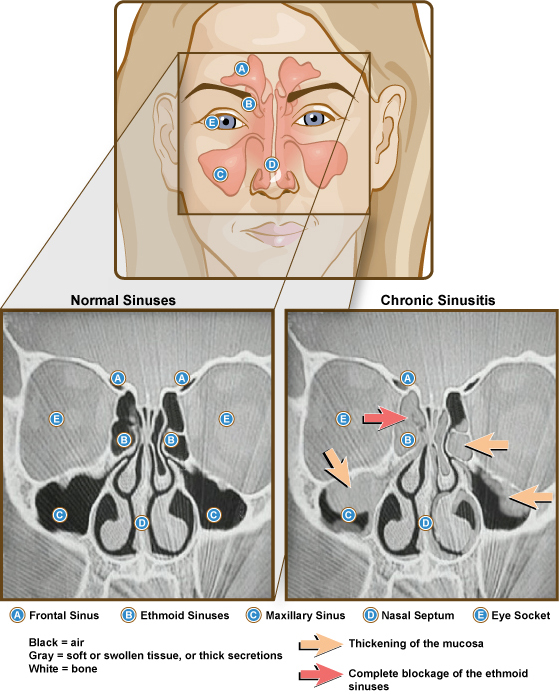
CT of chronic sinusitis

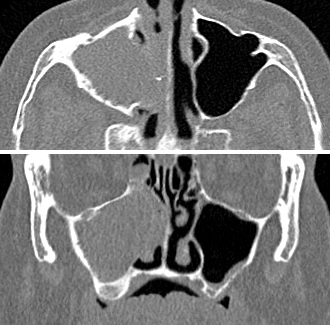
CT scan of chronic sinusitis, showing a filled right maxillary sinus with sclerotic thickened bone

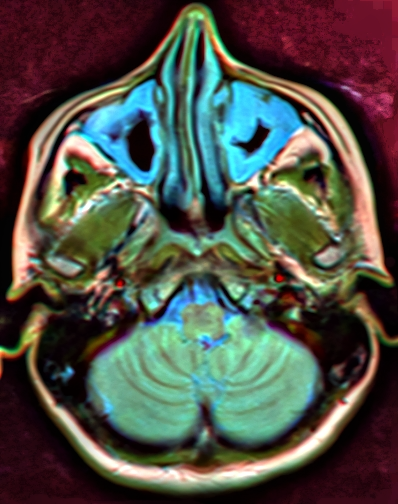
MRI image showing sinusitis. Edema and mucosal thickening appear in both maxillary sinuses.

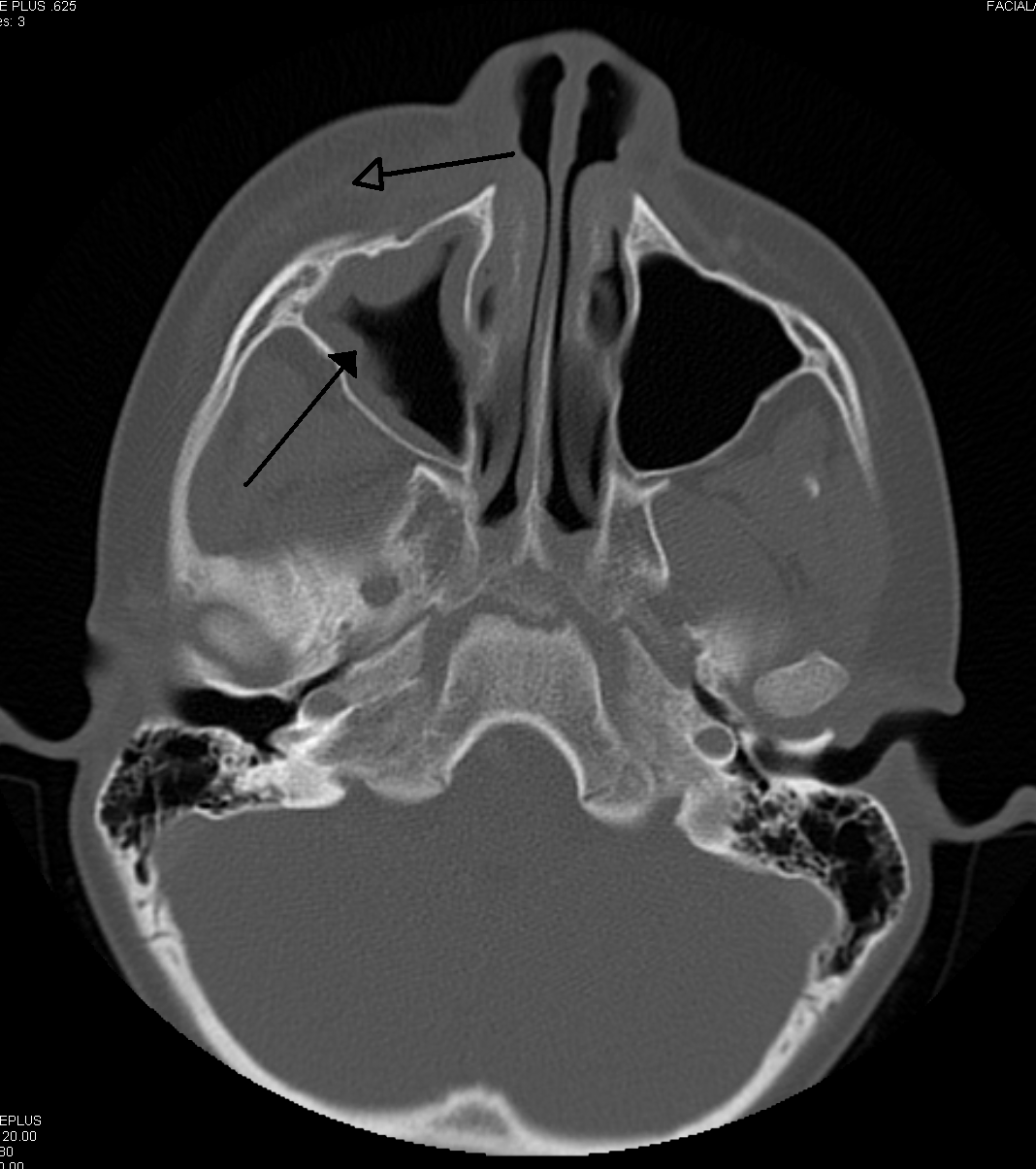
Maxillary sinusitis caused by a dental infection associated with periorbital cellulitis

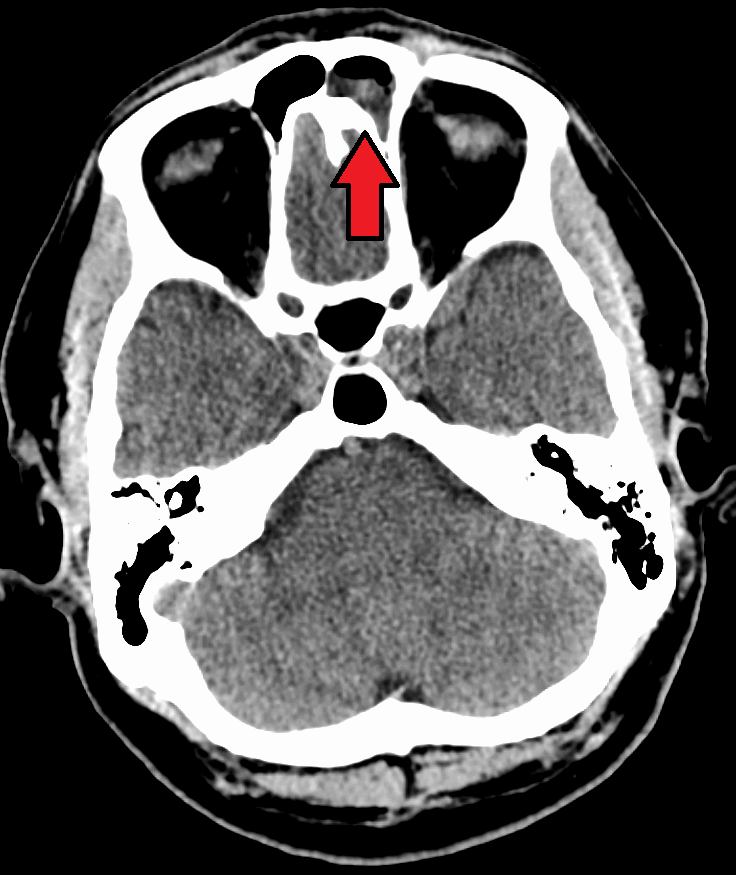
Frontal sinusitis

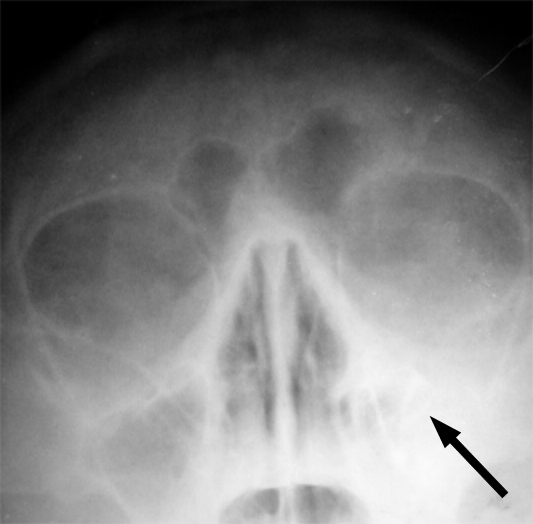
X-ray of left-sided maxillary sinusitis marked by an arrow. There is a lack of air transparency, indicating fluid in contrast to the other side.

== Treatment ==
Treatments for sinusitis
Treatment	Indication	Rationale
Time	Viral and some bacterial sinusitis	Sinusitis is usually caused by a virus, which is not affected by antibiotics.
Antibiotics	Bacterial sinusitis	Cases accompanied by extreme pain, skin infection, or that last a long time may be caused by bacteria.
Nasal irrigation	Nasal congestion	Can provide relief by helping decongest.
Drink liquids	Thick phlegm	Remaining hydrated loosens mucus.
Antihistamines	Concern with allergies	Antihistamines do not relieve typical sinusitis or cold symptoms much; this treatment is not needed in most cases.
Topical decongestant	Desire for temporary relief	Tentative evidence that it helps symptoms. Does not treat cause. Not recommended for more than three days' use.

Recommended treatments for most cases of sinusitis include rest and drinking enough water to thin the mucus. Antibiotics are not recommended for most cases.

Breathing high-temperature steam, such as from a hot shower or gargling, can relieve symptoms. There is tentative evidence for nasal irrigation in acute sinusitis, for example during upper respiratory infections. Decongestant nasal sprays containing oxymetazoline may provide relief, but these medications should not be used for more than the recommended period. Longer use may cause rebound sinusitis. It is unclear if nasal irrigation, antihistamines, or decongestants work in children with acute sinusitis. There is no clear evidence that plant extracts such as Cyclamen europaeum are effective as an intranasal wash to treat acute sinusitis; Evidence is inconclusive on whether anti-fungal treatments improve symptoms or quality of life. other plant extacts have been used in the traditional herbal treatment of gurah from Java.

=== Antibiotics ===
Most cases of sinusitis are caused by viruses and resolve without antibiotics. However, if symptoms do not resolve within 10 days, either amoxicillin or amoxicillin/clavulanate are reasonable antibiotics for first treatment with amoxicillin/clavulanate being slightly superior to amoxicillin alone but with more side effects. A 2018 Cochrane review, however, found no evidence that people with symptoms lasting seven days or more before consulting their physician are more likely to have bacterial sinusitis as one study found that about 80% of patients have symptoms lasting more than 7 days and another about 70%. Antibiotics are specifically not recommended in those with mild / moderate disease during the first week of infection due to risk of adverse effects, antibiotic resistance, and cost.

Fluoroquinolones, and a newer macrolide antibiotic such as clarithromycin or a tetracycline like doxycycline, are used in those who have severe allergies to penicillins. Because of increasing resistance to amoxicillin the 2012 guideline of the Infectious Diseases Society of America recommends amoxicillin-clavulanate as the initial treatment of choice for bacterial sinusitis. The guidelines also recommend against other commonly used antibiotics, including azithromycin, clarithromycin, and trimethoprim/sulfamethoxazole, because of growing antibiotic resistance. The FDA recommends against the use of fluoroquinolones when other options are available due to higher risks of serious side effects.

A short course (3–7 days) of antibiotics appears to be as effective as the typical longer course (10–14 days) of antibiotics for those with clinically diagnosed acute bacterial sinusitis without any other severe disease or complicating factors. The IDSA guideline suggest five to seven days of antibiotics is long enough to treat a bacterial infection without encouraging resistance. The guidelines still recommend that children receive antibiotic treatment for ten days to two weeks.

=== Corticosteroids ===
For unconfirmed acute sinusitis, nasal sprays using corticosteroids are not better than a placebo either alone or in combination with antibiotics. For cases confirmed by radiology or nasal endoscopy, treatment with intranasal corticosteroids alone or in combination with antibiotics is supported. The benefit, however, is small.

For confirmed chronic rhinosinusitis, there is limited evidence that intranasal steroids improve symptoms and insufficient evidence that one type of steroid is more effective.

There is only limited evidence to support short treatment with corticosteroids by mouth for chronic rhinosinusitis with nasal polyps. There is limited evidence to support corticosteroids by mouth in combination with antibiotics for acute sinusitis; it has only short-term effect improving the symptoms.

=== Surgery ===
For sinusitis of dental origin, treatment focuses on removing the infection and preventing reinfection by removing the microorganisms, their byproducts, and pulpal debris from the infected root canal. Systemic antibiotics are ineffective as a definitive solution. They may afford temporary relief of symptoms by improving sinus clearing. They may be appropriate for rapidly spreading infections, but debridement and disinfection of the root canal system at the same time are necessary. Treatment options include non-surgical root canal treatment, periradicular surgery, tooth replantation, or extraction of the infected tooth.

For chronic or recurring sinusitis, referral to an otolaryngologist may be indicated, and treatment options may include nasal surgery. Surgery should only be considered for those people who do not benefit with medication or have non-invasive fungal sinusitis. It is unclear how benefits of surgery compare to medical treatments in those with nasal polyps as this has been poorly studied.

Several surgical approaches can be used to access the sinuses, and these have generally shifted from external/extranasal approaches to intranasal endoscopic ones. The benefit of functional endoscopic sinus surgery (FESS) is its ability to allow for a more targeted approach to the affected sinuses, reducing tissue disruption and minimizing post-operative complications. However, if a traditional FESS with Messerklinger technique is followed the success rate will be as low as 30%, 70% of the patients tend to have recurrence within 3 years. On the other hand with use of TFSE technique along with navigation system, debriders and balloon sinuplasty or EBS can give a success rate of over 99.9%. The use of drug eluting stents such as propel mometasone furoate implant may help in recovery after surgery.

Another recently developed treatment is balloon sinuplasty. This method, similar to balloon angioplasty used to "unclog" arteries of the heart, uses balloons in an attempt to expand the openings of the sinuses in a less invasive manner. The effectiveness of the functional endoscopic balloon dilation approach compared to conventional FESS is not known.

Histopathology of sinonasal contents removed from surgery can be diagnostically valuable:

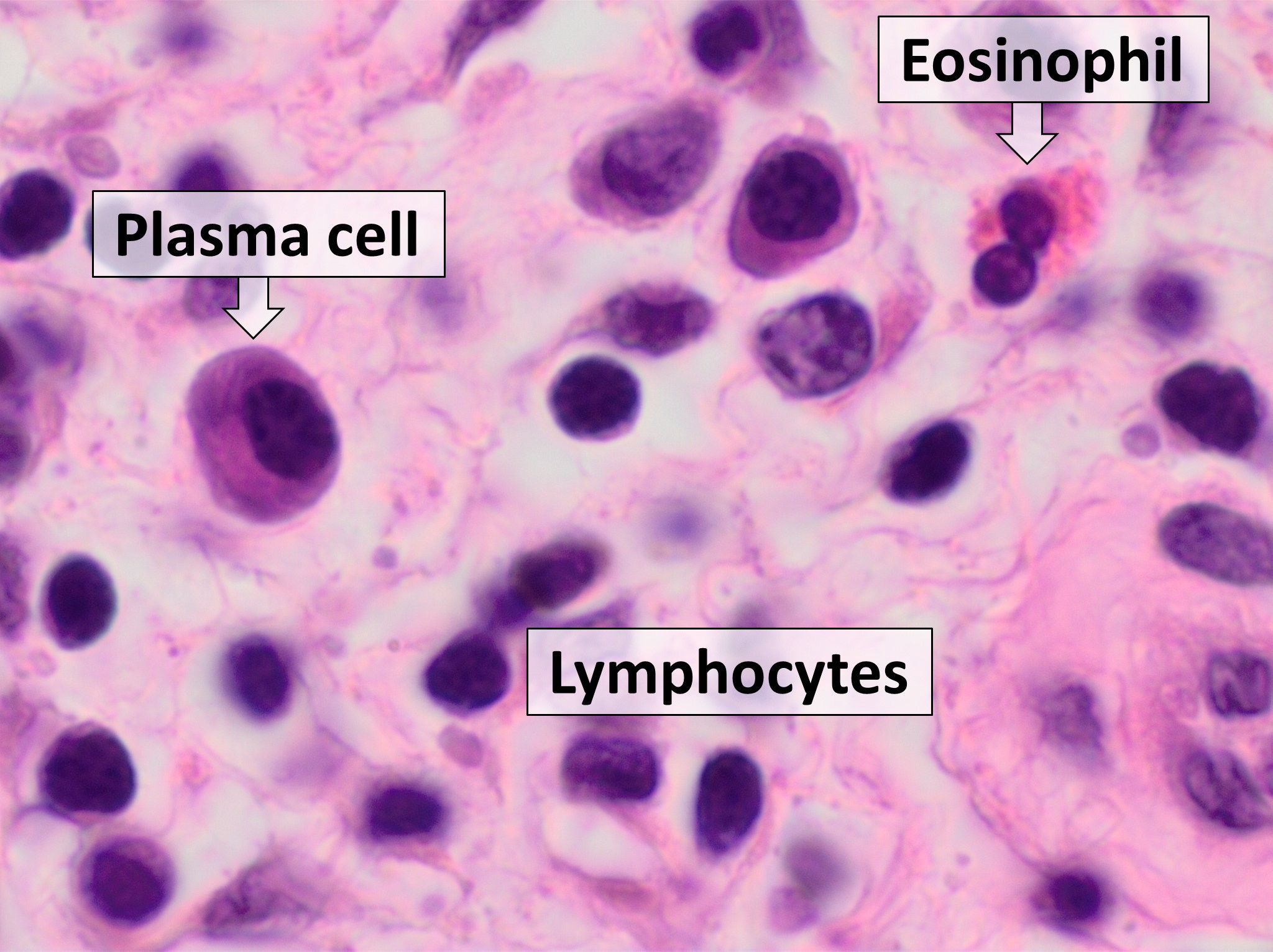
Benign chronic mixed inflammation of an inflammatory sinonasal polyp

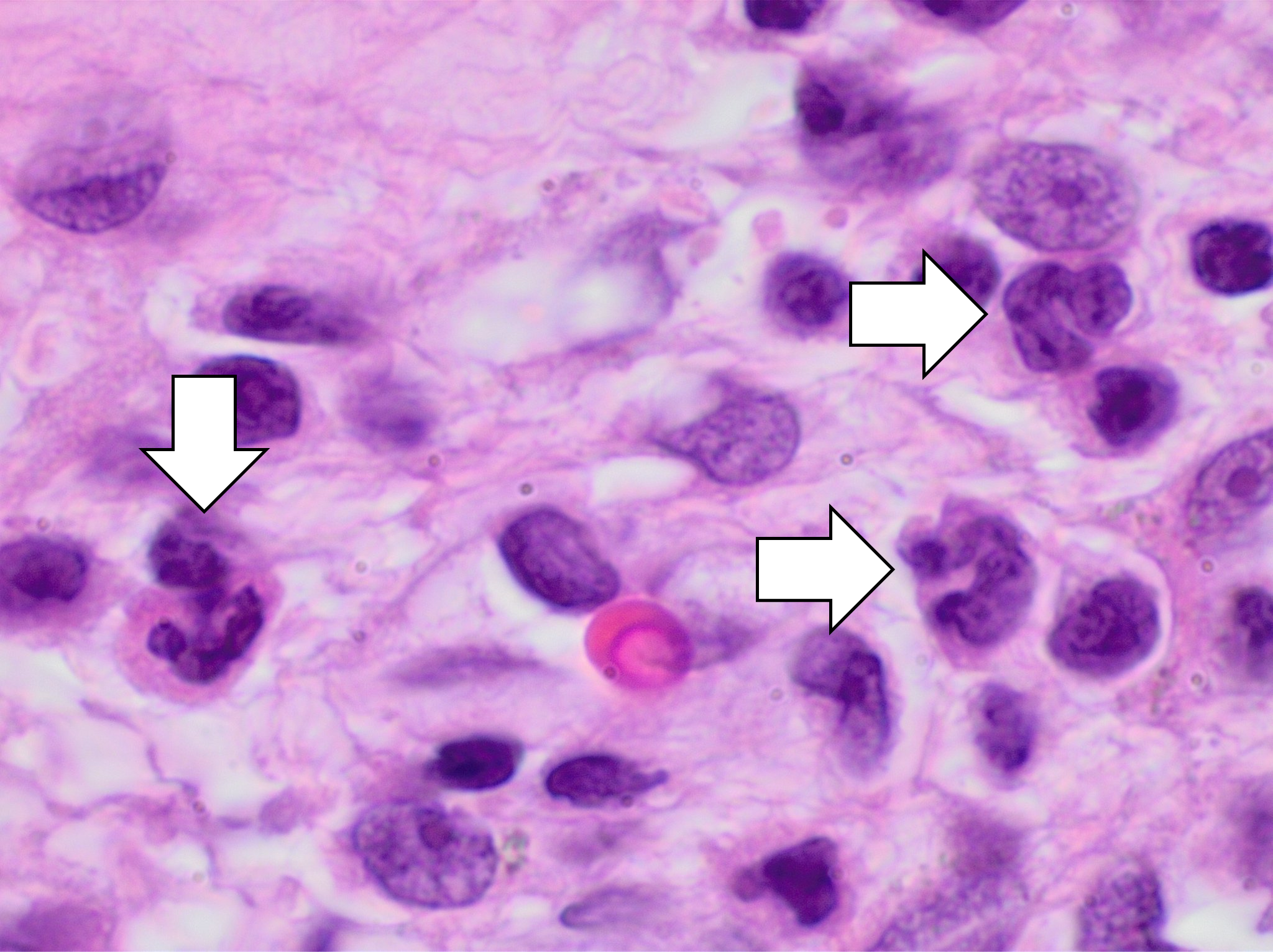
Acute inflammation characterized by neutrophils

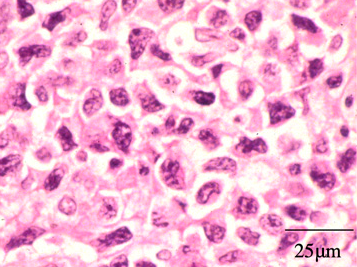
Extranodal NK/T cell lymphoma, nasal type. It may be incidentally discovered in people undergoing surgery for sinusitis.

=== Treatments directed to rhinovirus infection ===
A study has shown that patients given a spray formulation of 0.73 mg of Tremacamra (a soluble intercellular adhesion molecule 1 [ICAM-1] receptor) reduced the severity of illness.

== Prognosis ==
A 2018 review has found that without the use of antibiotics, about 46% were cured after one week and 64% after two weeks.

== Epidemiology ==
Sinusitis is a common condition, with an estimated 24 to 31 million cases occurring annually in the United States. Chronic sinusitis affects approximately 12.5% of people.

== Research ==
Based on recent theories on the role that fungi may play in the development of chronic sinusitis, antifungal treatments have been used, on a trial basis. These trials have had mixed results.

== See also ==
- Fungal sinusitis
- Odontogenic sinusitis
