= Clinoid process =

Clinoid process may refer to:

- Anterior clinoid process
- Middle clinoid process
- Posterior clinoid processes
