= Diaphragma sellae =

Roof of sella turcica

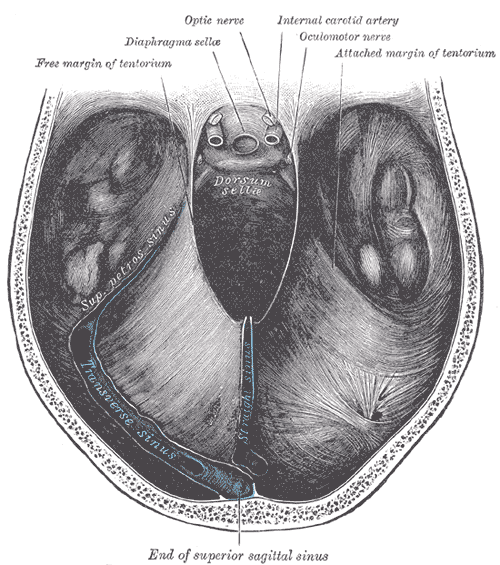
- Tentorium cerebelli seen from above. (Diaphragma sellae labeled at upper left.)

Details

Identifiers
- Latin: diaphragma sellae
- TA98: A14.1.01.107
- TA2: 5378
- FMA: 78540

The diaphragma sellae or sellar diaphragm is a small, circular sheet of dura mater forming an (incomplete) roof over the sella turcica and covering the pituitary gland lodged therein. The diaphragma sellae forms a central opening to accommodate the passage of the pituitary stalk (infundibulum) which interconnects the pituitary gland and the hypothalamus.

The diaphragma sellae is an important neurosurgical landmark.

== Anatomy ==
=== Boundaries ===
The diaphragma sellae has a posterior boundary at the dorsum sellae and an anterior boundary at the tuberculum sellae along with the two small eminences (one on either side) called the middle clinoid processes.

=== Variation ===
The opening formed by the diaphragma sellae varies greatly in size between individuals.

== Clinical significance ==
Pituitary tumours may grow to extend superiorly beyond the diaphragma sellae. Violation of the diaphragma sellae during an endoscopic endonasal transsphenoidal pituitary tumor resection will result in a cerebrospinal fluid leak.

== Additional images ==
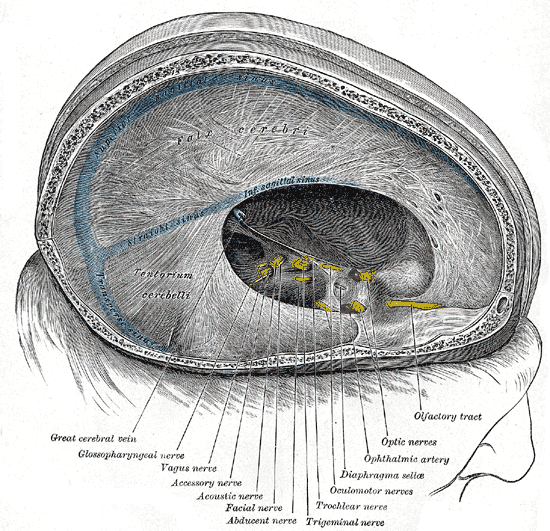
Dura mater and its processes exposed by removing part of the right half of the skull, and the brain.

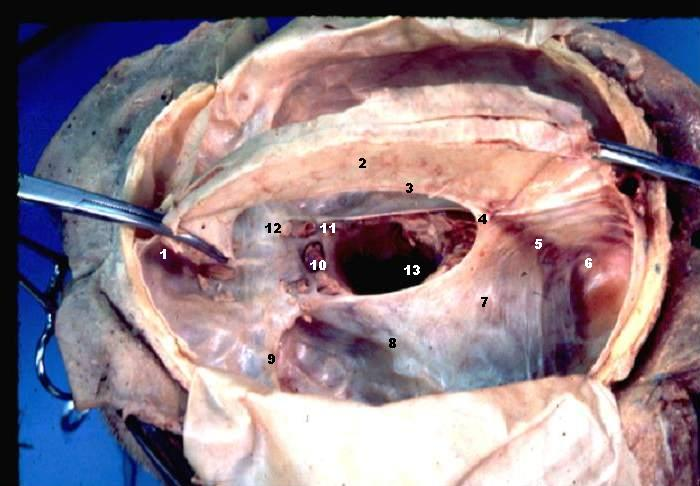
Human brain dura mater (reflections)
