= Tuberculum sellae =

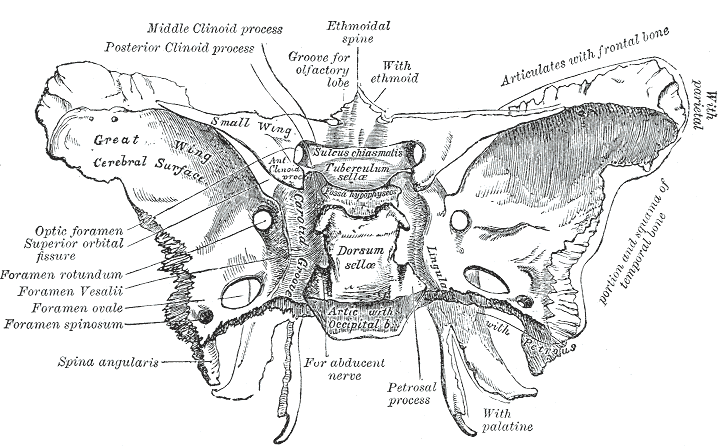
- Sphenoid bone. Upper surface. (Tuberculum sellae visible at center.)

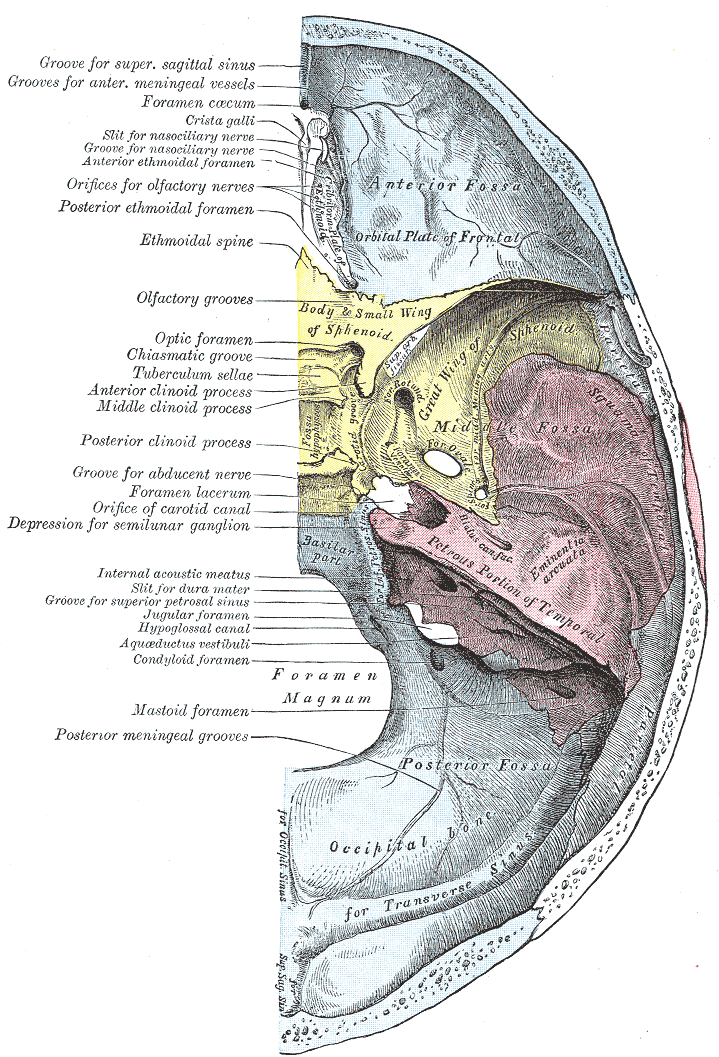
- Base of the skull. Upper surface. (Sphenoid bone visible in yellow, the tuberculum sellae is labeled at the right, fourth from the top of the yellow section.)

Identifiers
- TA98: A02.1.05.007
- TA2: 590
- FMA: 54719

The tuberculum sellae (or the tubercle of the sella turcica) is a slight median elevation upon the superior aspect of the body of sphenoid bone (that forms the floor of the middle cranial fossa) at the anterior boundary of the sella turcica (hypophyseal (pituitary) fossa) and posterior boundary of the chiasmatic groove. A middle clinoid process flanks the tuberculum sellae on either side.

== Anatomical structure ==
It represents a key anatomical landmark in the anterior fossa. It sits in the anterior aspect of the sella turcica and on the superior portion of the hypophyseal fossa. Its posterior to the prechiasmatic groove and the optic foramina. The anterior clinoid process can be found bilaterally adjacent.

The exact morphology varies from individual to individual and can be thoroughly examined using CT or MRI imaging methods.

The tuberculum sellae is related to critical neurological and vascular structures in the anterior fossa and is therefore an important feature of the skull base in neurosurgical anatomy. Its posterior to the optic chiasm and the optic nerves, inferior to the third ventricle, and superior to the pituitary gland and its dural attachments. The cavernous sinus and the carotid syphon can be found bilateral to the tuberculum sellae.

== Clinical significance ==
Variations in the morphology of the tubercle of the sella turcica, or the sella proper, can be a sign of neurological or endocrine alterations. A sella turcica with a more prominent hypophyseal fossa can be an indication of empty sella syndrome or hypophyseal lesions. Examination of the parsellar region via imaging studies is a central aspect of diagnosing hypophyseal pathologies.

Transsphenoidal endoscopic approaches to the parasellar region involve an insightful understanding of the anatomy of tuberculum sellae, as it represents a point of entry into the anterior skull base and its structure must be understood in order to access the parasellar region without compromising neurological or vascular structures.

== Additional images ==
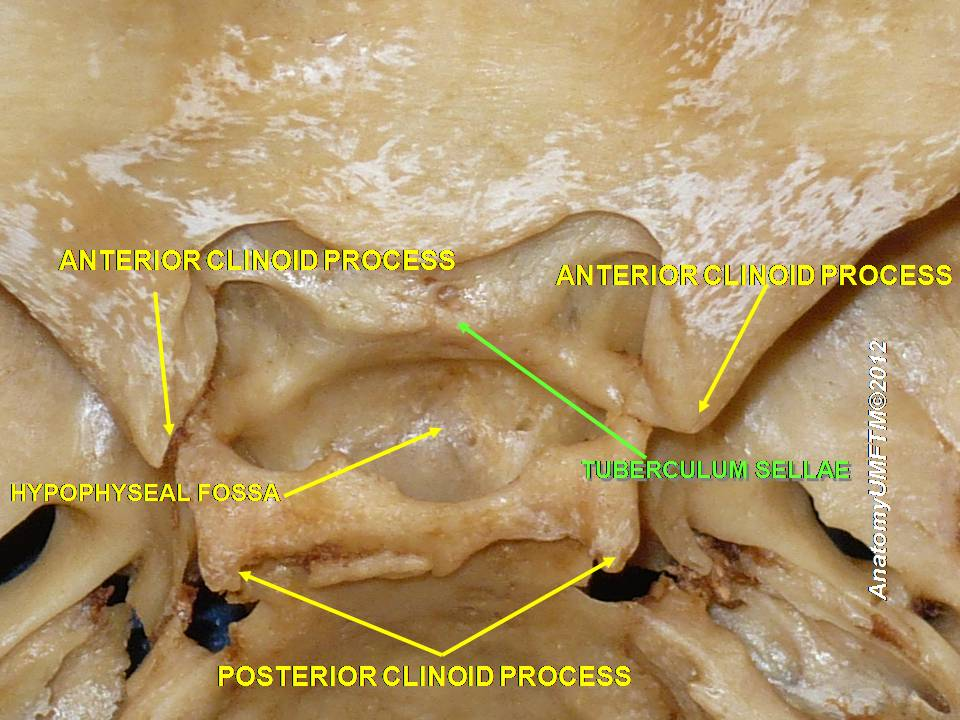
Tuberculum sellae
