= Oskar Hirsch =

Austrian otolaryngologist (1877-1965)

Oskar Hirsch (November 14, 1877 – April 20, 1965) was an Austrian otolaryngologist. He was a pioneer of the transsphenoidal technique for pituitary gland surgery.

== Biography ==
Hirsch was born in Přerov, Moravia, now part of the Czech Republic, in 1877. He attended a Gymnasium school and moved to Vienna in 1897 to study medicine, receiving his medical degree in 1902. He trained at the Vienna General Hospital which included an apprenticeship in otorhinolaryngology. He worked on the hospital staff and studied the sphenoid sinuses of autopsy specimens, which formed the basis of seminars he provided on sphenoid and sellar anatomy.

Building upon techniques developed by his mentor, Markus Hajek, he presented his own approach for pituitary gland surgery via a transsphenoidal approach (through the nose) at a Viennese medical meeting in March 1909. His presentation was met by criticism, including by Hajek, who questioned the technical feasibility of such surgery. Hirsch demonstrated his procedure to the American surgeon Harvey Cushing in Vienna in 1911; Cushing subsequently adapted Hirsch's technique, which he used to treat over 200 patients. Case series reported by Hirsch in the following decades up to 1937 reported mortality rates of 12.4% in 113 patients and 5.4% in a later 277 patients.

Hirsch also developed a new technique for eye surgery in patients with exophthalmos due to Graves' disease; he pioneered an approach through the maxillary sinus which he described in 1930. He fled the Nazi presence in Austria for the United States in 1938 and settled in Boston, chosen largely because of his relationship with Cushing, who worked there. He operated in Boston until his retirement in 1963, and died on 20 April 1965.
