= Skull base surgery =

Surgical procedure for treating lesions

Video of an endoscopic skull base surgery in action under an endoscope

Skull base surgery is a surgical procedure that treats lesions at the skull base. It is used for tumours, congenital defects at the skull, cerebrospinal (CSF) fluid leaks and blood vessel lesions while protecting critical neurovascular structures. This multidisciplinary surgery integrates both neurosurgery and otorhinolaryngology, employing two major approaches: open transcranial and endoscopic endonasal approach (EEA). EEA is often preferred, yet open transcranial techniques are still being employed to treat complex or laterally extended lesions. This field has evolved from early open procedures in the late 19th century to modern endoscopic techniques, leading to widened indications and improvements in surgical outcomes. The field continues to focus on the advancement of surgical visualisation and reconstruction techniques, complication management, and addressing global challenges in its accessibility.

== Uses ==
Skull base surgery focuses on treating lesions (damaged tissues) in the intricate anatomical region of the skull base. Surgeons select between the minimally invasive endoscopic endonasal approach (EEA) and the traditional open transcranial approach.

=== Neoplastic lesions (tumours) ===
A major indication for skull base surgery is tumours. They can be classified by their benign (non-cancerous) or malignant (cancerous) nature and their anatomical location (at the anterior, middle, or posterior cranial fossa).

For craniopharyngiomas, the tumour is removed to achieve a higher gross total resection (GTR) rate, improvements in visuals, lower recurrence and lower permanent diabetes insipidus rates when EEA is used compared with the transcranial approach. For chordomas, both approaches have similar survival outcomes after tumour removal, but EEA reduces worsening cranial nerve function better. For pituitary adenomas, both approaches have similar GTR rates, with EEA associated with better recovery of vision.

EEA is generally favoured for tumours due to its advantages. However, surgeons still need to retain open approaches in their toolkit as it is reserved for skull base tumours that have invaded structures like orbit and intradural compartments (i.e. sphenoorbital meningioma) or further disease developments that result in the inability of a second endoscopic approach. Other cases of favouring an open approach over EEA include considerations like the tumour extending over the orbital roof or prioritising olfaction (smelling) preservation.

=== Congenital lesions ===
Congenital (present from birth) skull base lesions (e.g. encephaloceles, fibrous dysplasia or other developmental defects) are rarer indications. Intervention is required when they cause complications such as mass effect (a growing mass that pushes its surrounding tissue), cerebrospinal fluid leakage or recurrent infections leading to meningitis or forming brain abscess. For anterior congenital cephaloceles (a subtype of encephaloces), EEA removes the protruding tissue with lower complications and mortality post-operation than open surgery.

=== Cerebrospinal fluid (CSF) leaks ===
CSF leaks are classified as traumatic (resulting from accidental or iatrogenic injury: healer-caused harm) or non-traumatic (birth defects, infections, inflammation). For CSF rhinorrhea (CSF leakage into the nose), EEA seals the leak site and is established as the gold-standard treatment, with meta-analyses reporting the pooled primary repair success rate and overall success after surgery redo being 93.7% and 99.7% respectively.

=== Vascular abnormalities ===
In rare selected cases, EEA provides access to treat vascular abnormalities such as paraclinoid aneurysms (bulges in the wall of the internal carotid artery) or cavernous malformation that lie next to the brainstem. However, EEA currently plays a limited role and is continuously evolving, although it may already offer improvements in visualisation and vascular control.

== Contraindications ==
Absolute contraindications of endoscopic endonasal surgery (EEA), where the approach should never be used, include the presence of active bacterial sinusitis, as no surgery should be performed until the infection is cleared. If the tumour has extended laterally beyond boundaries set by critical neurovascular structures, EEA should not be used as the only approach, as a microscopic, open transcranial or combined approach may be required instead. Other absolute contraindications include total maxillectomy (removal of upper jawbone), orbital exenteration (removal of eye socket), resection of fascial skin or anterior wall of frontal sinus and aggressive tumour wrapping around the internal carotid artery.

Relative contraindications to EEA, which make the procedure risky but not completely forbidden, include medical comorbidities (co-occurrence of chronic diseases), such as severe sleep apnea or granulomatosis with polyangiitis. Others include decreased sinus pneumatization (presence of air spaces between bones), narrow piriform aperture(significant for patients less than 2 years old). Furthermore, the surgeon's insufficient experience, as this surgery requires extensive familiarity with vital neurovascular structures, and lack of advanced hospital equipment, are considered relative contraindications.

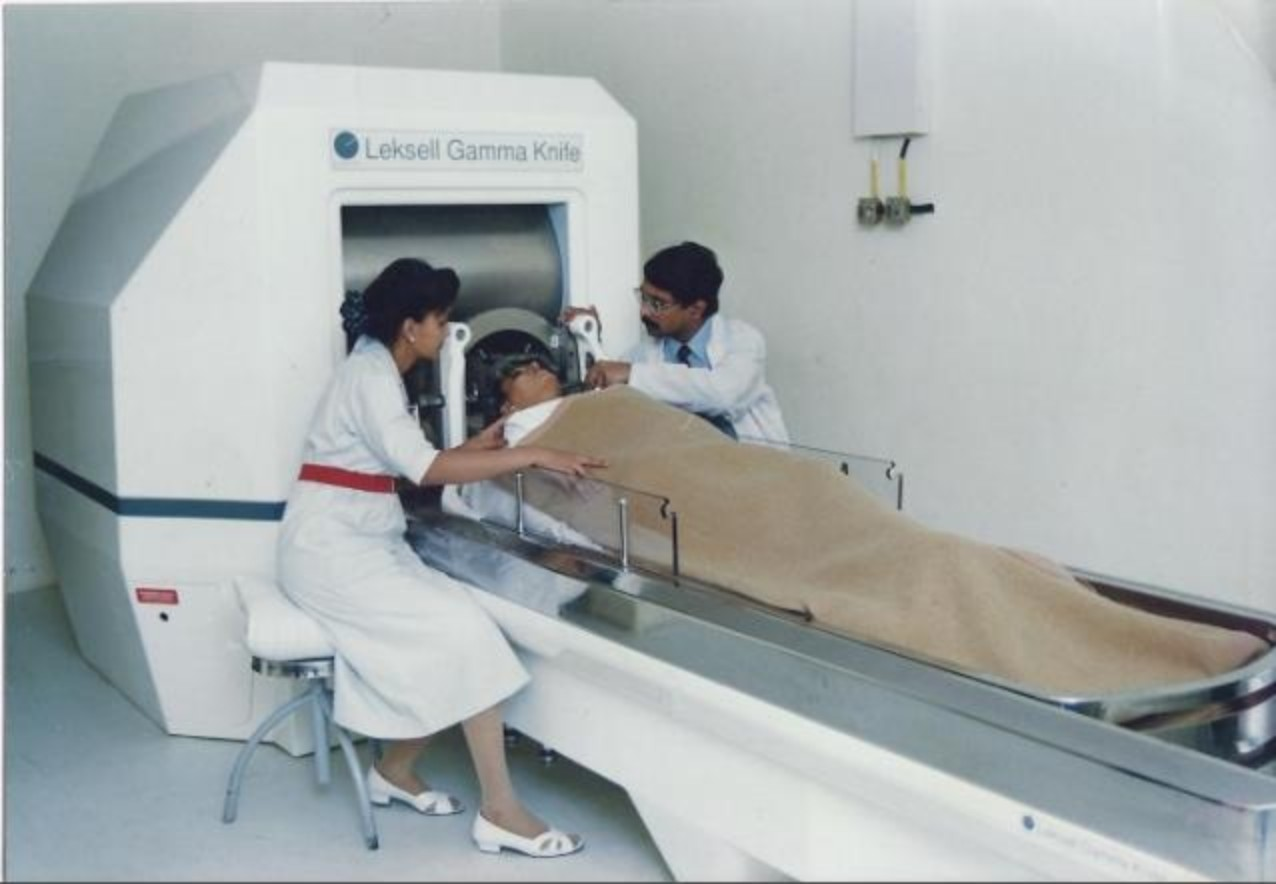
Stereotactic radiosurgery as a non-surgical alternative

=== Preference for non-surgical alternatives ===
Stereotactic radiosurgery can be applied to benign tumours such as meningioma that are asymptomatic or mildly symptomatic, and is even used as a standard treatment for those that are especially small or incidentally discovered. This alternative is suitable for elderly patients with serious comorbidities and poor health status, with the consequences of surgical risks outweighing tumour control.

== Risk and complications ==
=== Cerebrospinal fluid leak and meningitis ===
Cerebrospinal fluid (CSF) leak is the most common risk of skull base surgery. The incidence rate is around 2.5-3%. The risk is significantly higher when tumours develop in the functional areas of the brain. CSF leakage can cause severe morbidity, including meningitis. Treatment includes a lumbar drain, ventriculoperitoneal shunt (a medical device to drain CSF) and surgical repair. It was found that the introduction of injectable hydroxyapatite and nasoseptal flap (a patient's own tissue from the nose) during the surgery would be an effective way to minimise CSF leakage, when compared with using nasoseptal flap alone.

=== Cranial nerve deficits ===
Two commonly affected cranial nerves are the oculomotor nerve and the abducens nerve. The oculomotor nerve is particularly susceptible to damage in the surgery of medial sphenoid wing meningioma and spheno-orbital meningiomas (specific brain tumours). On the other hand, the abducens nerve is often subject to risk of palsy in transclival approaches (procedure to access the clivus and posterior cranial fossa) due to its unique location. Damage to the nerve leads to impaired lateral rectus muscle function and double vision (diplopia).Intraoperative neurophysiological monitoring helps reduce the risk of cranial nerve deficits by immediate identification. The endoscopic approach, when compared to open transcranial resection, can significantly reduce potential damage to the nerves.

=== Vascular injury ===
The internal carotid artery (ICA) suffers from a specifically high risk of injury, and its damage is potentially fatal. Apart from direct damage, ICA injury may result from infection or pseudoaneurysm, with sentinel bleeding (a small amount of blood leaks from a weakened blood vessel) happening as an alert. In some cases, ICA injury may be followed by an embolic stroke. ICA injury is a universal risk for both open approaches (much higher risk) and endoscopic approaches. Unlike open approaches, endoscopic approaches would have a higher risk of cerebral infarction due to blood vessel damage or vasospasm. Risk factors of ICA injury include prior surgery and certain types of adenoma (growth hormone-secreting pituitary adenomas).

== Techniques ==
Skull base surgery is performed via two routes: the open transcranial and endoscopic endonasal approach (EEA).

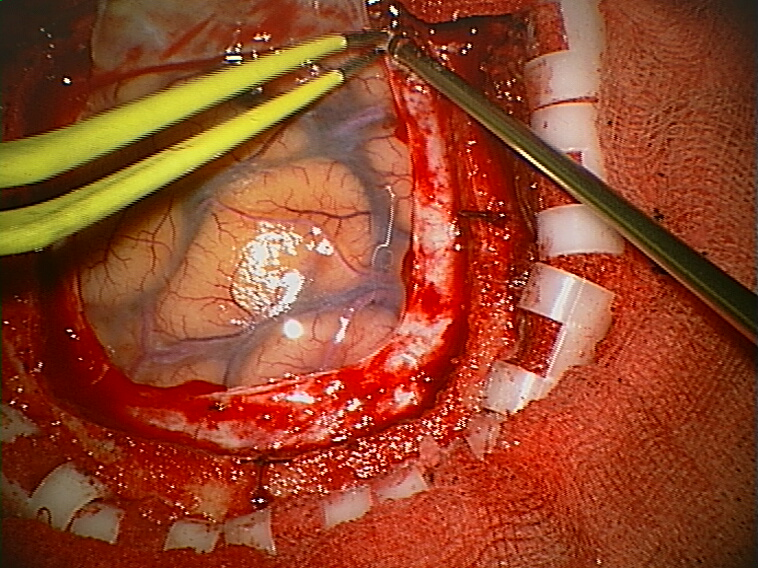
Example of a craniotomy removing an arachnoid cyst using the open transcranial approach

The open transcranial approach requires the creation of a bone flap by performing craniotomy with high-speed drills and burr holes, followed by microsurgery with brain retraction and nerve manipulation to expose lesions.

EEA uses corridors in the nasal cavity with the two-surgeon, four-hand technique (one surgeon holding surgical instruments, while the other controls the endoscope) and removes bone to create a wider surgical corridor for visualisation. With this, EEA can avoid brain retraction by directly reaching skull base lesions, accessing both the anterior and middle cranial fossa.

Multilayered skull-base reconstruction is required to prevent cerebrospinal fluid leakage, utilising nasoseptal flaps along with techniques such as bilayer fascia lata graft (specialised technique to fix skull base holes) and gasket seal closure (tight seal to prevent cerebrospinal fluid leakage).

== Recovery and rehabilitation ==
=== Immediate postoperative care ===
Common postoperative care includes nasal packing (procedure to stop nose bleeding), bed rest and lumbar drain (in case of serious cerebrospinal fluid leakage). On top of that, patients usually receive hospital monitoring for infection and stroke for days to weeks.

=== Short-term recovery ===
Patients after skull base surgery often suffer from significant morbidity, including pain, nasal secretions, hyposmia (loss of smell) and blocked nose. Some may also develop endocrine issues, severely worsening quality of life. Symptoms will improve after a few months as nasal crusting clears up. In this stage, patients are usually subject to weekly clinical follow-up after being discharged, including videoendoscopic debridement (wound treatment), nasal irrigation, antibiotic treatment, and lumbar drain.

=== Long-term rehabilitation ===
Generally, patients' condition returns to normal by 12 months. Individuals may receive monthly follow-up during this period, after which most people would feel normal.

== History ==
=== Early open approaches (1900-1970s) ===
Francesco Durante performed the first recorded skull base surgery in 1884. It was a removal of an olfactory groove meningioma (a kind of brain tumour) using the transbasal approach (removing the skull bones right above the sinuses). In 1907, Hermann Schloffer completed a pituitary adenoma (pituitary tumour) resection by transsphenoidal surgery via a lateral rhinotomy (cutting along the side of the nose). Following Schloffer, Oskar Hirsch introduced the endonasal transseptal transsphenoidal approach in 1910, aimed at avoiding lateral rhinotomy. In the same year, Albert E. Halstead suggested the sublabial, gingival incision (cutting from the inner side of the lips) to reach the sphenoid sinus. Besides the surgical aspect, technological advancements have also enhanced transsphenoidal surgery. Improved illumination by Norman Dott, fluoroscopy by Gerard Guiot, and the introduction of the operating microscope together improved the quality of transsphenoidal surgeries.

=== Multidisciplinary skull base era (1980s–1990s) ===
==== Operating microscope ====
The first use of an operating microscope in surgery was by Carl Nylen in 1921. Counterbalanced and floating stands for the operating microscope were introduced by M. Gazi Yaşargil in 1969. This facilitated the systematic use of operating microscopes in surgical processes.

==== High-speed drills ====
The drill was first used by Arthur Mathewson in 1876 to remove external auditory canal hyperostosis (excess bone growth). A milestone was in 1969, when M.Gazi Yaşargil performed extradural (outside the tough membrane covering the brain) drilling of the sphenoid wing during the standard pterional craniotomy (removing the bones over the pterion).

==== Popularising extradural skull base neurosurgery (SBNS) approaches ====
Extradural SBNS approaches were rarely conducted in neurosurgery before the 1990s. These techniques have been popularised since William House's "translabyrinthine approach". A classic case of collaboration was an operation carried out by neurosurgeon Madjid Samii and otolaryngologist Wolfgang Draf. They developed techniques to preserve the facial nerve during vestibular schwannoma (a tumour on the nerve from the inner ear to the brain) surgery.

=== Endoscopic endonasal revolution (1990s–present) ===
The first endoscopic skull base surgery was carried out by Roger Jankowski, an otolaryngologist, in the 1990s. In 2006, Gustavo Haddad introduced a surgical technique that utilised a nasoseptal flap, a patient's own tissue from the nose, to limit cerebrospinal fluid (CSF) leaks. On top of that, a technique called Gasket Seal Closure is introduced to reduce CSF leak risk further. Subsequently, it gives rise to the multilayered closure algorithm, a stepwise protocol for skull base reconstruction. Currently, techniques including the bilayer button (using connective tissue to patch skull base holes), in-situ bone flap (reusing the same skull bone removed for patching holes), and 3 F (fat, flap and flash) technique are commonly used.

== Society and culture ==
Cultural connotations of skull base surgery are shaped by public perceptions, as they believe brain surgery to be high risk and invasive, linking to patient-reported fear and frustration, loss of self-identity, and social isolation due to physical appearance changes. In low- and middle-income countries, this surgery imposes significant financial burdens as well as limited neurosurgical care. In Eastern African countries, neurosurgical treatments take up 132% of their annual income while neurosurgeon density is extremely low, with 1 out of 687740 people. Awareness remains limited globally, with Ethiopians and Nigerians believing brain diseases to be outworldly, preferring traditional medicine or spiritual healing.
