= Middle clinoid process =

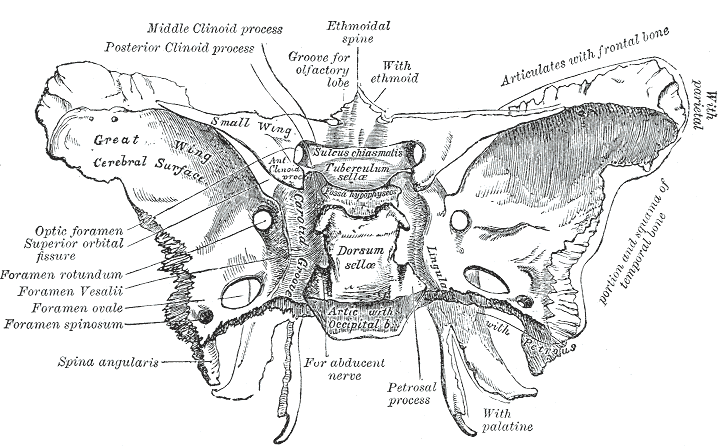
- Sphenoid bone. Upper surface. (Middle clinoid process labeled at upper left.)

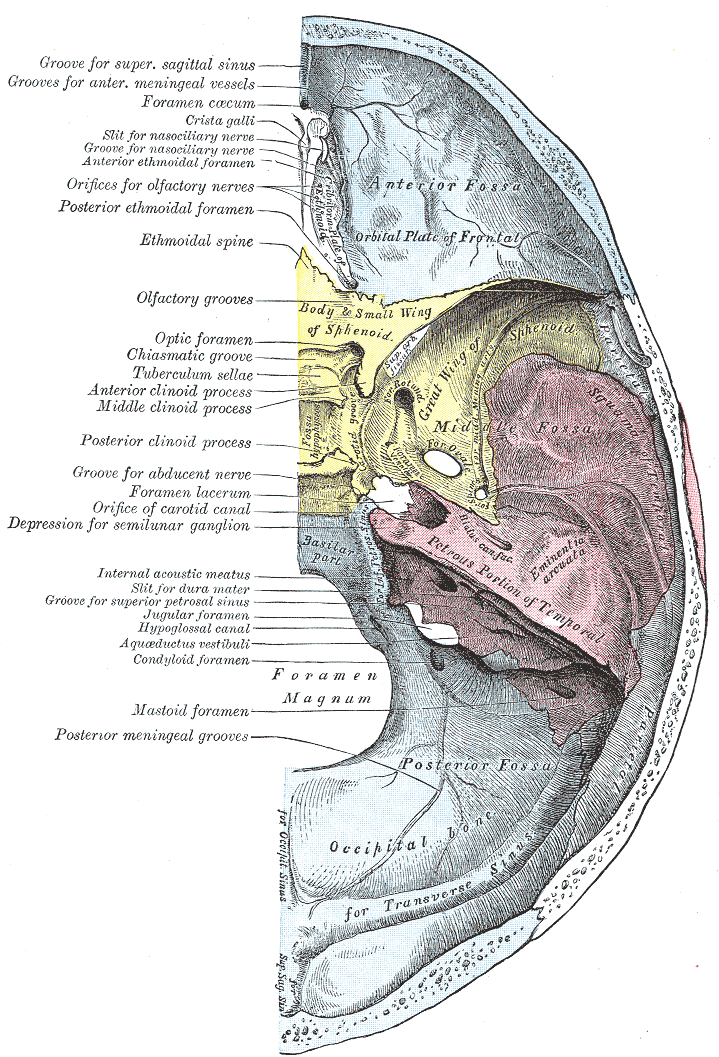
- Floor of the skull. (Sphenoid is in yellow. Middle clinoid process labeled at center left.)

Details

Identifiers
- Latin: processus clinoideus medius
- TA98: A02.1.05.008
- TA2: 591
- FMA: 54700

The middle clinoid process is a small, bilaterally paired elevation on either side of the tuberculum sellae, at the anterior boundary of the sella turcica. A (larger) anterior clinoid process is situated lateral to each middle clinoid process. The diaphragma sellae (i.e. the dura forming the roof of the cavernous sinus) and the dura of the floor of the hypophyseal fossa (sella turcica) attach onto the middle clinoid processes.

On each side of the body, the internal carotid artery passes between the anterior and middle clinoid processes.

== Etymology ==
Clinoid likely comes from the Greek root klinein or the Latin clinare, both meaning "sloped" as in "inclined."
