= Tizi Ouzou (disambiguation) =

Tizi Ouzou is one of the largest cities of Algeria.

Tizi Ouzou may also refer to:

- Tizi Ouzou Province, Province in Algeria
- University of Tizi Ouzou
