= Superior hypophysial artery =

Details
- Source: Ophthalmic portion of internal carotid artery
- Supplies: Pituitary gland

Identifiers
- Latin: arteria hypophysialis superior, arteria hypophyseos superior
- TA98: A12.2.06.017
- TA2: 4468
- FMA: 49849

The superior hypophyseal artery is an artery supplying the pars tuberalis, the infundibulum of the pituitary gland, and the median eminence. It is a branch of the ophthalmic part of the internal carotid artery.
