= PSIS =

PSIS may refer to:

- Posterior superior iliac spine, part of the human hip bone
- Pituitary stalk interruption syndrome, a birth disorder affecting the pituitary gland
- PSIS Semarang, an Indonesian football team
- PSIS Co-operative, a financial services co-operative based in New Zealand
