= Petrolingual ligament =

Ligament of the head

The petrolingual ligament lies at the posteroinferior aspect of the lateral wall of the cavernous sinus and marks the point at which the internal carotid artery enters the cavernous sinus.

Anatomically, the petrolingual ligament demarcates two of the segments of the internal carotid artery:

- The petrolingual ligament marks the end of the petrous section of the internal carotid artery.
- The cavernous section of the internal carotid artery begins at the superior aspect of the petrolingual ligament.

For surgeons and radiologists, it is important to be oriented to the location of this ligament in cases of possible dissection of the internal carotid artery, as it helps determine whether the dissection has occurred inside or outside the cavernous sinus.
