= Inferior hypophysial artery =

Artery supplying the posterior pituitary

Inferior hypophyseal artery

Details
- Source: Cavernous carotid artery from internal carotid artery
- Supplies: Posterior pituitary of pituitary gland

Identifiers
- Latin: arteria hypophysialis inferior
- TA98: A12.2.06.012
- TA2: 4467
- FMA: 49846

The inferior hypophysial artery is an artery in the head. It is a branch of the cavernous carotid artery, itself from the internal carotid artery. It supplies the posterior pituitary of the pituitary gland.

== Structure ==
The inferior hypophysial artery is a branch of the cavernous carotid artery, itself from the internal carotid artery. Alternatively, it may arise from the meningohypophyseal artery. It passes across the middle of the cavernous sinus. It reaches the lateral surface of the posterior pituitary. It merges with the other inferior hypophysial artery.

The inferior hypophysial artery may give off the medial clival artery.

== Function ==
The inferior hypophysial artery supplies the pituitary gland, specifically the posterior pituitary (neurohypophysis). It is important for distributing vasopressin into the bloodstream.

== History ==
The inferior hypophysial artery was first identified in 1860 by Hubert von Luschka.
