= Meningohypophyseal artery =

Inconstant branch of the cavernous segment of the internal carotid artery

The meningohypophyseal artery, or meningohypophyseal trunk, is an inconstant branch of the cavernous segment of the internal carotid artery. Classically, the meningohypophyseal artery has three named branches:

1. Dorsal meningeal artery
2. Inferior hypophyseal artery
3. Tentorial artery (artery of Bernasconi and Cassinari, also known as the "Italian" artery)
