= Dorsum sellae =

Part of the skull

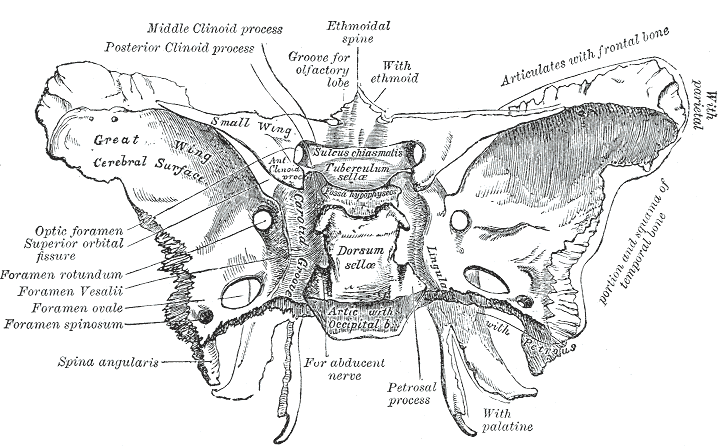
- Sphenoid bone. Upper surface. (Dorsum sellae is labeled in the white portion in the center.)

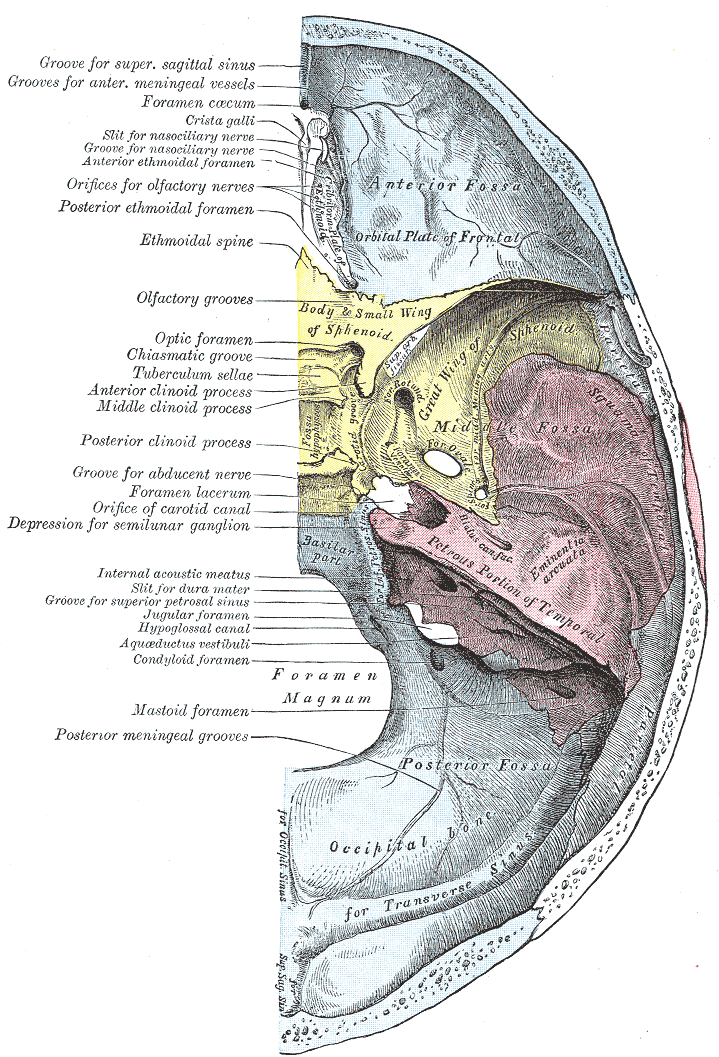
- Base of the skull. Upper surface. (Dorsum sellae is not labelled, but sphenoid bone is in yellow, and Dorsum sellae would horizontally be at the exact centre, and vertically at the level of the posterior clinoid process.)

Details

Identifiers
- Latin: dorsum sellae, dorsum sella turcica
- TA98: A02.1.05.010
- TA2: 594
- FMA: 54718

The dorsum sellae is part of the sphenoid bone in the skull. Together with the basilar part of the occipital bone it forms the clivus.

In the sphenoid bone, the anterior boundary of the sella turcica is completed by two small eminences, one on either side, called the middle clinoid processes, while the posterior boundary is formed by a square-shaped plate of bone, the dorsum sellae, ending at its superior angles in two tubercles, the posterior clinoid processes, the size and form of which vary considerably in different individuals.

== Additional images ==
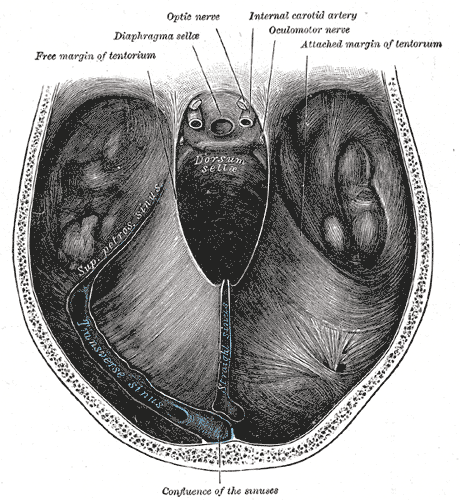
Tentorium cerebelli from above

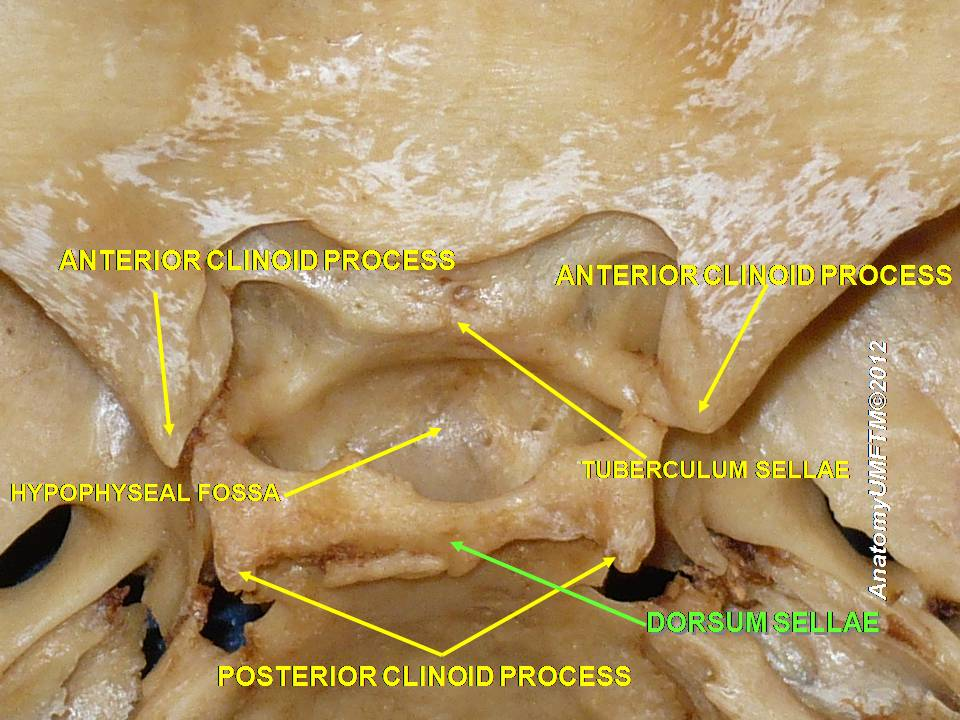
Dorsum sellae
