= Ostia =

Ostia may refer to:

== Places ==
- Ostia (Rome), a municipio (also called Ostia Lido or Lido di Ostia) of Rome
- Ostia Antica, a township and port of ancient Rome
- Ostia Antica (district), a district of the commune of Rome

== Arts and entertainment ==
- Ostia (film), a 1970 Italian comedy film directed by Sergio Citti
- A song by Sepultura from the 2006 album Dante XXI
- A song by Coil from the 1986 album Horse Rotorvator
- A fictional region of the country Lycia in Fire Emblem
- A fictional city in the manga series Negima; see List of Negima! Magister Negi Magi characters

== Other ==
- The plural form of ostium, an anatomical term meaning a small opening
  - The plural form of ostium (sponges), a pore present in sponges
