= Faiza Lalam =

Algerian neurosurgeon

- فايزة لعلام
- Known for: First woman neurosurgeon in Africa
- Medical career
- Institutions: University Hospital, University of Tizi Ouzou
- Sub-specialties: Neurosurgery

Faiza Lalam (Arabic: فايزة لعلام) is a medical doctor from Algeria, who is credited as the first woman neurosurgeon in Africa, spearheading the work of women in the specialism on the continent. She was described in 2020 as the "'Dean' of women neurosurgeons in Africa and the Middle East" by the World Federation of Neurosurgical Societies.

Lalam began her training in 1977 and was certified as a neurosurgeon in 1982, working in the surgical department of the University Hospital in Tizi Ouzou. In 2011 she was appointed Professor and Head of the Department there. In 2014 she was one of the first neurosurgeons in Algeria to carry out endoscopic endonasal surgery.
