= Sellar region =

Sellar region is a small area in the central nervous system (CNS) that includes the sella turcica, cavernous sinus, suprasellar cistern, and pituitary gland. The pituitary gland is located in the sella turcica, a saddle-shaped indentation in the sphenoid bone at the base of the skull. The most common tumours in the sellar region are anterior pituitary adenomas, followed by tumors from the posterior pituitary. Magnetic resonance imaging is the preferred imaging method for detecting sellar conditions. The sellar region is surrounded by important structures: the brainstem and basilar artery behind the optic nerves, optic chiasm, and circle of Willis above, and the carotid arteries and cavernous sinus on the sides. Surgery is often the primary treatment for sellar lesions, allowing for tumor removal and pathological analysis. A sellar mass can cause hormone imbalances, vision problems, or headaches. Sometimes, it is found by chance during a brain scan for another reason.

== See also ==
- Hypopituitarism
- Empty sella syndrome
