= Pituitary stalk interruption syndrome =

Congenital disorder in which the pituitary stalk and pituitary are hypoplastic

Pituitary stalk interruption syndrome (PSIS)
- Other names: Ectopic neurohypophysis
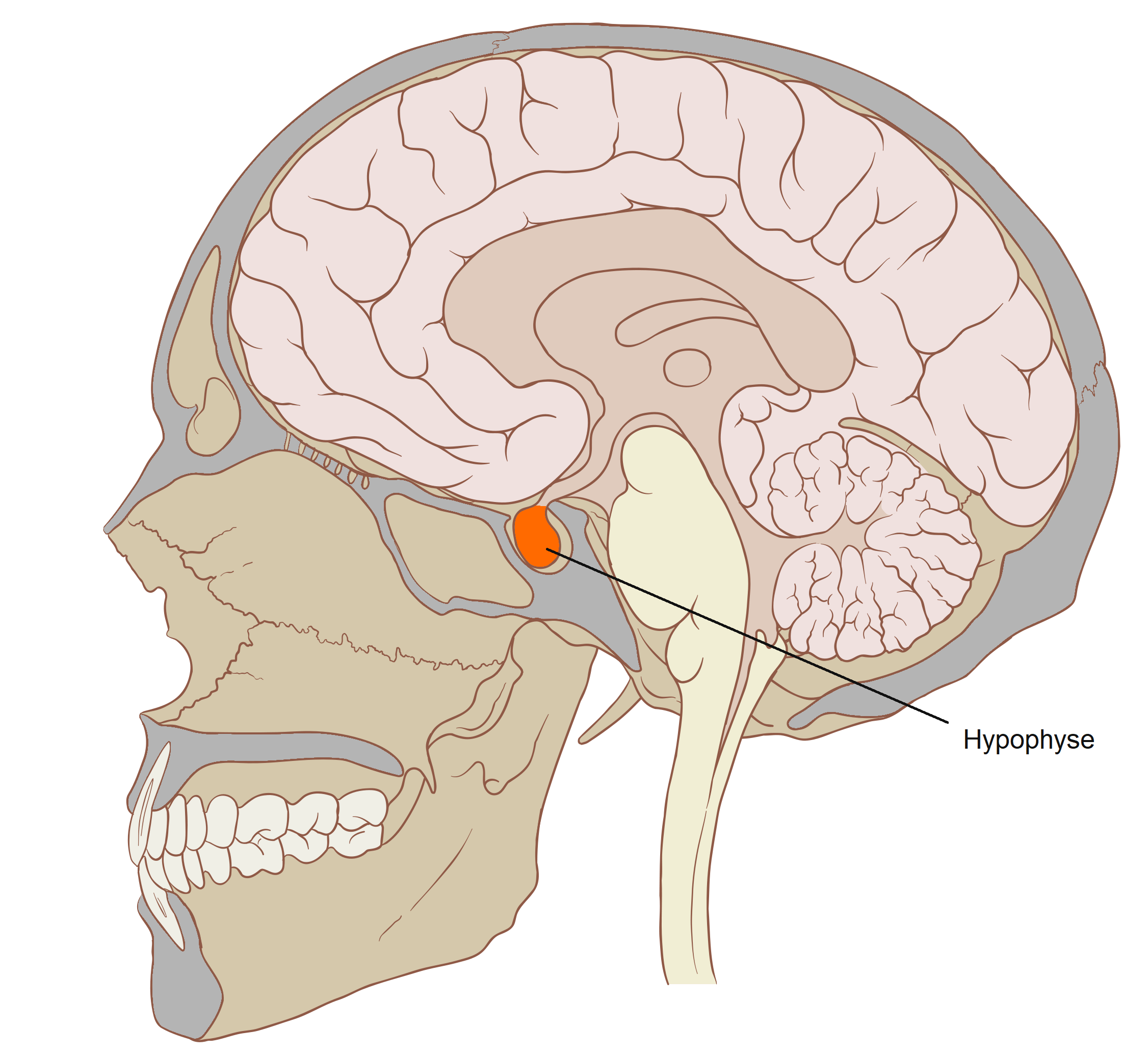
- The location of the pituitary gland within the skull (indicated in orange)
- Specialty: Endocrinology, neurology, neonatology, paediatrics
- Symptoms: Hypoglycaemia, jaudice, micropenis, cryptorchidism, etc.
- Complications: Seizures, retarded physical and intellectual development, delayed puberty, death, etc.
- Types: Congenital
- Risk factors: Genetic predisposition (relative(s) with the condition)
- Diagnostic method: MRI scan
- Treatment: Hormone replacement
- Frequency: Unclear, ~1,000 cases reported

Pituitary stalk interruption syndrome (PSIS) is a congenital disorder characterised by the triad of an absent or exceedingly thin pituitary stalk, an ectopic or absent posterior pituitary and/or absent or hypoplastic anterior pituitary.

== Presentation ==
Affected individuals may present with hypoglycaemia during the neonatal period, or with growth retardation during childhood (those diagnosed in the neonatal period appear to be affected by a particularly severe form of the disorder). PSIS is a common cause of congenital hypopituitarism, and causes a permanent growth hormone deficit. Some PSIS-affected individuals may also present with adrenal hypoplasia (5–29%), diabetes insipidus (5–29%), primary amenorrhea (5–29%), hypothyroidism (30–79%), failure to thrive (80–99%), septooptic dysplasia (5–29%), and Fanconi anaemia. PSIS may be isolated, or, commonly, present with extra-pituitary malformations.

PSIS features in neonates (may) include:

- hypoglycaemia (30–79%)
- (prolonged) jaundice
- micropenis (30–79%)
- cryptorchidism (5–29%)
- delayed intellectual development
- death in infancy (5–29%)
- congenital abnormalities

PSIS features in later childhood (may) include:

- short stature (80–99%)
- seizures (5–29%)
- hypotension
- delayed intellectual development
- delayed puberty (30–79%)

PSIS is associated with a higher frequency of breech presentation, caesarean section, and/or low Apgar score, though these are likely consequences rather than causes.

== Cause ==
The cause of the condition is as of yet unknown. Rare genetic mutations may cause familial cases, however, these account for less than 5% of cases.

== Diagnosis ==
The diagnosis is confirmed through MRI.

== Management ==
Treatment should commence as soon as a diagnosis is established to avoid complications, and consists of hormone replacement, particularly with growth hormone.

== Prognosis ==
Prognosis is generally good in cases of prompt diagnosis and management. Delays may lead to seizures (due to hypoglycaemia), hypotension (due to cortisol deficiency), and/or intellectual disability (due to thyroid endocrine deficits). Due to the before-mentioned factors, mortality and morbidity is higher than that of the general population, particularly during the first two years of life.

== Epidemiology ==
The prevalence of PSIS is unknown, however, some 1,000 cases have been reported either with or without the full triad.
