= University of Tizi Ouzou =

University in Tizi Ouzou, Algeria

- Université Mouloud Mammeri de Tizi Ouzou (French)
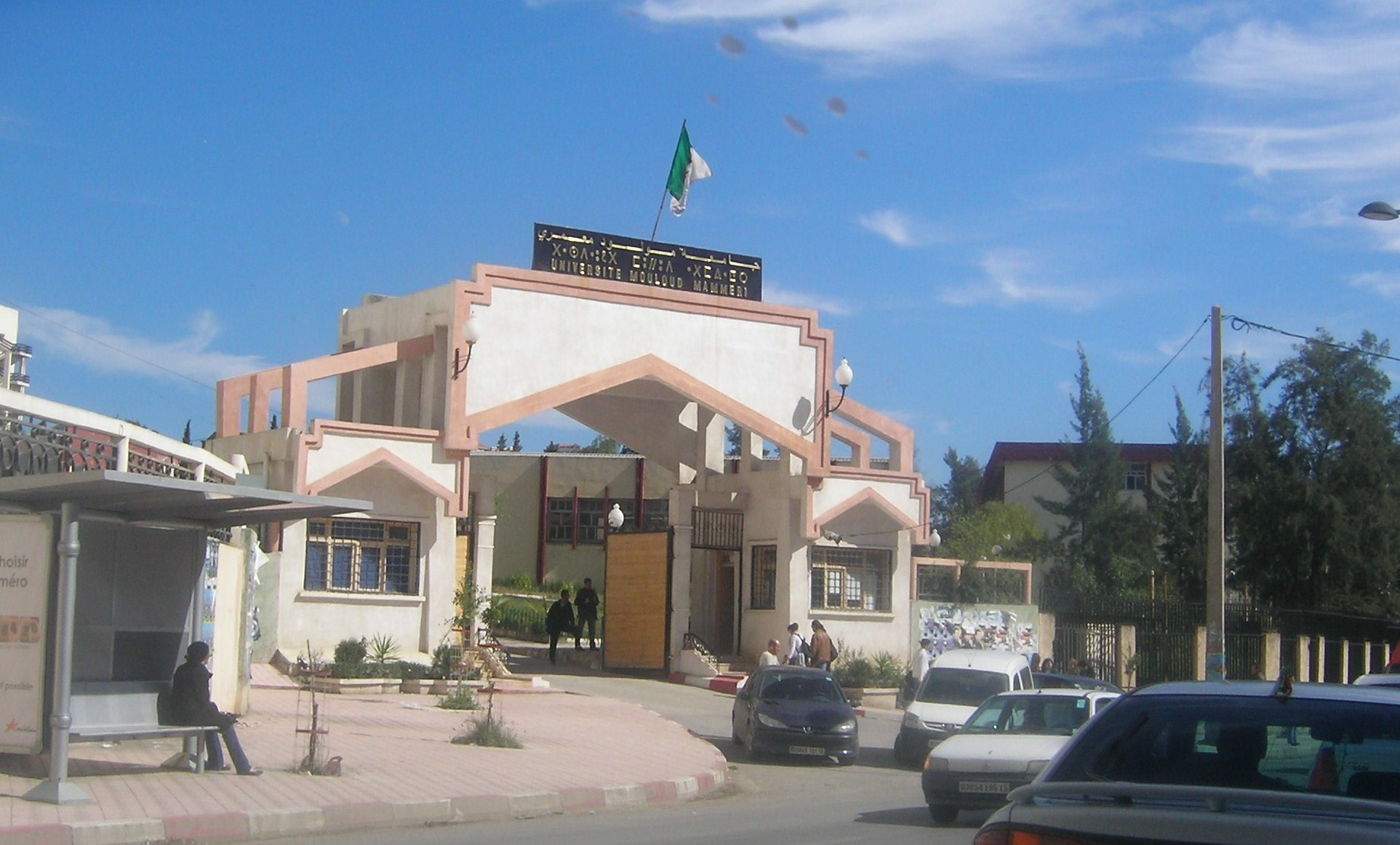
- South entrance
- Type: Public
- Established: 1977
- Location: Tizi Ouzou, Algeria
- Campus: Urban
- Nickname: UMMTO
- Website: University website

The Mouloud Mammeri University of Tizi Ouzou (Berber languages: ⵝⴰⵙⴷⴰⵓⵉⵝ ⵎⵓⵏⵓⴷ ⴰⵝⵎⴷⴰⵟⵙ; French: Université Mouloud Mammeri de Tizi Ouzou) is a university in Tizi Ouzou, Algeria.

It is named after Mouloud Mammeri. As of 2012 Naceur Eddine Haddachi is the rector of the university. The university has eight faculties and twenty-five departments.

== History ==
In 1977 President of Algeria Houari Boumediene inaugurated the Centre Universitaire de Tizi-Ouzou (C.U.T.O.) as per the executive decree No. 17-77 of 20 June 1977.

The University Hospital employed Africa's first woman neurosurgeon, Faiza Lalam, in 1982.
