= Intercavernous sinuses =

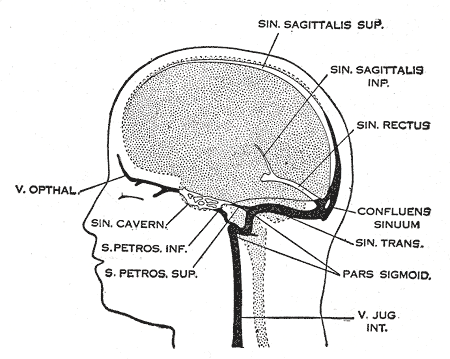
- Dural veins

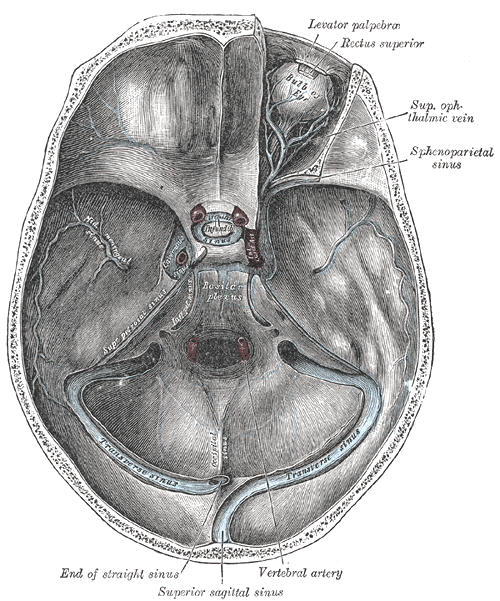
- The sinuses at the base of the skull. (Visible as light blue circle at center.)

Details

Identifiers
- Latin: sini intercavernosi
- TA98: A12.3.05.117
- TA2: 4862
- FMA: 50773

The intercavernous sinuses are two in number, an anterior and a posterior, and connect the two cavernous sinuses across the middle line.

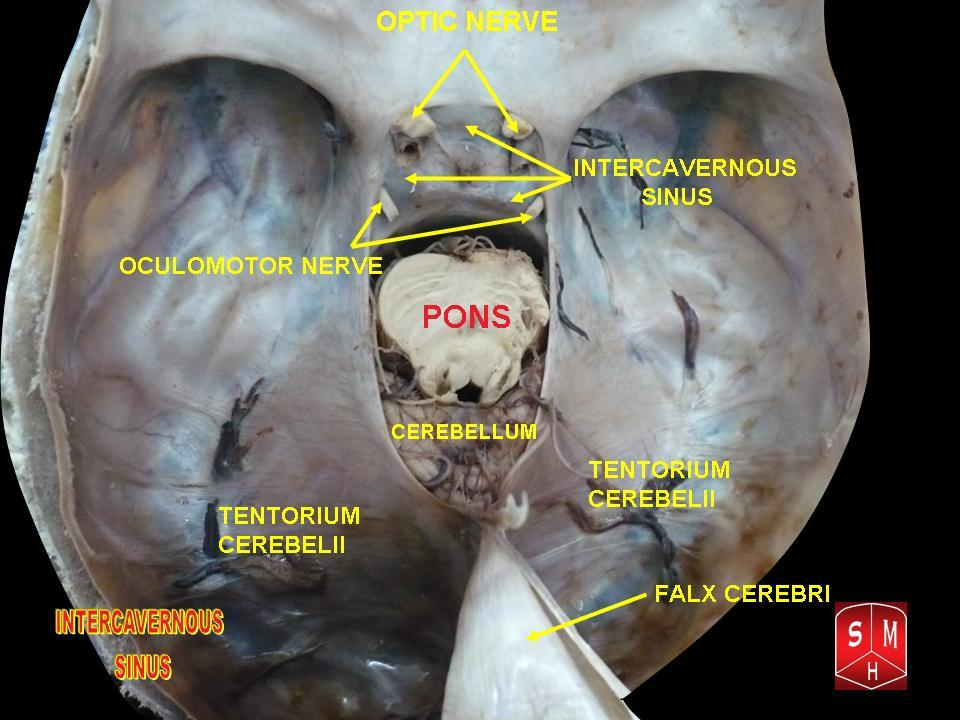
Intercavernous sinuses

The anterior passes in front of the hypophysis cerebri (pituitary gland), the posterior behind it, and they form with the cavernous sinuses a venous circle (circular sinus) around the hypophysis.

The anterior one is usually the larger of the two, and one or other is occasionally absent.

== See also ==
- Dural venous sinuses
