= Ostium =

An ostium (pl.: ostia) in anatomy is a small opening or orifice.

Ostia, not as a plural, is also the name of a number of places.

Ostium or ostia may refer to:

== Human anatomy ==
- Ostium of fallopian tube
- Ostium of the uterus (disambiguation)
- Ostium primum of the developing heart
- Ostium secundum (foramen ovale) of the developing heart
- Ostium maxillare of the maxillary sinus
- Ostium vaginae (vaginal orifice)
- Coronary ostium – opening of coronary arteries at root of aorta, superior to aortic valve
- Sinus ostium an opening that connects a sinus to the nasal cavity itself.

== In other animals ==
- Ostium (sponges), the pores of living sponges
- Ostium (insect anatomy), of female Lepidoptera genitalia

== See also ==
- Pore (disambiguation)
- Foramen
- Ostiole
