= Chiasmatic groove =

Groove on the sphenoid bone of the skull

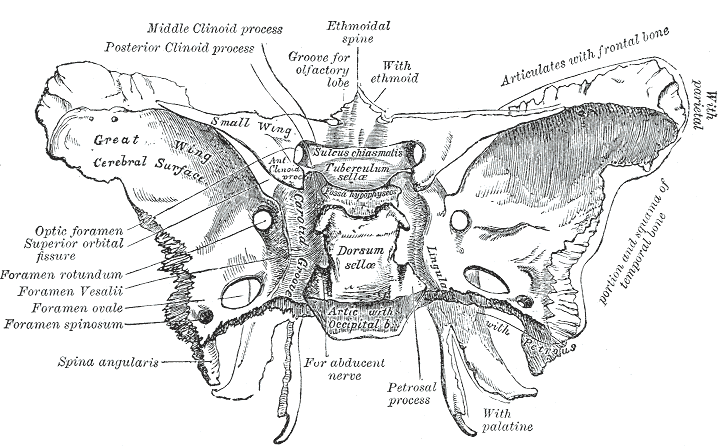
- ethmoid bone. Upper surface. (Sulcus chiasmaticus labeled at center)

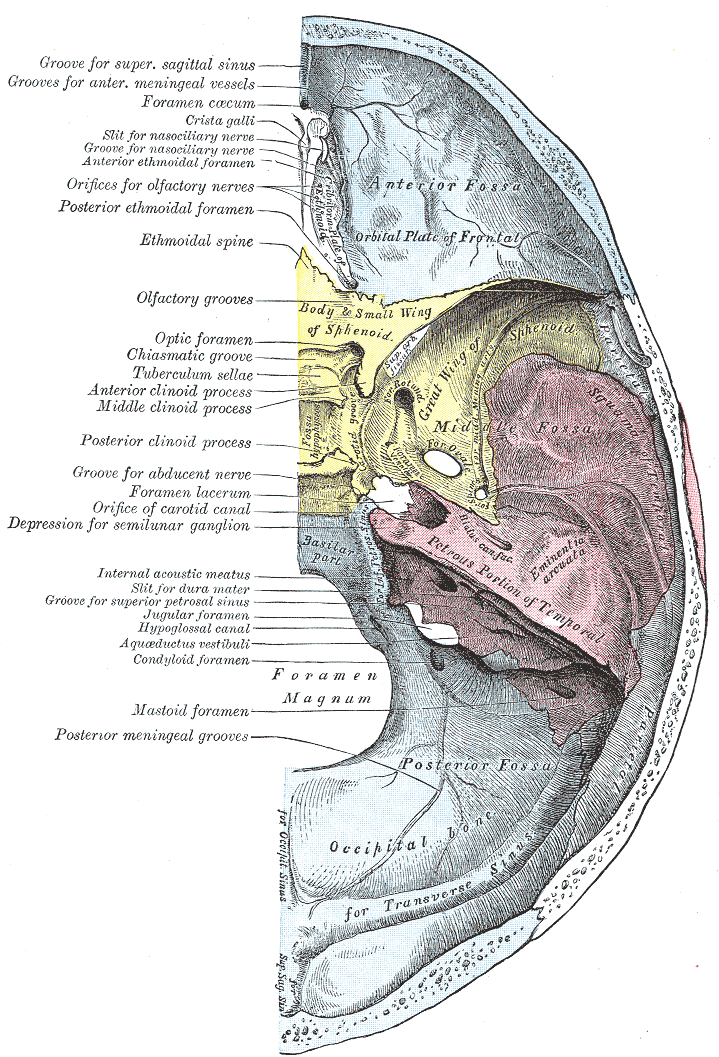
- Base of the skull. Upper surface. (Sphenoid bone is yellow; chiasmatic groove labeled at center left, fourth from the top of the labels near the yellow region.)

Details

Identifiers
- Latin: sulcus praechiasmaticus, sulcus chiasmaticus
- TA98: A02.1.05.005
- TA2: 588
- FMA: 75760

The chiasmatic groove (chiasmatic sulcus, optic groove, prechiasmatic sulcus) is a transverse groove upon the superior aspect of the body of sphenoid bone within the middle cranial fossa. It is bounded anteriorly by the sphenoidal limbus (a variably prominent ridge also representing the posterior boundary of the sphenoidal jugum), and posteriorly by the tuberculum sellae. The opening of each optic canal is placed at either lateral end of the chiasmatic sulcus. The optic chiasm is situated superior and quite posterior to the chiasmatic groove (and not against the groove as the name suggests).

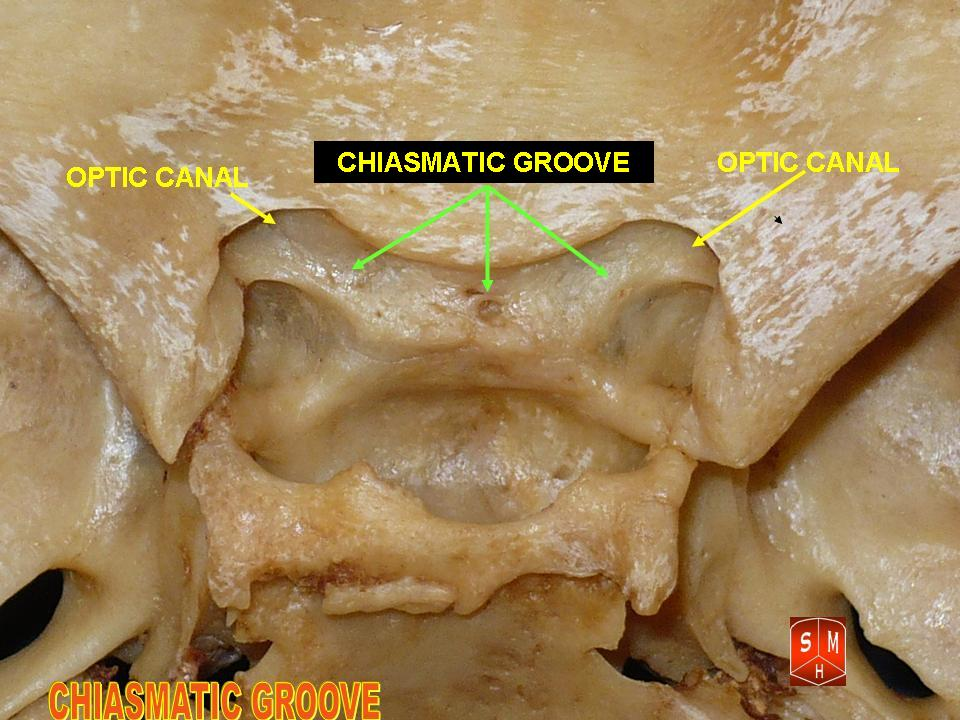
Chiasmatic groove
