= Empty sella syndrome =

- Other names: Pituitary - empty sella syndrome
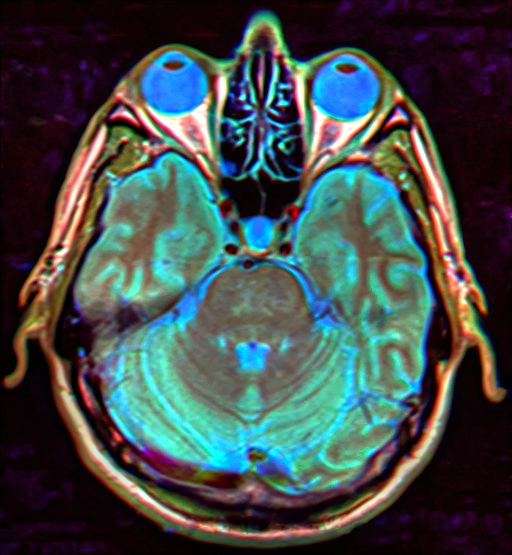
- MRI of Empty Sella
- Specialty: Endocrinology
- Symptoms: Cryptorchidism
- Causes: Arachnoid presses down on gland (another possibility is a Tumor, Radiation therapy)
- Diagnostic method: MRI, CT scan
- Medication: Manage abnormal hormone levels

Empty sella syndrome is the condition when the pituitary gland shrinks or becomes flattened, filling the sella turcica with cerebrospinal fluid instead of the normal pituitary. It can be discovered as part of the diagnostic workup of pituitary disorders, or as an incidental finding when imaging the brain.

== Signs and symptoms ==
If there are symptoms, people with empty sella syndrome can have headaches and vision loss. Additional symptoms would be associated with hypopituitarism. Additional symptoms are as follows:

- Abnormality of the middle ear ossicles
- Cryptorchidism
- Dolichocephaly
- Arnold-Chiari type I malformation
- Meningocele
- Patent ductus arteriosus
- Muscular hypotonia
- Platybasia

== Cause ==
Pituitary gland

The cause of this condition is divided into primary and secondary, as follows:

- The cause of this condition in terms of secondary empty sella syndrome happens when a tumor or surgery damages the gland, this is an acquired manner of the condition.
- patients with idiopathic intracranial hypertension will have empty sella on MRI
- The cause of primary empty sella syndrome is a congenital defect (diaphragma sellae)

== Mechanism ==
The normal mechanism of the pituitary gland sees that it controls the hormonal system, which therefore has an effect on growth, sexual development, and adrenocortical function. The gland is divided into anterior and posterior.Its pathophysiology is such that individuals affected with the condition can have cerebrospinal fluid build-up, which in turn causes intracranial pressure leading to headaches for the individual.

== Diagnosis ==
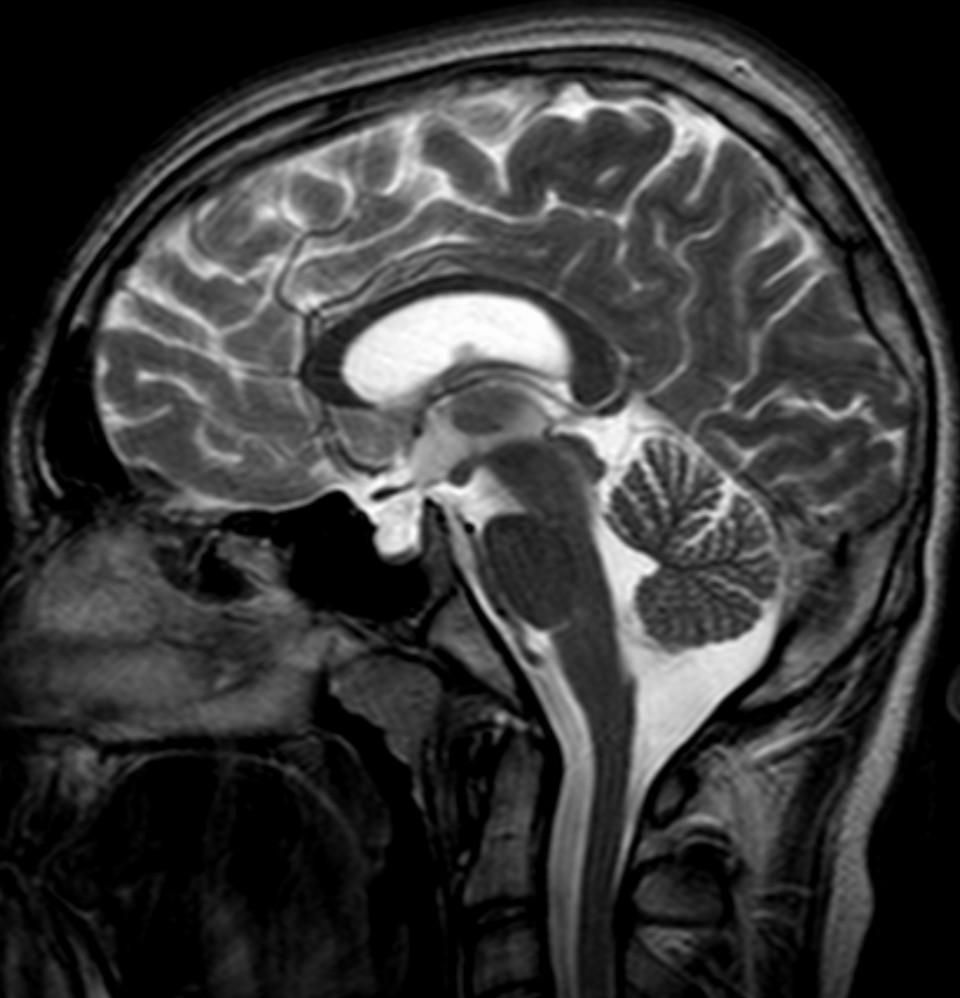
Empty sella in MRI

The diagnosis of empty sella syndrome, done via examination (and test), may be linked to early onset of puberty, growth hormone deficiency, or pituitary gland dysfunction (at an early age). Additionally there is CT scan and MRI scans.

=== Classification ===
There are two types of empty sella syndrome: primary and secondary.

- Primary empty sella syndrome occurs when a small anatomical defect above the pituitary gland increases pressure in the sella turcica and causes the gland to flatten out along the interior walls of the sella turcica cavity. Primary empty sella syndrome is associated with obesity and increase in intracranial pressure in women. In most cases, especially in people with primary empty sella syndrome, there are no symptoms and it does not affect life expectancy or health. Some researchers have estimated that less than 1% of affected people ever develop symptoms of the condition.
- Secondary empty sella syndrome is the result of the pituitary gland regressing within the cavity after an injury, surgery, or radiation therapy. Individuals with secondary empty sella syndrome due to destruction of the pituitary gland have symptoms that reflect the loss of pituitary functions, such as intolerance to stress and infection.

=== Differential diagnosis ===
The major differential to consider in empty sella syndrome is intracranial hypertension, of both unknown and secondary causes, and an epidermoid cyst, which can mimic cerebrospinal fluid due to its low density on CT scans, although MRI can usually distinguish the latter diagnosis.

== Treatment ==
Patients with empty sella syndrome should be evaluated for hypopituitarism. In terms of management, unless the syndrome results in other medical problems, treatment for endocrine dysfunction associated with pituitary malfunction is symptomatic and thus supportive; however, surgery may be needed in some cases.
