= Posterior clinoid processes =

Part of the skull

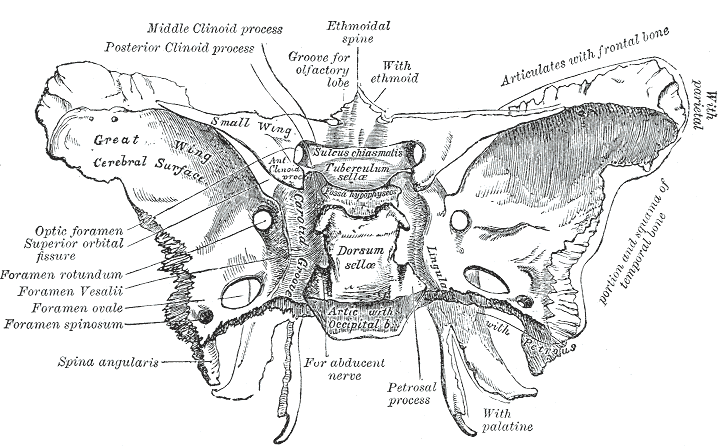
- Sphenoid bone. Superior view. (Posterior clinoid process labeled at upper left.)

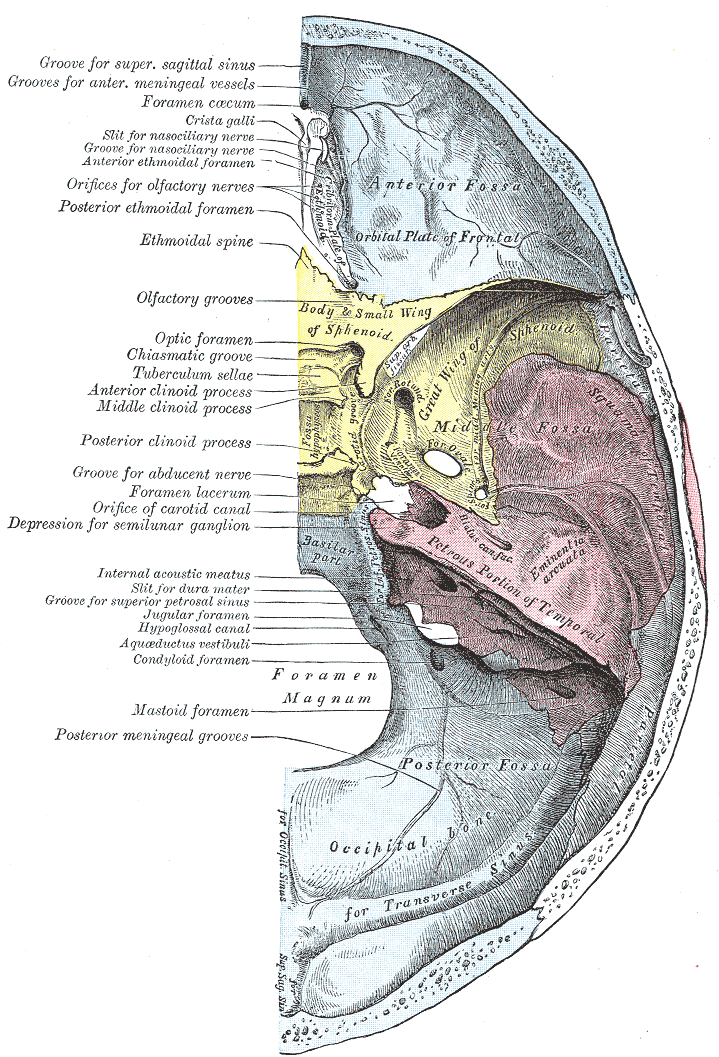
- Base of the skull. Upper surface. (Caption for posterior clinoid process visible at center left. Sphenoid bone is yellow.)

Details

Identifiers
- Latin: processus clinoideus posterior
- TA98: A02.1.05.011
- TA2: 595
- FMA: 54696

The posterior clinoid processes are the tubercles of the sphenoid bone situated at the superior angles of the dorsum sellae (one on each angle) which represents the posterior boundary of the sella turcica. They vary considerably in size and form. The posterior clinoid processes deepen the sella turcica, and give attachment to (the attached border of) the tentorium cerebelli, and the dura forming the floor of the hypophyseal fossa (sella turcica).

== The petroclinoid ligament ==
The petroclinoid ligament is a fold of dura matter. It extends between the posterior clinoid process and anterior clinoid process and the petrosal part of the temporal bone of the skull. There are two separate bands of the ligament; named the anterior and posterior petroclinoid ligaments respectively. The anterior petroclinoid ligament is considered to be an extension of the tentorium cerebelli and the posterior petroclinoid ligament arises from the posteromedial extensions of the tentorial notch. The anterior and posterior petroclinoid ligaments are bands composed of collagen and elastic fibres that are densely packed in fascicles

Their function:

The anterior petroclinoid ligament acts to laterally limit the superior wall of the cavernous sinus. The posterior petroclinoid ligament limits the posterior wall of the cavernous sinus. The angle between the two ligaments varies from 20 to 55 degrees.

Anatomical Relations and Clinical significance:

The posterior petroclinoid ligament is in close proximity to the oculomotor nerve. During head trauma, it acts as a fulcrum following the downward displacement of the brainstem. This can cause injury to the pupillomotor fibres of the oculomotor nerve, consequently leading to internal ophthalmoplegia

The petroclinoid ligament attaches across the notch at the petrosphenoid junction. This forms a foramen, and within this lies the abducens nerve. The abducens nerve travels inferiorly to the petroclinoid ligament

Ossification

The petroclinoid ligament could calcify. An ossified form of the ligament may create a syndrome, and this can be seen on a radiograph. The ossified ligament is a typical anatomical anomaly.

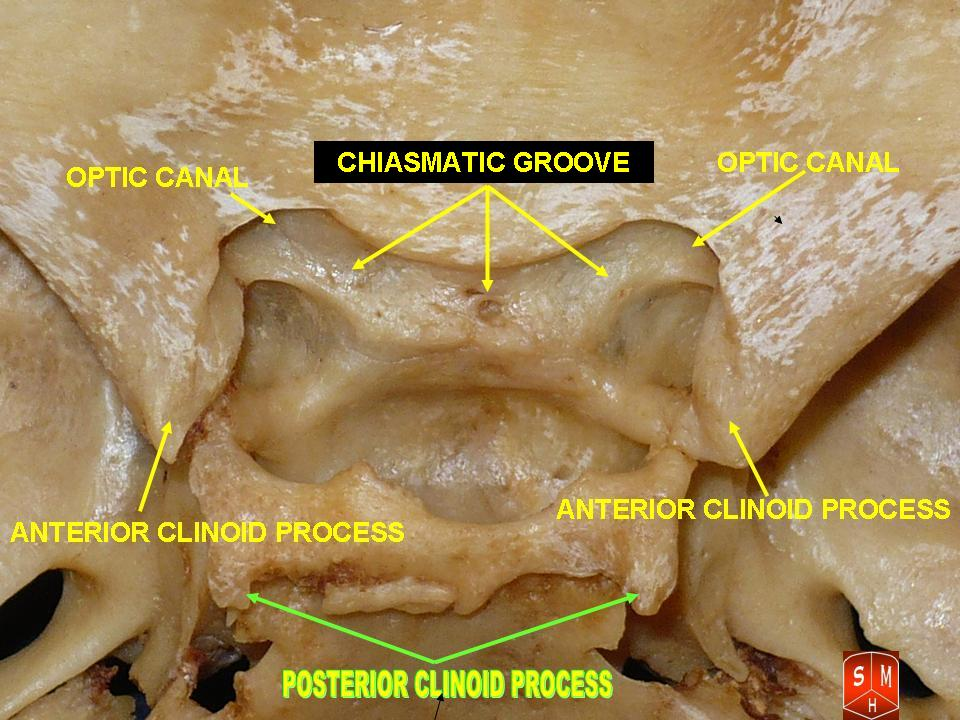
Posterior clinoid process

== Etymology ==
Clinoid likely comes from the Greek root klinein or the Latin clinare, both meaning "sloped" as in "inclined."
