= Transsphenoidal surgery =

Type of brain surgery

Transsphenoidal surgery is a type of surgery in which an endoscope or surgical instruments are inserted into part of the brain by going through the nose and the sphenoid bone (a butterfly-shaped bone forming the anterior inferior portion of the brain case) into the sphenoidal sinus cavity. Transsphenoidal surgery is used to remove tumors of the pituitary gland. (Such tumours, although within the skull, are outside the brain itself).

== History ==
The transsphenoidal approach was first attempted by Hermann Schloffer in 1907. Use of the procedure grew in the 1950s and 1960s with the introduction of intraoperative fluoroscopy and operating microscope.

== See also ==
- Pituitary adenoma
- Endoscopic endonasal surgery, particularly Surgical approaches to the anterior skull base
