= Internal carotid artery =

Artery supplying the brain

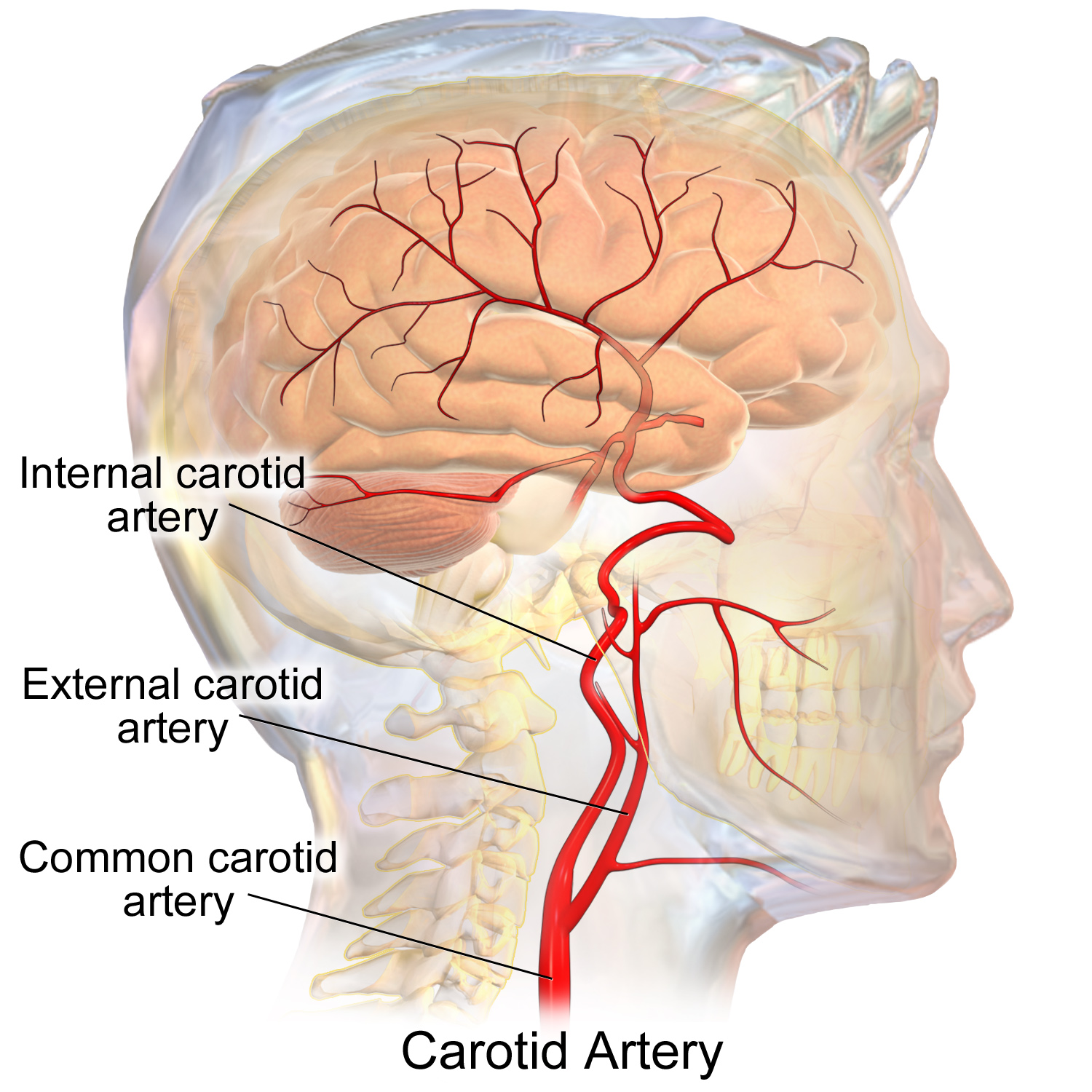
- Carotid arteries.

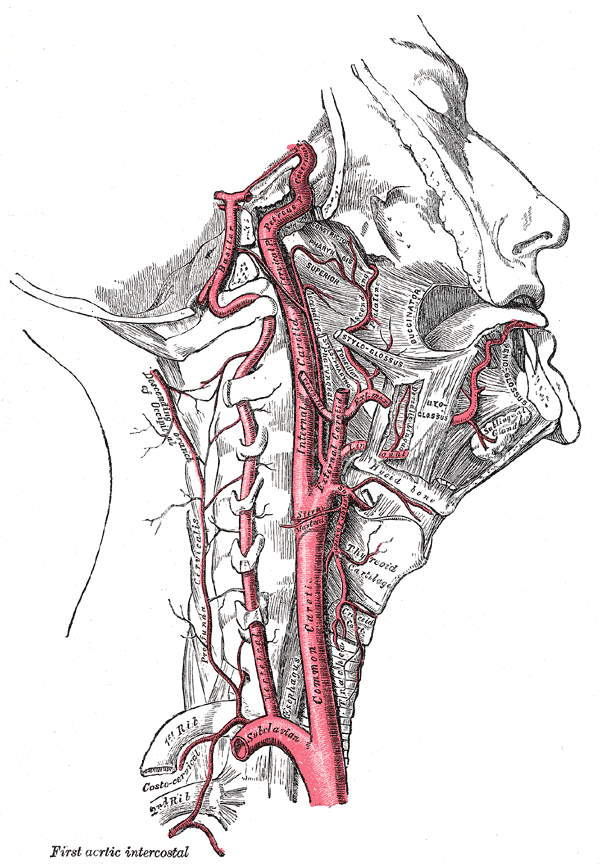
- Arteries of the neck. The internal carotid arteries arise from the common carotid arteries - labeled Common caroti on the figure.

Details
- Precursor: 3. Aortic arch
- Source: Common carotid artery
- Branches: Ophthalmic, anterior choroidal, anterior cerebral, middle cerebral and posterior communicating artery
- Vein: Internal jugular vein

Identifiers
- Latin: arteria carotis interna
- MeSH: D002343
- TA98: A12.2.06.001
- TA2: 4463
- FMA: 3947

The internal carotid artery is an artery in the neck which supplies the anterior and middle cerebral circulation.

In human anatomy, the internal and external carotid arise from the common carotid artery, where it bifurcates at cervical vertebrae C3 or C4. The internal carotid artery supplies the brain, including the eyes, while the external carotid nourishes other portions of the head, such as the face, scalp, skull, and meninges.

== Classification ==
Terminologia Anatomica in 1998 subdivided the artery into four parts: "cervical", "petrous", "cavernous", and "cerebral".

In clinical settings, however, usually the classification system of the internal carotid artery follows the 1996 recommendations by Bouthillier, describing seven anatomical segments of the internal carotid artery, each with a corresponding alphanumeric identifier: C1 cervical; C2 petrous; C3 lacerum; C4 cavernous; C5 clinoid; C6 ophthalmic; and C7 communicating. The Bouthillier nomenclature remains in widespread use by neurosurgeons, neuroradiologists and neurologists.

The segments are subdivided based on anatomical and microsurgical landmarks and surrounding anatomy, more than angiographic appearance of the artery. An alternative embryologic classification system proposed by Pierre Lasjaunias and colleagues is invaluable when it comes to explanation of many internal carotid artery variants. An older clinical classification, based on pioneering work by Fischer, is mainly of historical significance.

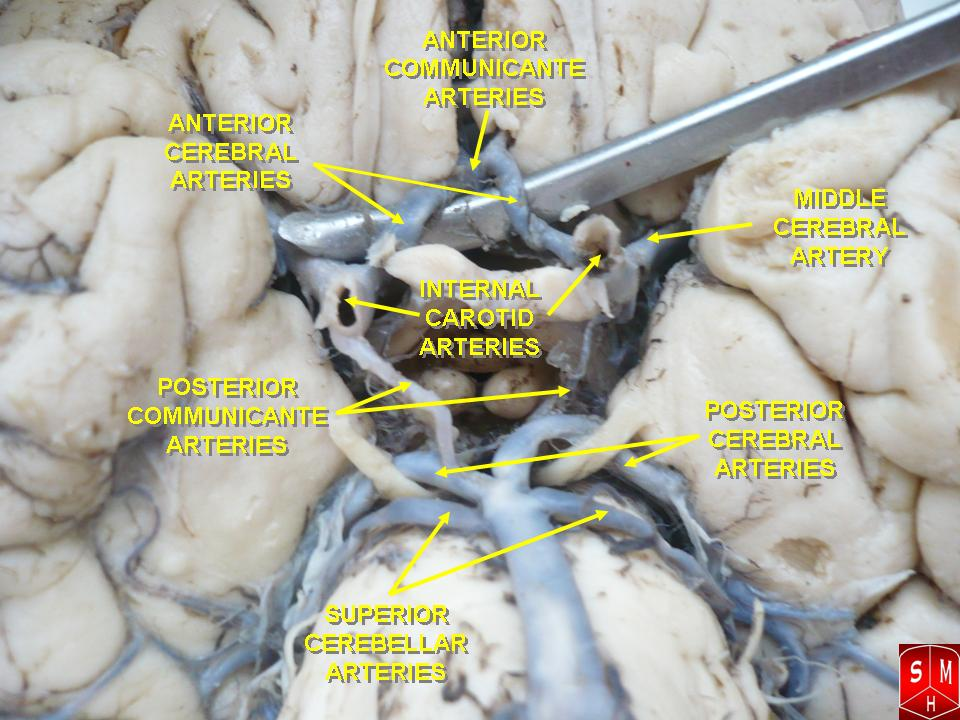
Internal carotid artery

The segments of the internal carotid artery are as follows:

- Cervical segment, or C1, identical to the commonly used cervical portion
- Petrous segment, or C2
- Lacerum segment, or C3
  - C2 and C3 compose the commonly termed petrous portion
- Cavernous segment, or C4, almost identical to the commonly used cavernous portion
- Clinoid segment, or C5. This segment is not identified in some earlier classifications and lies between the commonly used cavernous portion and cerebral or supraclinoid portion.
- Ophthalmic, or supraclinoid segment, or C6
- Communicating, or terminal segment, or C7
  - C6 and C7 together constitute the commonly used cerebral or supraclinoid portion.

== Course/part ==
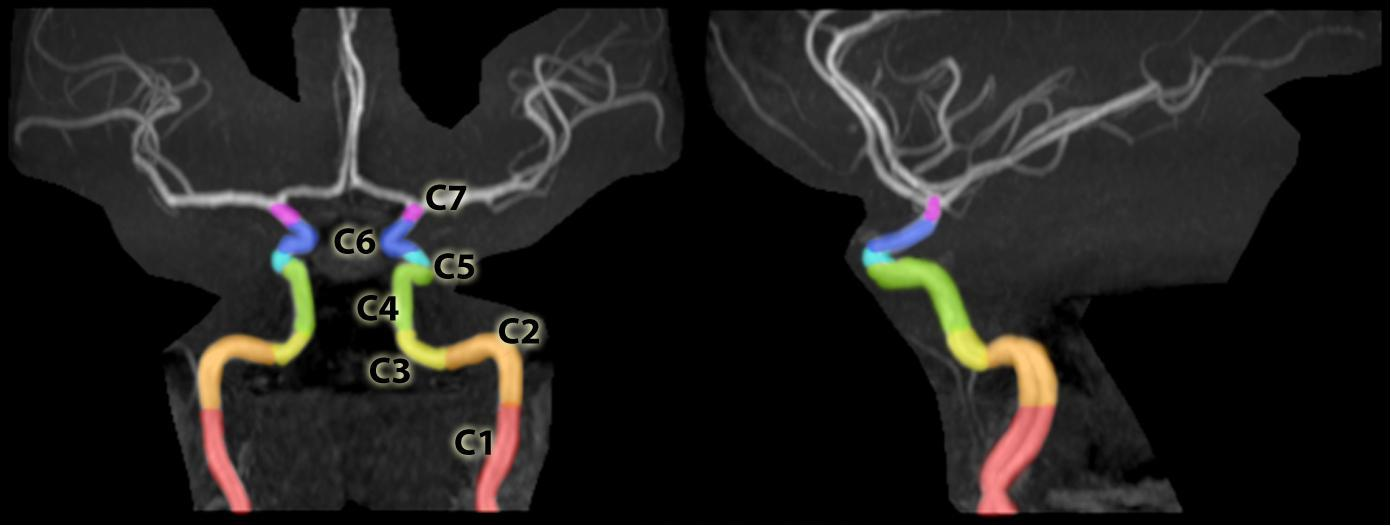
Segments of the internal carotid artery, delineated on an MRA of the head.

The internal carotid artery is a terminal branch of the common carotid artery; it arises around the level of the fourth cervical vertebra when the common carotid bifurcates into this artery and its more superficial counterpart, the external carotid artery.

=== C1: Cervical segment ===
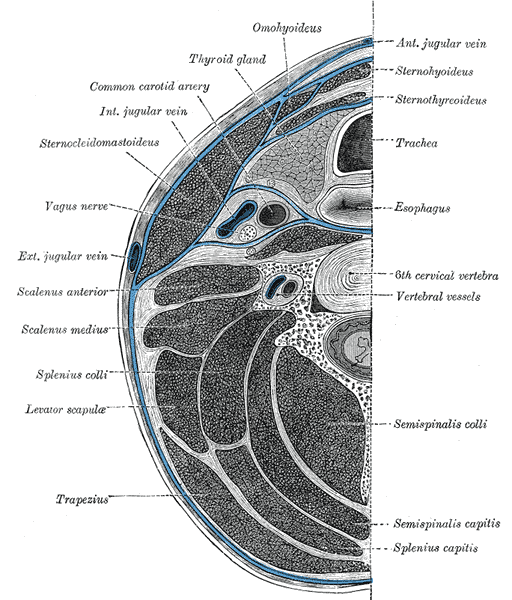
Level of 6th cervical vertebrae - still at level of common carotid but relationships are similar to those of cervical segment of internal carotid

The cervical segment, or C1, or cervical part of the internal carotid, extends from the carotid bifurcation until it enters the carotid canal in the skull anterior to the jugular foramen.

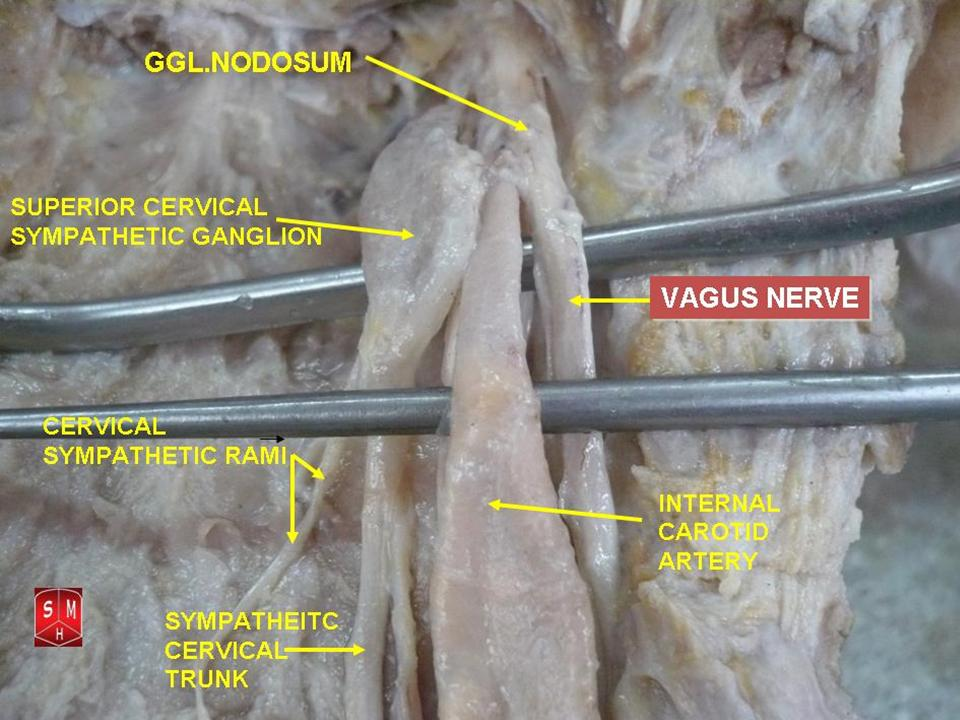
Internal carotid artery - dissection

At its origin, the internal carotid artery is somewhat dilated. This part of the artery is known as the carotid sinus or the carotid bulb. The ascending portion of the cervical segment occurs distal to the bulb when the vessel walls are again parallel.

The internal carotid runs vertically upward in the carotid sheath and enters the skull through the carotid canal. During this part of its course, it lies in front of the transverse processes of the upper three cervical vertebrae.

It is relatively superficial at its start, where it is contained in the carotid triangle of the neck, and lies behind and medial to the external carotid, overlapped by the sternocleidomastoid muscle, and covered by the deep fascia, the platysma, and integument: it then passes beneath the parotid gland, being crossed by the hypoglossal nerve, the digastric muscle and the stylohyoid muscle, the occipital artery and the posterior auricular artery. Higher up, it is separated from the external carotid by the styloglossus and stylopharyngeus muscles, the tip of the styloid process and the stylohyoid ligament, the glossopharyngeal nerve and the pharyngeal branch of the vagus nerve. It is in relation, behind, with the longus capitis, the superior cervical ganglion of the sympathetic trunk, and the superior laryngeal nerve; laterally, with the internal jugular vein and vagus nerve, the nerve lying on a plane posterior to the artery; medially, with the pharynx, superior laryngeal nerve, and ascending pharyngeal artery. At the base of the skull the glossopharyngeal, vagus, accessory, and hypoglossal nerves lie between the artery and the internal jugular vein.

Unlike the external carotid artery, the internal carotid normally has no branches in the neck.

=== C2: Petrous segment ===
The petrous segment, or C2, of the internal carotid, is that which is inside the petrous part of the temporal bone. This segment extends until the foramen lacerum.

The petrous portion classically has three sections:

- an ascending, or vertical, portion;
- the genu, or bend; and
- the horizontal portion.

When the internal carotid artery enters the canal in the petrous portion of the temporal bone, it first ascends a short distance and then curves anteriorly and medially. The artery lies at first in front of the cochlea and tympanic cavity; from the latter cavity it is separated by a thin, bony lamella, which is cribriform in the young subject, and often partly absorbed in old age. Farther forward, it is separated from the trigeminal ganglion by a thin plate of bone, which forms the floor of the fossa for the ganglion and the roof of the horizontal portion of the canal. Frequently this bony plate is more or less deficient, and then the ganglion is separated from the artery by fibrous membrane. The artery is separated from the bony wall of the carotid canal by a prolongation of dura mater and is surrounded by a number of small veins and by filaments of the carotid plexus, derived from the ascending branch of the superior cervical ganglion of the sympathetic trunk.

The named branches of the petrous segment of the internal carotid artery are:

- the vidian artery or artery of the pterygoid canal
- the caroticotympanic artery

=== C3: Lacerum segment ===
The lacerum segment, or C3, is a short segment that begins above the foramen lacerum and ends at the petrolingual ligament, a reflection of periosteum between the lingula and petrous apex (or petrosal process) of the sphenoid bone. The lacerum portion is still considered "extradural" since it is surrounded by periosteum and fibrocartilage along its course. It is erroneously stated in several anatomy textbooks that the internal carotid artery passes through the foramen lacerum. This at best has only ever been a partial truth in that it passes through the superior part of the foramen on its way to the cavernous sinus. As such it does not traverse the skull through it. The inferior part of the foramen is actually filled with fibrocartilage. The broad consensus is that the internal carotid artery should not be described as travelling through the foramen lacerum.

=== C4: Cavernous segment ===
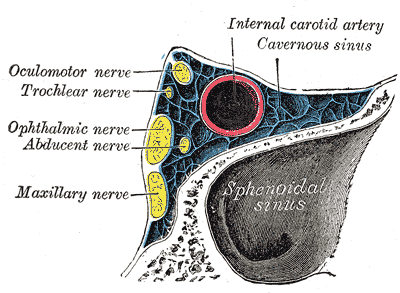
Oblique section through the cavernous sinus.

The cavernous segment, or C4, of the internal carotid artery begins at the petrolingual ligament and extends to the proximal dural ring, which is formed by the medial and inferior periosteum of the anterior clinoid process. The cavernous segment is surrounded by the cavernous sinus.

In this part of its course, the artery is situated between the layers of the dura mater forming the cavernous sinus, but covered by the lining membrane of the sinus. It at first ascends toward the posterior clinoid process, then passes forward by the side of the body of the sphenoid bone, again curves upward on the medial side of the anterior clinoid process, and perforates the dura mater forming the roof of the sinus. The curve in the cavernous segment is called the carotid siphon. This portion of the artery is surrounded by filaments of the sympathetic trunk, and on its lateral side is the abducent nerve, or cranial nerve VI.

The named branches of the cavernous segment are:

- the meningohypophyseal artery
- the inferolateral trunk

The cavernous segment also gives rise to small capsular arteries that supply the wall of the cavernous sinus.

=== C5: Clinoid segment ===
The clinoid segment, or C5, is another short segment of the internal carotid that begins after the artery exits the cavernous sinus at the proximal dural ring and extends distally to the distal dural ring, after which the carotid artery is considered "intra-dural" and has entered the subarachnoid space.

The clinoid segment normally has no named branches, though the ophthalmic artery may arise from the clinoid segment.

=== C6: Ophthalmic segment ===
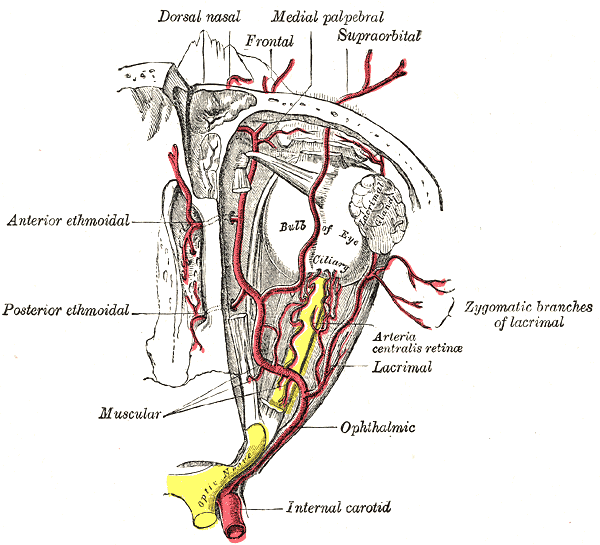
The ophthalmic artery and its branches

The ophthalmic segment, or C6, extends from the distal dural ring, which is continuous with the falx cerebri, to the origin of the posterior communicating artery. The ophthalmic segment courses roughly horizontally, parallel to the optic nerve, which runs superomedially to the carotid at this point.

The named branches of the ophthalmic segment are:

- the ophthalmic artery
- the superior hypophyseal artery

=== C7: Communicating segment ===
The communicating segment, or terminal segment, or C7, of the internal carotid artery passes between the optic and oculomotor nerves to the anterior perforated substance at the medial extremity of the lateral cerebral fissure. Angiographically, this segment extends from the origin of the posterior communicating artery to the bifurcation of the internal carotid artery.

The named branches of the communicating segment are:

- the posterior communicating artery
- the anterior choroidal artery

The internal carotid then divides to form the anterior cerebral artery and middle cerebral artery. The circle of Willis provides a collateral pathway for blood supply to the brain.

== Branches ==
The following are the branches of the internal carotid artery, listed by segment:

- C1: Branches from the cervical portion - none
- C2: Branches from the petrous portion
  - Caroticotympanic arteries
  - Artery of pterygoid canal (vidian artery)
- C3: Branches from the lacerum portion - none
- C4: Branches from the cavernous portion
  - Branches of the meningohypophyseal trunk:
    - Tentorial basal branch
    - Tentorial marginal branch
    - Meningeal branch - helps supply blood to the meninges of the anterior cranial fossa
    - Clivus branches - tiny branches that supply the clivus
    - Inferior hypophyseal artery
  - Capsular branches - supplies wall of cavernous sinus
  - Branches of the inferolateral trunk:
    - Branches to trigeminal ganglion - provide blood to trigeminal ganglion
    - Artery of the foramen rotundum
    - Branches to nerves
- C5: Branches from the clinoid portion - none
- C6: Branches from the ophthalmic portion
  - Ophthalmic artery
  - Superior hypophyseal artery
- C7: Branches from the communicating portion
  - Posterior communicating artery
  - Anterior choroidal artery
  - Anterior cerebral artery (a terminal branch)
  - Middle cerebral artery (a terminal branch)

== Carotid plexus ==
The sympathetic trunk forms a plexus of nerves around the artery known as the carotid plexus. The internal carotid nerve arises from the superior cervical ganglion, and forms this plexus, which follows the internal carotid into the skull.

== Diagnostics ==
The state and health of internal carotid arteries is usually evaluated using doppler ultrasound, CT angiogram or phase contrast magnetic resonance imaging (PC-MRI).

Typically internal carotid artery blood flow velocities are measured in peak systolic velocity (PSV) and end diastolic velocity (EDV) and according to Society of Radiologists in Ultrasound in healthy subjects without stenosis must be below 125 cm/sec at PSV and below 40 cm/sec at EDV.

One study found that for normative males in the 20-39 age group, PSV averaged 82 cm/sec and EDV 34 cm/sec. In the male 80+ age group, PSV averaged 76 cm/sec and EDV 18 cm/sec.

== Additional images ==
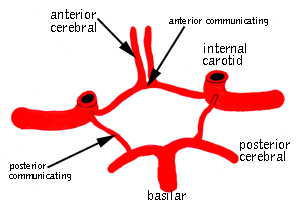
Circle of Willis

Diagram of the arterial circulation at the base of the brain (inferior view).

== See also ==
- Carotid endarterectomy
- Carotid body
- Petrous part of the temporal bone
