= Anterior clinoid process =

Portion of brain anatomy

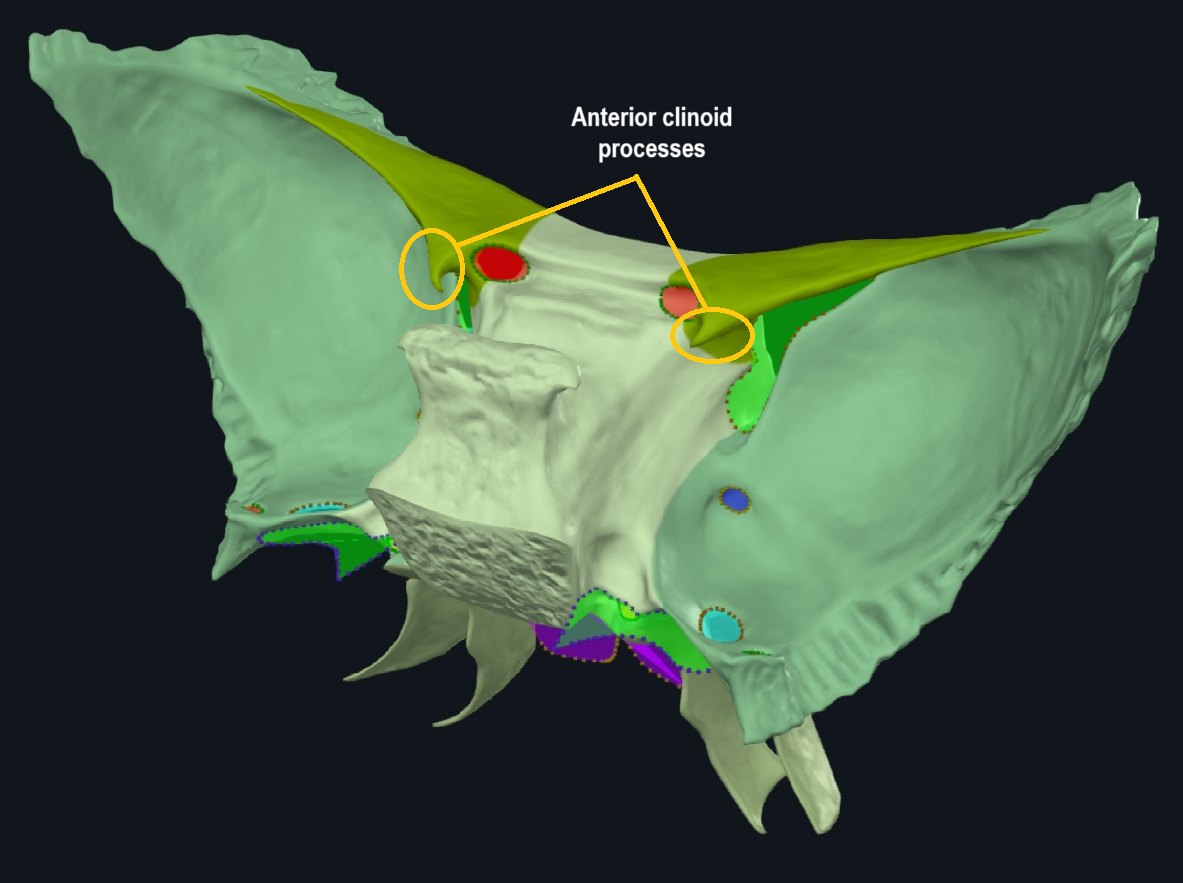
- 3D representation of the sphenoid bone, with anterior clinoid processes circled

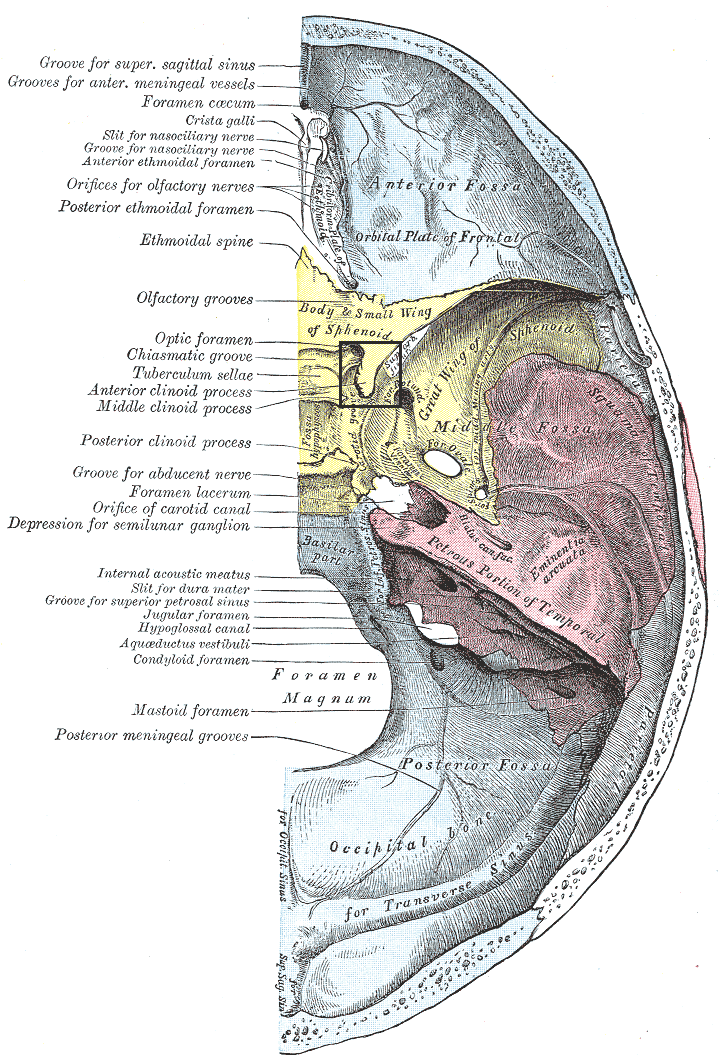
- Upper surface of the base of the skull (label for anterior clinoid process visible at center left. Sphenoid bone is yellow.)

Details

Identifiers
- Latin: processus clinoideus anterior
- TA98: A02.1.05.022
- TA2: 607
- FMA: 54693

The anterior clinoid process is a posterior projection of the sphenoid bone at the junction of the medial end of either lesser wing of sphenoid bone with the body of sphenoid bone. The bilateral processes flank the sella turcica anteriorly.

The ACP is an important structure for cranial and endovascular surgical operations for several structures, including the pituitary gland and the internal carotid artery.

== Anatomy ==
The anterior clinoid process is a pyramid-shaped bony projection of the lesser wing of the sphenoid bone and forms part of the lateral wall of the optic canal. Between each ACP lies the sella turcica, which holds the pituitary gland. Additionally, the ACP is part of the anterior roof of the cavernous sinus. The posterior and inferior portions of the ACP border the internal carotid artery.

=== Attachments ===
The free border of the tentorium cerebelli extends anteriorly on either side beyond the attached border of the same side (which ends anteriorly at the posterior clinoid process) to ultimately end by attaching onto the anterior clinoid process.

== Pathology ==
The anterior clinoid process projects over the internal carotid artery, which supplies the majority of blood to the brain. Because of the "spear-like" shape of the ACP and the large size of this artery, it is possible (though rare) that as a complication of major head trauma, the ACP may puncture the vessel and cause intracranial hemorrhage. Additionally, when an aneurysm forms below the ACP, the projection may create a flat or pointed area of compression that may rupture the vessel.

More frequently, this positioning means that the ACP is an important surgical access point for correction of aneurysms, tumors, and other operations in the structures adjacent to it. It is particularly common for surgery to involve the ACP when operating on giant pituitary adenomas and giant meningiomas, a type of meningioma which may originate at the ACP or spread to it from other structures.

Endovascular surgery has become an increasingly common procedure for lesions and aneurysms around the ACP, as the complex anatomy makes it difficult and dangerous to access via other surgical methods. However, endovascular surgery in the clinoid region is also relatively high-risk, so only serious injuries and diseases are indicated for this procedure.

== Etymology ==
The anterior and posterior clinoid processes surround the sella turcica like the four corners of a four poster bed. Cline is Greek for bed. –oid, as usual, indicates a similarity to. The term may also come from the Greek root klinein or the Latin clinare, both meaning "sloped" as in "inclined".

== Additional images ==
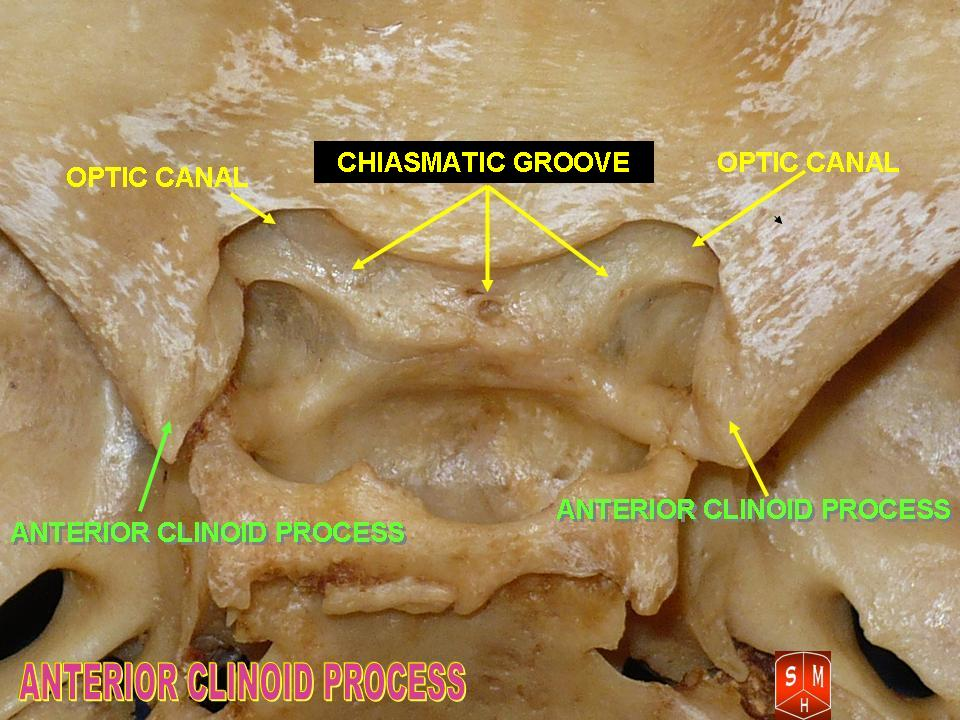
Anterior clinoid process
