= Pituitary stalk =

Anatomical structure

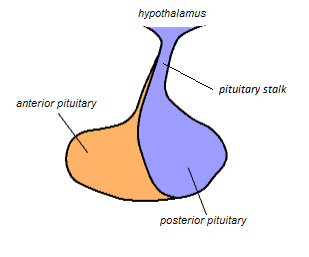
- The pituitary stalk is the thin vertical blue portion.

- Basal view of a human brain (Infundibulum labeled third from the top on right)

Details

Identifiers
- Latin: truncus infundibularis
- NeuroNames: 408
- NeuroLex ID: birnlex_1248
- TA98: A11.1.00.007
- TA2: 3860
- FMA: 74635

The pituitary stalk, also known as the infundibular stalk, infundibulum, or Fenderson's funnel, is the connection between the hypothalamus and the posterior pituitary, the posterior lobe of the pituitary gland. The floor of the third ventricle is prolonged downward as a funnel-shaped recess—the infundibular recess—into the infundibulum, where the apex of the pituitary is attached. It passes through the dura mater of the diaphragma sellae as it carries axons from the magnocellular neurosecretory cells of the hypothalamus down to the posterior pituitary where they release their neurohypophysial hormones, oxytocin and vasopressin, into the blood.

Damage to the pituitary stalk blocks the release of antidiuretic hormone, resulting in polydipsia (excessive water intake) and polyuria (excessive urination, central diabetes insipidus).

The diameter of the pituitary stalk at the level of optic chiasm is 3.3 mm, and at the pituitary gland insertion site is measured at 1.9 mm.

== See also ==
- Pituitary stalk interruption syndrome

== Additional images ==
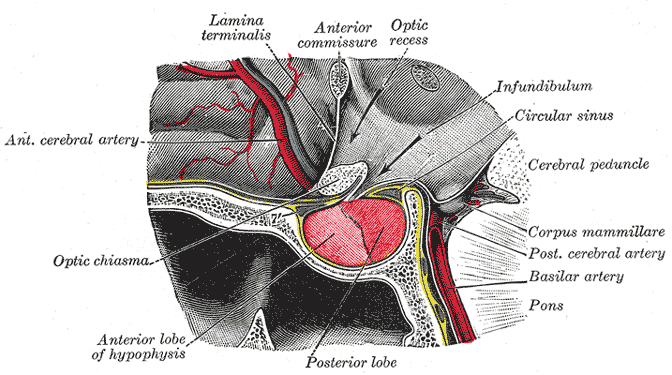
Sagittal section of the pituitary gland, showing the infundibulum
