= Gammel Strand 42 =

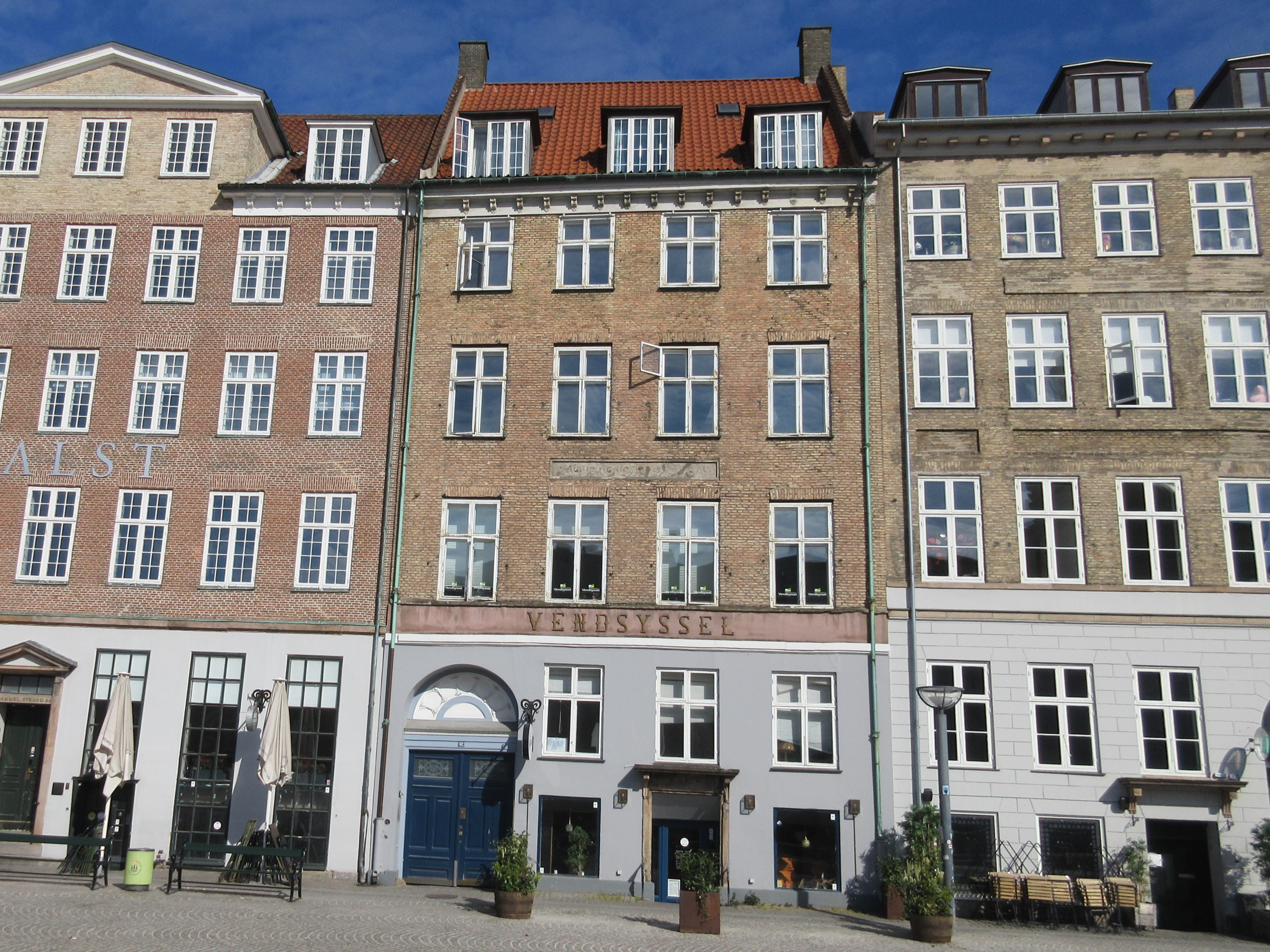

General information
- Location: Copenhagen
- Country: Denmark
- Coordinates: 55°40′39.76″N 12°34′41.66″E
- Completed: 1797
- Renovated: 1855 (heightened); 1930 (wall dormer)

Gammel Strand 42 is a historic property overlooking Slotsholmens Kanal and Slotsholmen in Copenhagen, Denmark. The building was constructed as part of the rebuilding of the city following the Copenhagen Fire of 1795. It listed on the Danish registry of protected buildings and places in 1945. Notable former residents include the surgeon Ludwig Lewin Jacobson, naval officer Lorentz Fjelderup Lassen, jurist F.C. Bornemand (1810–1861) and artists Harald Slott-Møller (1864–1937) and Agnes Slott-Møller.

== History ==
=== 17th and 18th centuries ===
The property belonged to grocer (urtekræmmer) Dirich Strube in the 1650s. On 11 July 1653, he mortgaged it to Ewert Funch (owner of Gammel Strand 40). Strube was later qualified as a pharmacist. On 16 March 1674, the property was sold to furier Peter Røbstrup. His widow was later married to court furier Rudolf Boldevin. His property was listed in Copenhagen's first cadastre of 1689 as No. 12 in Strand Quarter. On 17 June 1693, Boldevin sold the property to royal surgeon Henrich von Soesten. On 3 July 1699, it was by his widow Margrete sold to renteskriver Liebhart Vieth. His widow Anna Margrete Junge owned it until at least 1728.

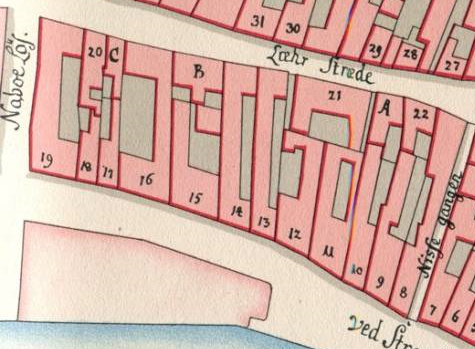
No. 12 seen on a detail from Christian Gedde's map of Strand Quarter, 1756.

The property was again listed as No. 12 in the new cadastre of 1756 and was then owned by Thomas Morville.

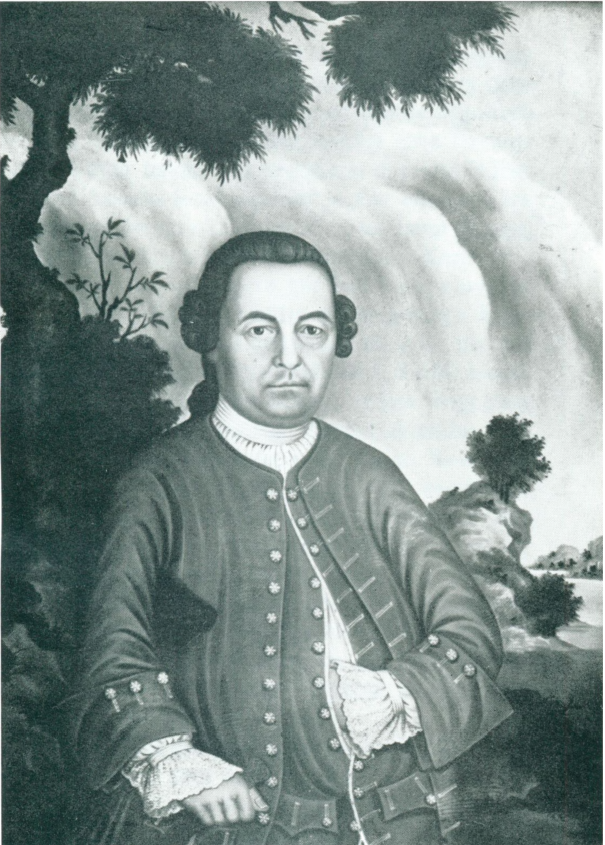
Lars Svane..

In early 1764, N0. 12 was acquired for 7,300 Danish rigsdaler by Johanne Marie Swane (née Harboe). She acted on behalf of her husband, DAC captain Lars Swane, who was in Canton and without any knowledge of her disposition. The couple had recently moved to an apartment at Store Kongensgade No. 44 (now Store Kongensgade 46) after selling their house at Nyhavn 29. In June 1767, Swane bought a parcel of land in Ordrup north of the city. A country house was not built on the land until 1771. In the meantime, Swane had completed his fifth expedition to Canton. In 1772–73, Swane also undertook a comprehensive renovation of his Gammel Strand property. The house was divided into a separate apartment on each of the three upper floors. The side wing was heightened from two to three floors and a new three-storey rear wing was also constructed. The pulley was removed from the front wing's gabled wall dormer. The property was home to four households in 1778. A beer seller resided in the basement. A merchant resided on the ground floor. Swane and a wholesale merchant Galck occupied the two large apartments on the rwo upper floors.

Lars Swane died on 5 March 1781 at Ordrup. Johanne Marie Swane lost her youngest son Emmanuel in 1783. He died just 17 years old as a cadet on board the naval ship Indfødsretten. The daughter Catharina died in labour the following year. The youngest daughter Karen Francisca died just 21 years old in 1784. In 1793, Johanne Marie Swane sold her properties in Copenhagen and Ordrup, bought Torkilstrup Church on Lolland, and settled with her daughter and son-in-law Søren Svendsen Ingemann in Torkilstrup Rectory.

Agent Hans Holck (1726–1783), who created the first city directory for Copenhagen, was among the residents in around 1782.

At the time of the 1787 census, No. 12 was home to four households. Friderich Christian Fries, a naval officer with rank of captain lieutenant, resided in the building without any family or staff. Fridericha Magrethe Sal.Nissen, a 52-year-old widow, resided in another dwelling with her 24-year-old daughter Anne Agathe Nissen, two lodgers, a seamstress, three maids and an 11-year-old orphaned girl that she had adopted. Mette Claussen, widow of a justitsråd, resided in a third dwelling with her 13-year-old daughter Helena Ahemand, her sister Helena Maria Claussen, two maids, a male servant and a lodger. Petr Andersen, a junk dealer, resided in the basement with his wife Anne Chierstine, their two children (aged four and six), his mother Ellen Sørensen and one maid.

=== Saabye and the new building ===
The building was destroyed in the Copenhagen Fire of 1795. The fire came from the east and was stopped a few houses further to the west at the street Naboløs. The present building on the site was constructed in 1799–1800 by master carpenter Christopher Crane for merchant Claus Saabye.

Saabye's property was home to four households at the 1801 census. The 30-year-old owner resided in one of the apartments with his widowed mother Mette Marie Barmeyer, a clerk and a maid. Knud Engelbreth Langberg, a general average adjuster (Dispacheur), resided in the building with his wife Birgitte Marie Jacobsen. Else Langberg (née Jacobsen), a widow, resided in a third apartment with her four children (aged four to 10), two clerks and two maids. Johannes Gregorius Veithm a clerk and later wjolesaler (grosserer), resided in the basement with his wife Ane Cathrine Bergen von, two maids, a fishmonger and his brother, three fishermen, two more maids and two male servants.

=== Salomonsen family ===
The property was listed in the new cadastre of 1806 as No. 11 in Strand Quarter. It was at that time owned by grocer (urtekræmmer) Samuel Moses Salomonsen (1778–1855). He was married to Malchen Henriques (1777–1835). a daughter of Bendix Moses Henriques and a sister of among others Ruben Henriques Jr.

The surgeon Ludwig Lewin Jacobson was among the residents in 1816–18. Counter Admiral Lorentz Fjelderup Lassen lived in the building from 1834 and until his death in 1837. F.C. Bornemand (1810–1861), a professor of law at the University of Copenhagen, was a resident from 1840 to 1843.

The property was home to 10 residents in four households at the time of the 1840 census. Samuel Moses Salomonsenm whose wife had died in 1835, resided on the grounde floor with his housekeeper Sara Gottschalk, one maid, three employees and a caretaker. Moritz Salomonsen resided alone on the first floor. Peder Jacobsen Tetens, a landvæsenskommissær and judge in Hof- og Stadsretten, resided on the second floor with his wife Sofie Tetens (née Tetens) and one maid. Fredrik Christian Bornemann, a jurist at the University of Copenhagen, resided on the third floor with his wife Marie Bornemann (née Engelstoft) and one maid. The Supreme Court attorney C. E. Rotwitt (1812–1860) resided in one of the apartments in 1844–1845.

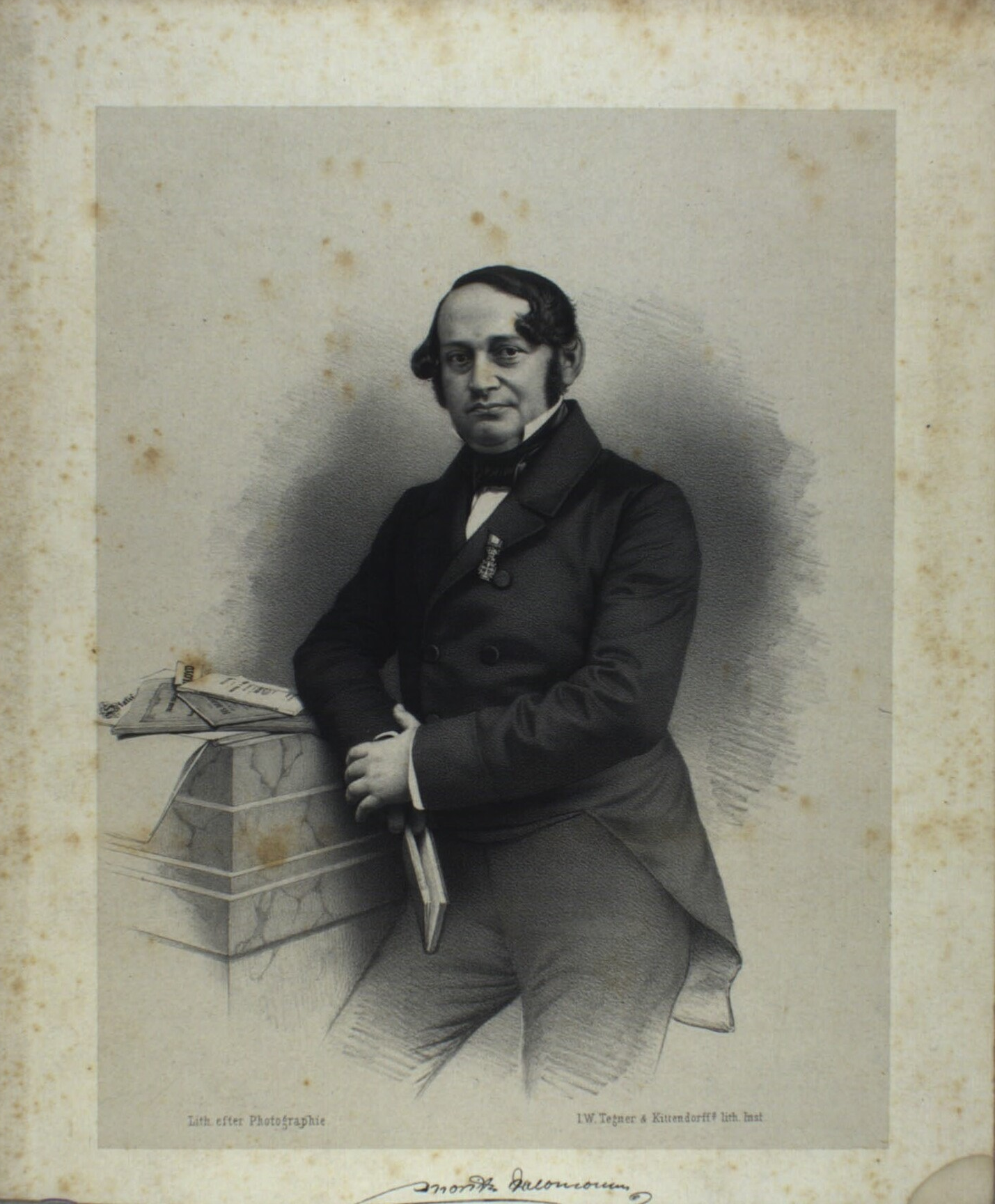
Moritz Samuel Salomonsen

The property was home to 20 residents in three households at the time of the 1845 census. Samuel M. Salomonsen shared the two lower floors with his son Moritz Salomonsen and daughter-in-law Frederikke Salomonsen (née Abrahamsen), their one-year-old son Emil Salomonsen, two housekeepers (husjomfruer), four employee's in the family's wholesale business, two male servants and three maids. Peter Tetens (1797–1859), a landvæsenskommissær), resided on the second floor with his wife Sophie Tetens, Sophie Tetens and one maid. Edvard Garriques, a merchant, resided on the third floor with his housekeeper Emilie Skibsted.

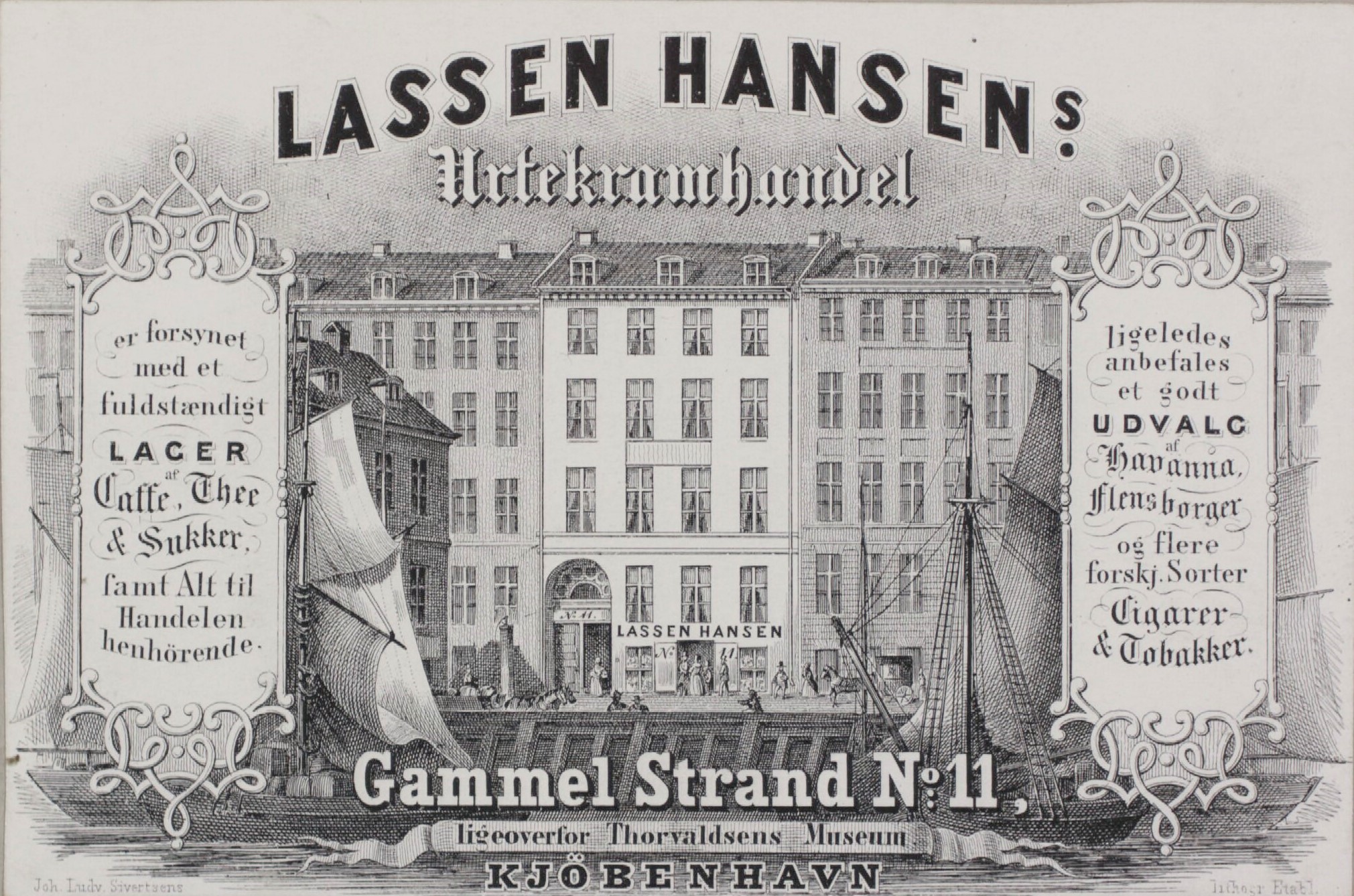
Advert for Lassen Hansen's grocer's shop

Gammel Strand 42 was home to 21 residents at the time of the 1860 census.Martin Salomonsen (1814–1889), a medical doctor, resided on the second floor with his wife Emma Salomonsen (née Henriques), their 13-year old son Carl Julius Salomonsen and two maids. Emilie Henriques (née Halle), a 55-year-old widow, resided on the first floor with her 31-year-old son Ludvig Emil Henriques and one maid. The 64-year-old Eduard Garriques still resided in the third floor apartment with his wife Octavia Carriques (née Lassen) and one maid. Mathias Wolff, a businessman (vare- og vekselmægler), resided on the ground floor with his wife Andrea Wolff (née Collstrup), their two sons (aged one and two) and two maids. Larsen Hansen, a grocer (urtekræmmer), resided in the basement with one apprentice and one maid.

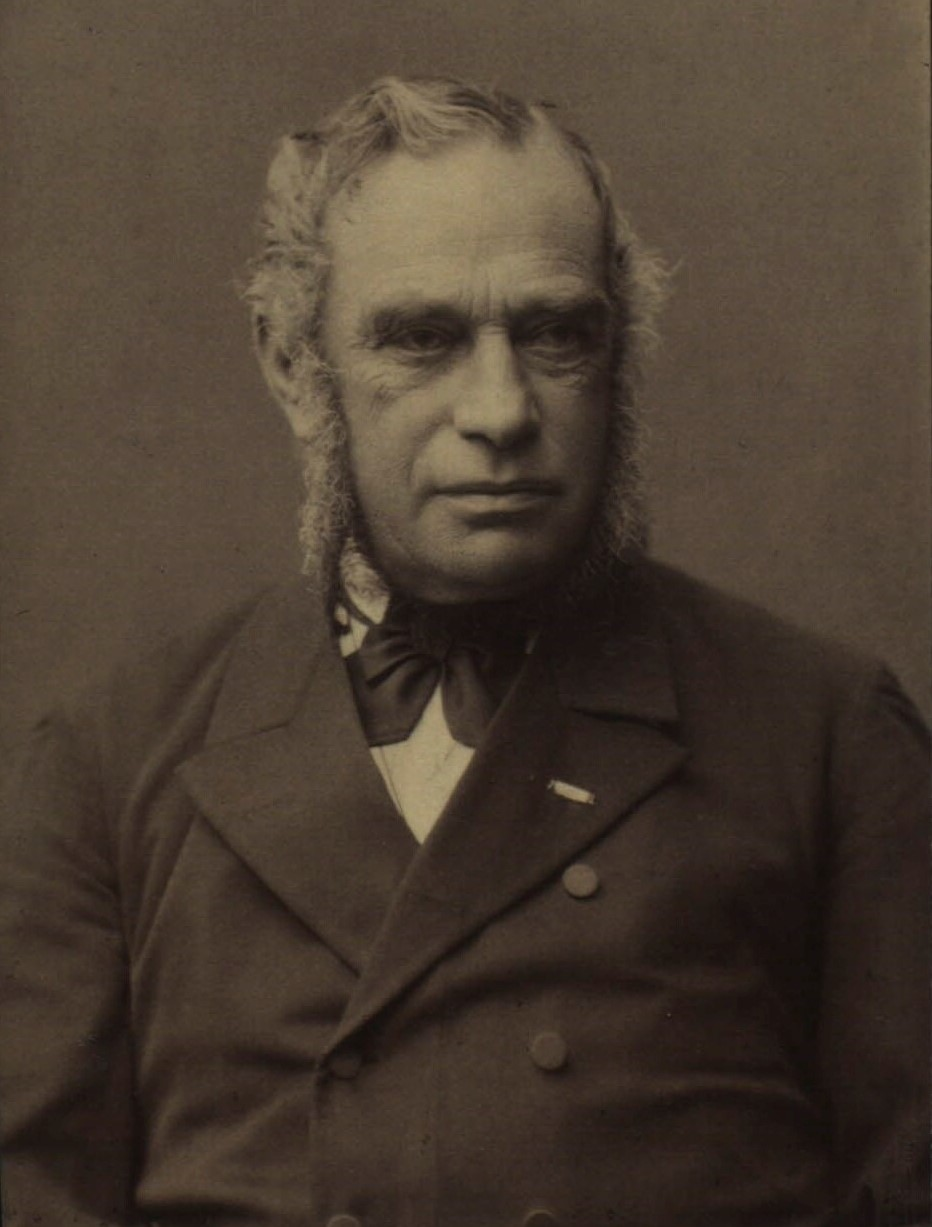
Martin Salomonsen

Martin Salomonsen still resided in one of the apartments in 1880. His son Carl Julius Salomonsen resided in another apartment with his wife Christian Ferdinand Nielsen. Lassen Hansen was still occupying the ground floor of the building. Frans Johannes Martins, a merchant (grosserer), resided in the fourth apartment with his wife Petra Ricarda Svendstrup and their two-year-old daughter.

=== 20th century ===
The building was acquired by Kristian Mikkelsen Vendsyssel in 1900. He had established his own fish wholesale business in Hjørring in 1887 but later moved the operation first to Frederikshavn and then in 1895 to Copenhagen. On 30 October 1898, together with Seattle-based Theodor Wilhelm Hansen (died 1916) and Frederikshavn-based Peder Morthensen Asp (died 1917), he had started a new venture, Vendsyssel Packing Co, which was involved in the salting of salmon on the American west coast for sale on the European markets. The company was still based in the building in 1950.

The painters Harald Slott-Møller (1864–1937) and Agnes Slott-Møller lived in one of the apartments in the years around 1908.

== Architecture ==
Gammel Strand 42 is a just four bays wide building constructed with four storeys over a walk-out basement. The facade of the ground floor and the exposed part of the basement is plastered and painted grey while the upper floors are in undressed, red masonry. A side wing extends from the rear of building and connects to a rear wing at the bottom of a narrow courtyard.

== Today ==
In 2012 the property was purchased by a family trust created by Klaus Riskær Petersen.
