= Flehmen response =

Behavior in which an animal curls back its upper lip exposing its front teeth

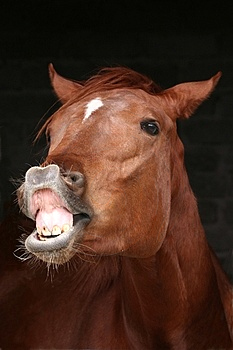
Flehmen response in a horse

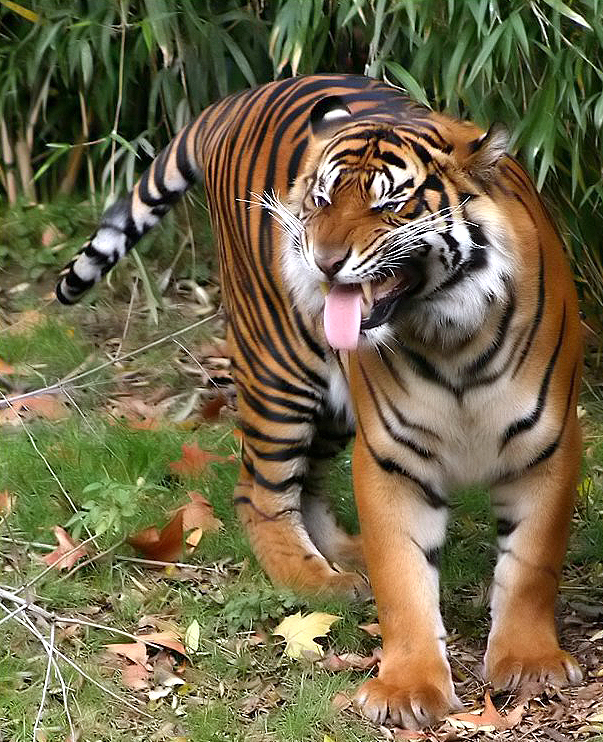
Flehmen response in a Sumatran tiger

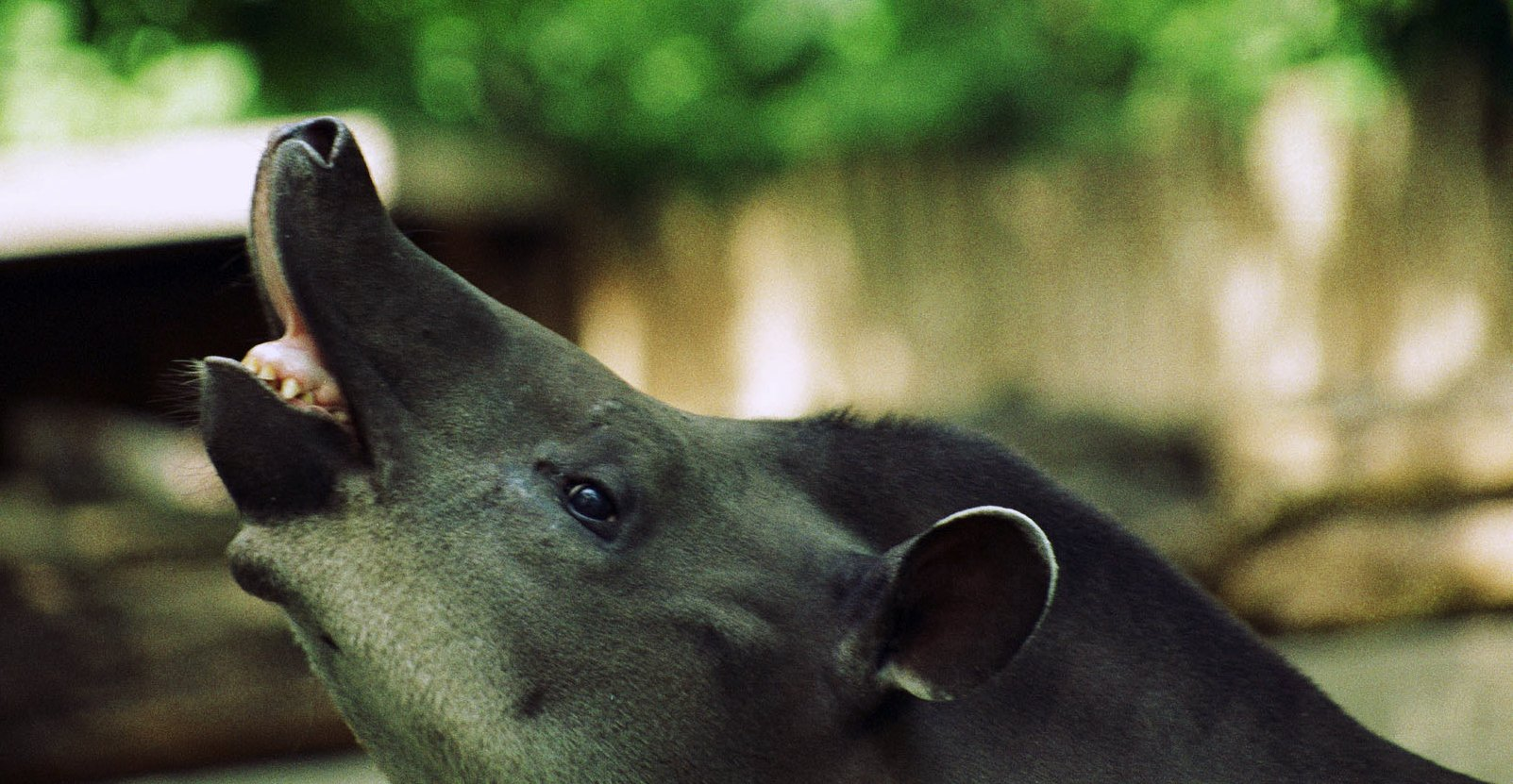
Flehmen response in a tapir

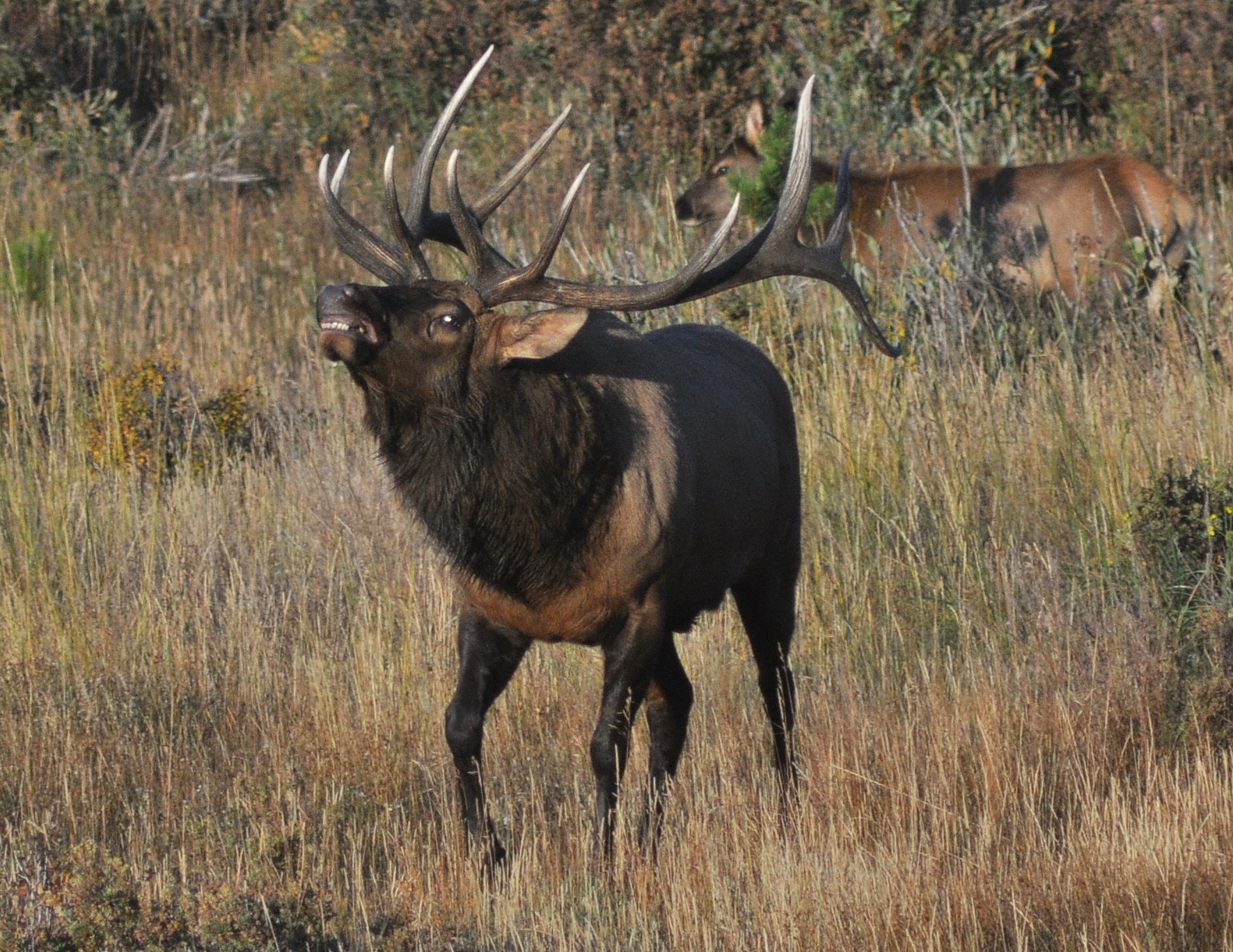
Flehmen response in an elk

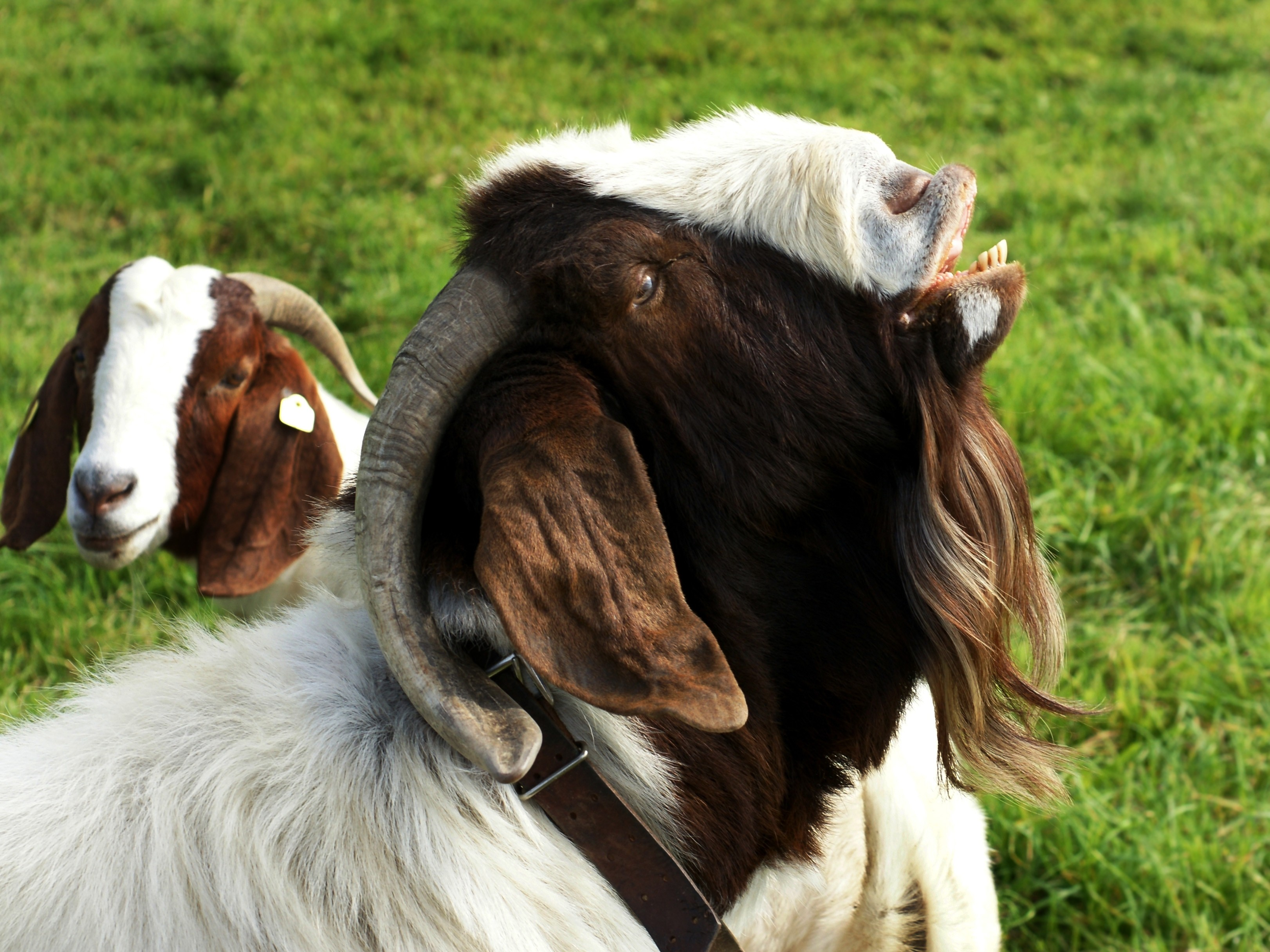
Flehmen response in a goat

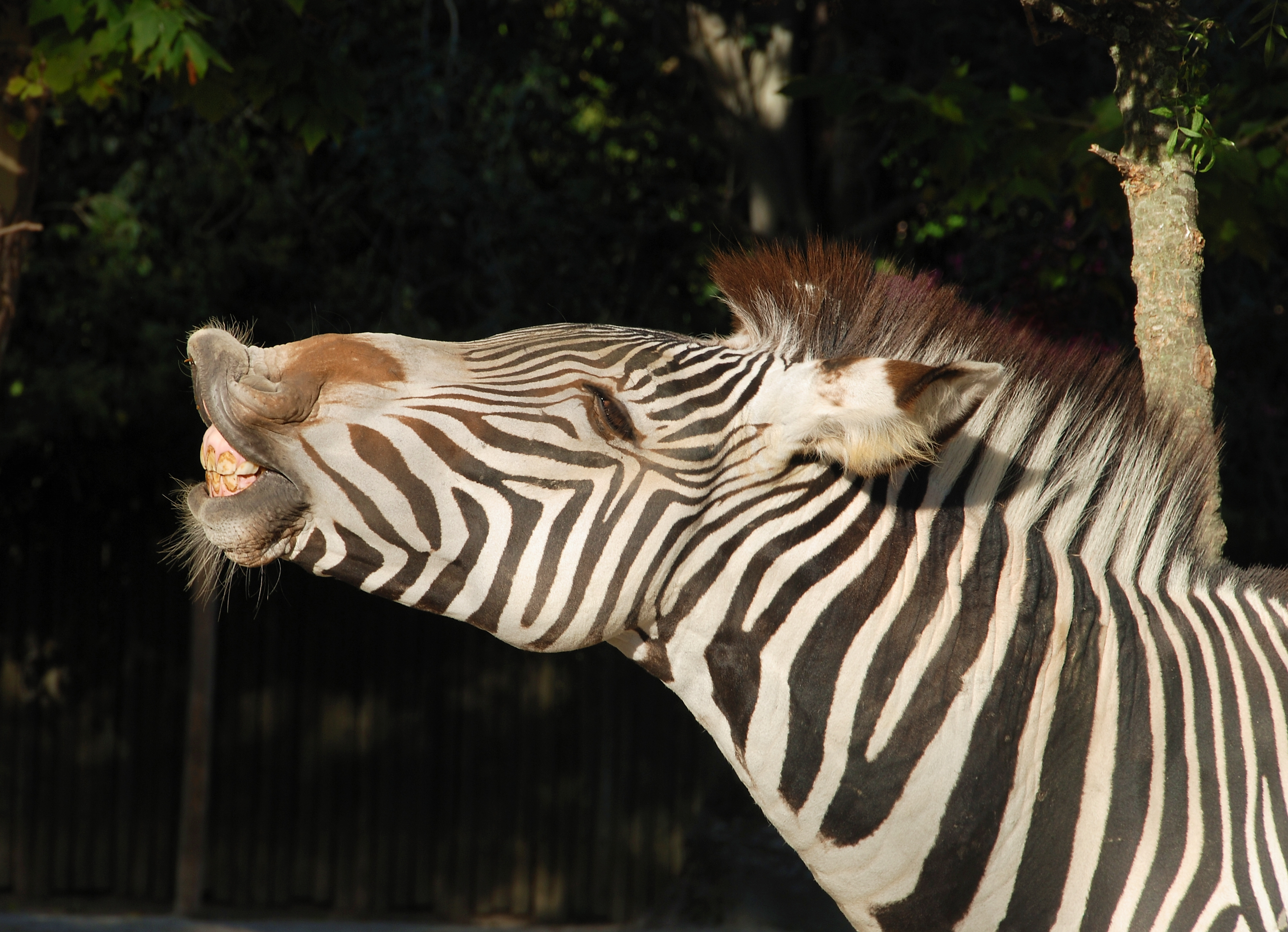
Flehmen response in a zebra

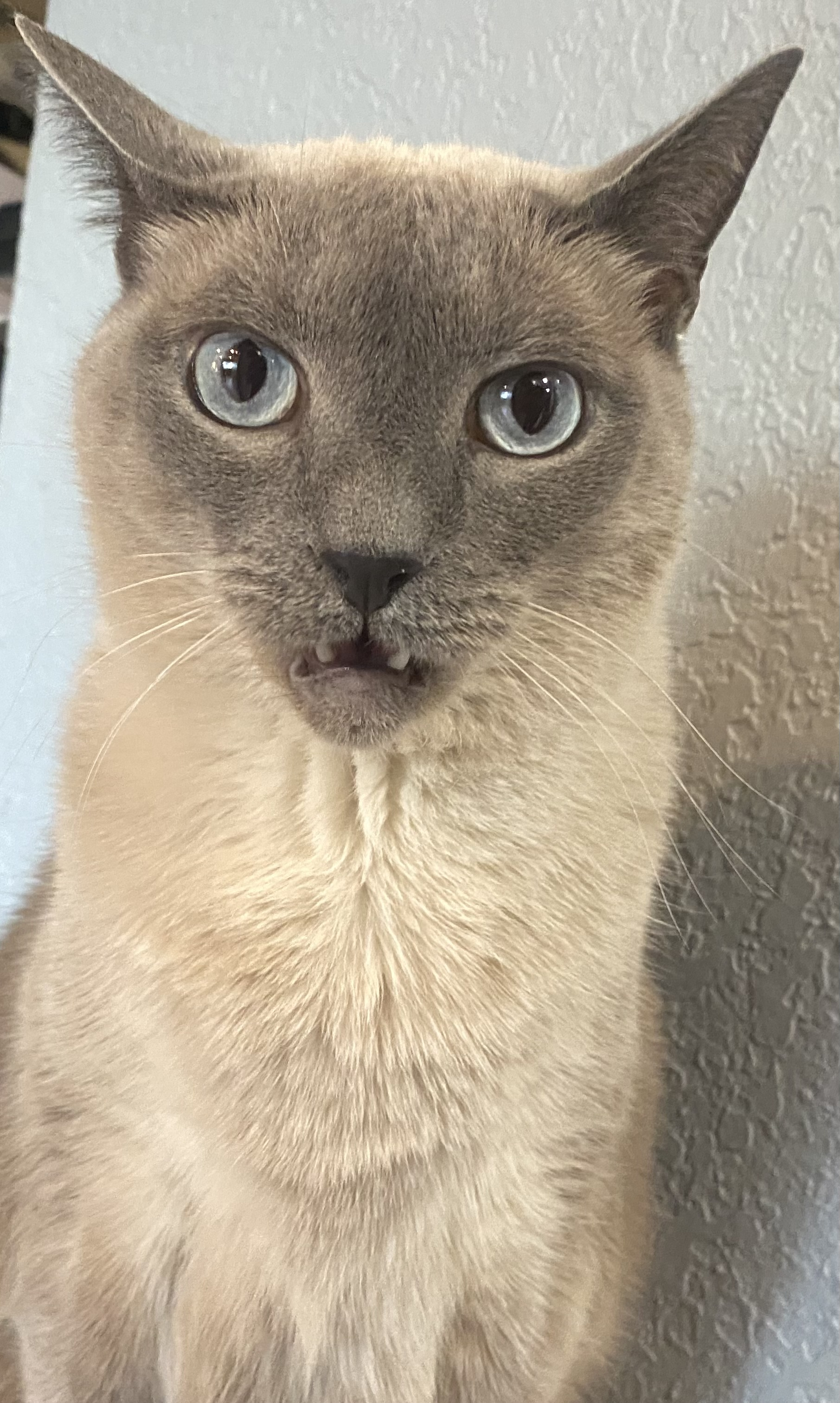
Flehmen response in a cat

The flehmen response (/ˈfleɪmən/; from German flehmen 'to bare the upper teeth', and Upper Saxon German flemmen 'to look spiteful'), also called the flehmen position, flehmen reaction, flehmen grimace, flehming, or flehmening, is a behavior in which an animal curls back its upper lip exposing its front teeth, inhales with the nostrils usually closed, and then often holds this position for several seconds. The behavior occurs as a response to relevant external stimuli, typically pheromones, which may have been produced by animals of the same or different species. It may be performed with the neck stretched and the head held high in the air.

Flehmen is performed by a wide range of mammals, including ungulates and felids. The behavior facilitates the transfer of pheromones and other scents into the vomeronasal organ (VNO, or Jacobson's organ) located above the roof of the mouth via a duct which exits just behind the front teeth of the animal.

== Etymology ==
The word is loaned from the German verb flehmen 'to bare the upper teeth', which itself is derived from the Upper Saxon German flemmen 'to look spiteful'. The word was introduced in 1930 by Karl Max Schneider, director of the Leipzig zoo and an authority on big cats in captivity.

== Discovery ==
The flehmen response was first described by Frederik Ruysch in 1732 and described later by Ludwig Jacobson in 1813.

== Description ==
This response is characterized by the animal curling back its top lip exposing the front teeth and gums, then inhaling and holding the posture for several seconds. The behavior may be performed over particular locations, in which case the animal may also lick the site of interest, or may perform the flehmen with the neck stretched and head held high in the air for a more general gustatory or taste-related investigation. The flehmen response can give the appearance that the animal is looking spiteful, grimacing, smirking, disgusted, or laughing. The relationship between emotions and expressions across species is debated.

== Mechanism ==
The flehmen response draws air into the vomeronasal organ (VNO), an auxiliary olfactory sense organ that is found in many animals. This organ plays a role in the perception of certain scents and pheromones. The vomeronasal organ is named for its closeness to the vomer and nasal bones, and is particularly well developed in animals such as cats and horses. The VNO is found encompassed inside a bony or cartilaginous capsule which opens into the base of the nasal cavity. Animals that exhibit flehmen have a papilla located behind the incisors and ducts which connect the oral cavity to the VNO, with horses being an exception. Horses exhibit flehmen but do not have an incisive duct communication between the nasal and oral cavity because they do not breathe through their mouths; instead, the VNOs connect to the nasal passages by the nasopalatine duct.

=== Chemical cues ===
The chemical cue obtained by an animal exhibiting the flehmen response is the presence of a non-volatile organic compound. In contrast to volatile organic compounds (VOCs), non-volatile organic compounds are those carbon compounds that do not participate in atmospheric photochemical reactions or evaporate under normal atmospheric conditions. The VNO detects non-VOCs, which must have direct contact with the odor source. Sources of non-VOCs relevant to the flehmen response include pheromones and hormones excreted from the genital regions or urine of animals.

== Function ==
An animal may perform the flehmen response when investigating sites of particular interest, or perhaps (more generally) odors or flavours. In horses, spontaneous flehmen response outside of the normal context can also indicate discomfort.

=== Intra-species communication ===
The primary function of the flehmen response is intra-species communication. By transferring air containing pheromones and other scents to the VNO, animals can gather chemical "messages". These scents tell an animal about other members of their species in some of the following ways:

- Identifying reproductive status – male individuals commonly use the flehmen response as an olfactory mechanism for identifying the reproductive state of females of the same species based on pheromones in the female's urine or genitals. This is exhibited in the reproductive behavior of sheep. The ram often exhibits flehmen after sniffing ewes' external genital regions, but this occurs most frequently on the day before estrus when the ewes are sexually receptive.
- Reproductive synchrony – flehmen behavior also plays a role in reproductive synchrony between females. In the sable antelope, the frequency of flehmen changes seasonally, with the highest levels just prior to conception. Female antelopes associate closely with other females in the same reproductive state. Flehmen rates between females anticipated birth synchrony. Additionally, the level of synchrony was predicted by the frequency of female urine sampling during the previous year. Flehmen is a mechanism used by female sable antelopes to manipulate the timing of both conception and birth of offspring. In the American bison, flehmen behavior in females has also been shown to stimulate the onset of estrus and copulation synchronization.
- Post-parturition – in horses, mares commonly show a peak in flehmen response during the first few hours after giving birth. Smelling the newborn foal and the amniotic fluids associated with birth often produces the reaction.
- Immature animals – in young horses, both colts (males) and fillies (females) exhibit flehmen behavior toward other conspecifics with neither sex performing the behavior more than the other. However, it has been reported that young colts flehmen up to five times more frequently than fillies, and fillies flehmen more frequently than mature mares. Young elephants also have a flehmen response to stimulants. The VNO of newborn elephants displays a structural maturity similar to adults, which supports the conclusion that flehmen at only six weeks of age is used to deliver chemical pheromones to a functional VNO.

=== Inter-species communication ===
The flehmen response is not limited to intra-species communication. Goats have been tested for their flehmen response to urine from 20 different species, including several non-mammalian species. This study suggests there is a common element in the urine of all animals, an interspecific pheromone, which elicits flehmen behavior. Specifically, chemical pheromone levels of a modified form of androgen, a sex hormone, were associated with the response in goats.

== Mammals exhibiting ==
A wide range of mammals exhibit flehmen including both predatory and non-predatory species.

The response is perhaps most easily observed in domestic cats and horses; both exhibit a strong flehmen response to odors. Stallions usually smell the urine of mares in estrus whereas the male giraffe's flehmen response includes tasting the female's urine. Elephants perform a flehmen response but also transfer chemosensory stimuli to the vomeronasal opening in the roof of their mouths using the prehensile structure, sometimes called a "finger", at the tips of their trunks.

Other animals which exhibit the flehmen response include sheep, American bison, tigers, tapirs, lions, giraffes, goats, llamas, kobs, hedgehogs, rhinoceros, giant pandas, antelope and hippopotamuses.
