= Gammel Strand 44 =

Building in Copenhagen

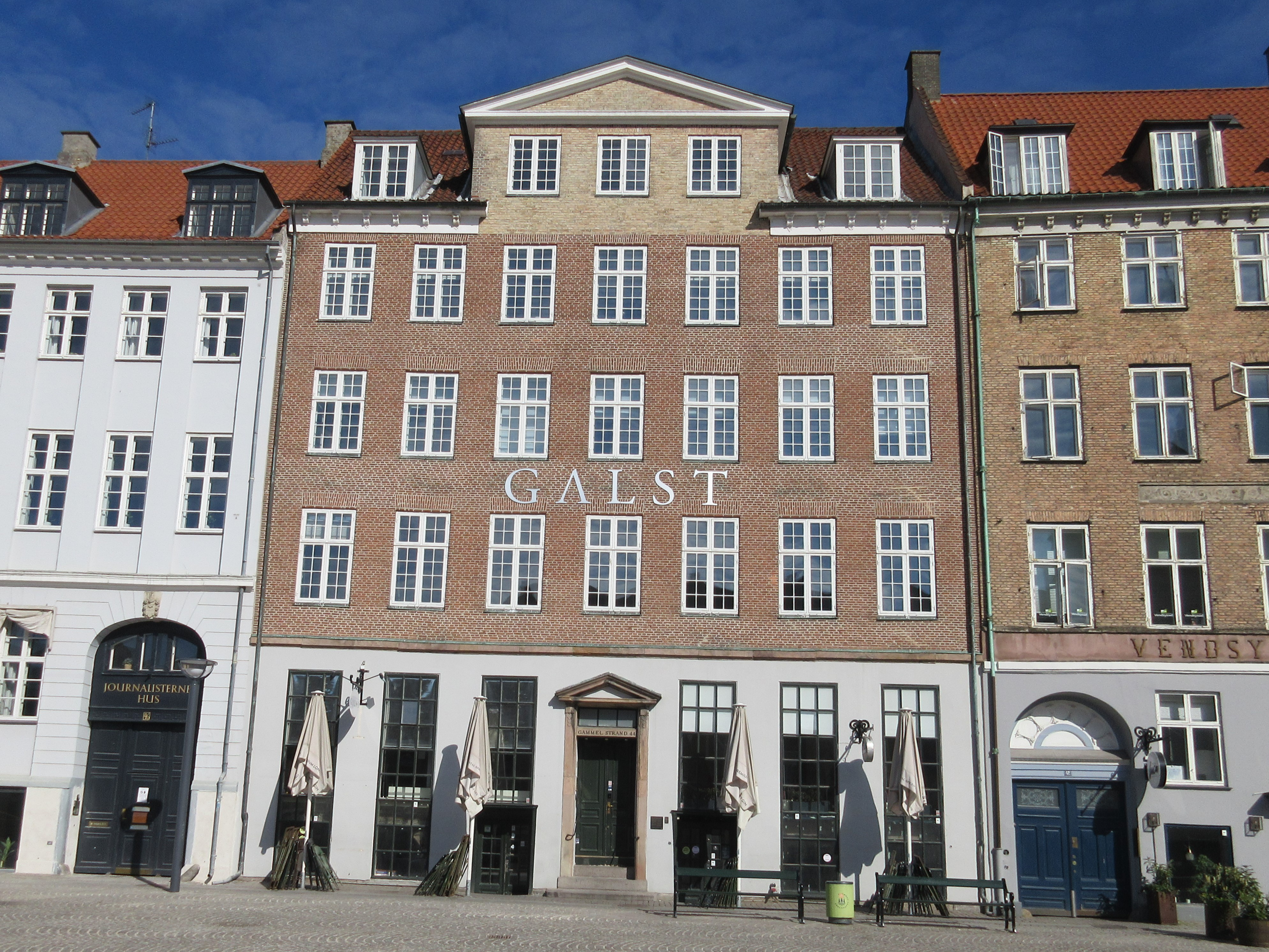
- Interactive map of the Gammel Strand 44 area

General information
- Location: Copenhagen, Denmark
- Coordinates: 55°40′39.58″N 12°34′40.99″E
- Completed: 1797
- Renovated: 1855 (heightened); 1930 (wall dormer)

Gammel Strand 44 is a historic property overlooking Slotsholmens Kanal and Slotsholmen in the Old Town of Copenhagen, Denmark. The building was listed in the Danish registry of protected buildings and places in 1945. Notable former residents include ballet masters Antoine Bournonville and August Bournonville, physicist Hans Christian Ørsted and composer Friedrich Ludwig Æmilius Kunzen.

== History ==
=== 18th century ===
The site was prior to the construction of the Copenhagen Fire of 1795 made up of two narrow properties.

The eastern of the two properties was the site of a house constructed by the crown in 1619, Giert Albretsen Frølich was for many years the tenant of the building. By council ruling (Borgmester- og Raads Dom) of 26 August 1646, it was ceded to Dr. Hans Resen. On 21 June 1647, it was appaeantly ceded to Jacob Kesnich. On 4 March 1650, it was sold to renteskriver Jørgen Hansen. On 14 June 1686, it was sold by his widow to royal tailor Johan (Jochum) Schumacher. His property was listed in Copenhagen's first cadastre of 1689 as No. 13 in Strand Quarter. In 1802, it was owned by Icelandic merchant Laurs Bertelsen. On 18 September 1715, his widow ceded it to their son-in-law Claus Halle. In 1718, it was sold at auction to Joseph Meyer Levin (deed issued on 8 July). He owned it until at least 1728.

The western property belonged to Willum Habersach in October 1609. On 1 May 1620, it belonged to renteskriver and later councilman Anders Olufsen. His widow Karen Clausdatter kept the property after his death in December 1733. On 21 August 1643, she sold it to mayor Christoffer Hansen (died December 1679). On 26 September 1681, his heirs sold it to vintner Niels Christensen Hassel. On 29 June 1685, he sold it to secretary in the German Chancellery Frands von Hagen. His property was listed in the Cadastre of 1689 as No. 14 in Strand Quarter. On 29 December 1702, he sold it to secretary in German Shancellery Friederich Esmarch. He owned it until at least 1728.

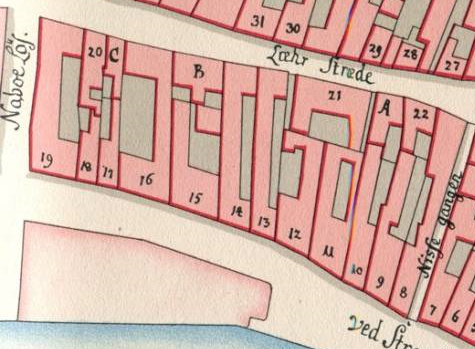
No. 13 and No. 14 seen on a detail from Christian Gedde's map of Strand Quarter, 1756

The eastern property was again listed as No. 13 in the new cadastre of 1756 and was at that time owned by Amsel Jaob Meyer (1728-98). He was married rquce, first to his cousin Brendel Meyer (Hausen, died c. 1763) and secondly to his niece Hizl. He was in his first marriage the father of later businessman David Amsel Meyer (1755-1813), Hitzelia Leidesdorff (married to merchant and head of the Jewish congregation in Altona Nathan Levin Leidesdorff) and Salomon Amsel Meyer (1759-1795). The western property was again listed as No. 14 and belonged to a man named Esmark.

The two properties were both destroyed in the Copenhagen Fire of 1795, together with most of the other buildings in the area. The present building on the site was constructed in 1797 by master builder Frederik C. G. Koop.

=== 1800–1840 ===
The property was home to nine households at the 1801 census. Herman Richter, a merchnat, resided in the building with his wife Betty Dorothea Bernhardt, their two children (aged one and two) and one maid. Hans Jørgensen, a hearse coachman, resided in the building with his wife Bodil Sophie Nielsdatter. Wulf Jacob Berns, a hosier (hosekræmmer), resided in the building with his wife Birthe Goldsmith, their three children (aged four to eight) and 17-year-old Nathan Nathan. Jacob Albert Meyer, a merchant, resided in the building with his f9ve children (aged nine to 17) and two maids. Anne Elisabeth Nielsdatter, a widow with a pension, resided in the building with her two children (aged one and four). Ane Margrethe Ankersen, a widow, resided in the building with her daughter Else Ankersen and two maids as well as the widow Judita Hamar, her five children and one maid. Philip Seydler, a court musician, resided in the building with his wife Augusta Tiemroth, their three children (aged one to three) and two maids. Didrich Didrichsen, secretary of the Rotal Danish Agricultural Society, resided in the building with his wife Severine Marie Hallesenm their six children (aged 13 to 20) and one maid. Sigvart Colbiørnsen German, a senior ckerj, resided in the building with his wife Adel Benedicta Schiøtt and one maid. Jens Christian Worskou, a beer seller (øltapper), resided in the building with his wife Ide Margrethe Bukholtm their one-year-old son and one maid. Niels Jørgen Smith, a barkeeper, resided in the building with his wife Mette Marie Ingerslef, their four children (aged four to 14) and one maid.

The property was listed as No. 12 in the new cadastre of 1806. It was at that time owned by merchant Simon Jacob.

First solo dancer and later ballet master at the Royal Danish Ballet Antoine Bournonville was a resident of the building in 1811. His son, August Bournonville, who would later also become ballet master, was then around six years old. The physicist Hans Christian Ørsted was also a resident of the building in 1811.

The wholesale merchant (grosserer) Niels Adler resided in the building in 1812. He lived there with his wife Anne Charlotte Kristine Adler (née Engel, 1789-1871 ), Their wedding took place 2on 21 June 1811.

Composer F.L.Æ. Kunzen had his last home in the building from 1814 to 1817. C. L. Sander (1756-1819), a professor at the University of Copenhagen, was a resident from 1818 and until his death the following year.

=== Salomon family ===
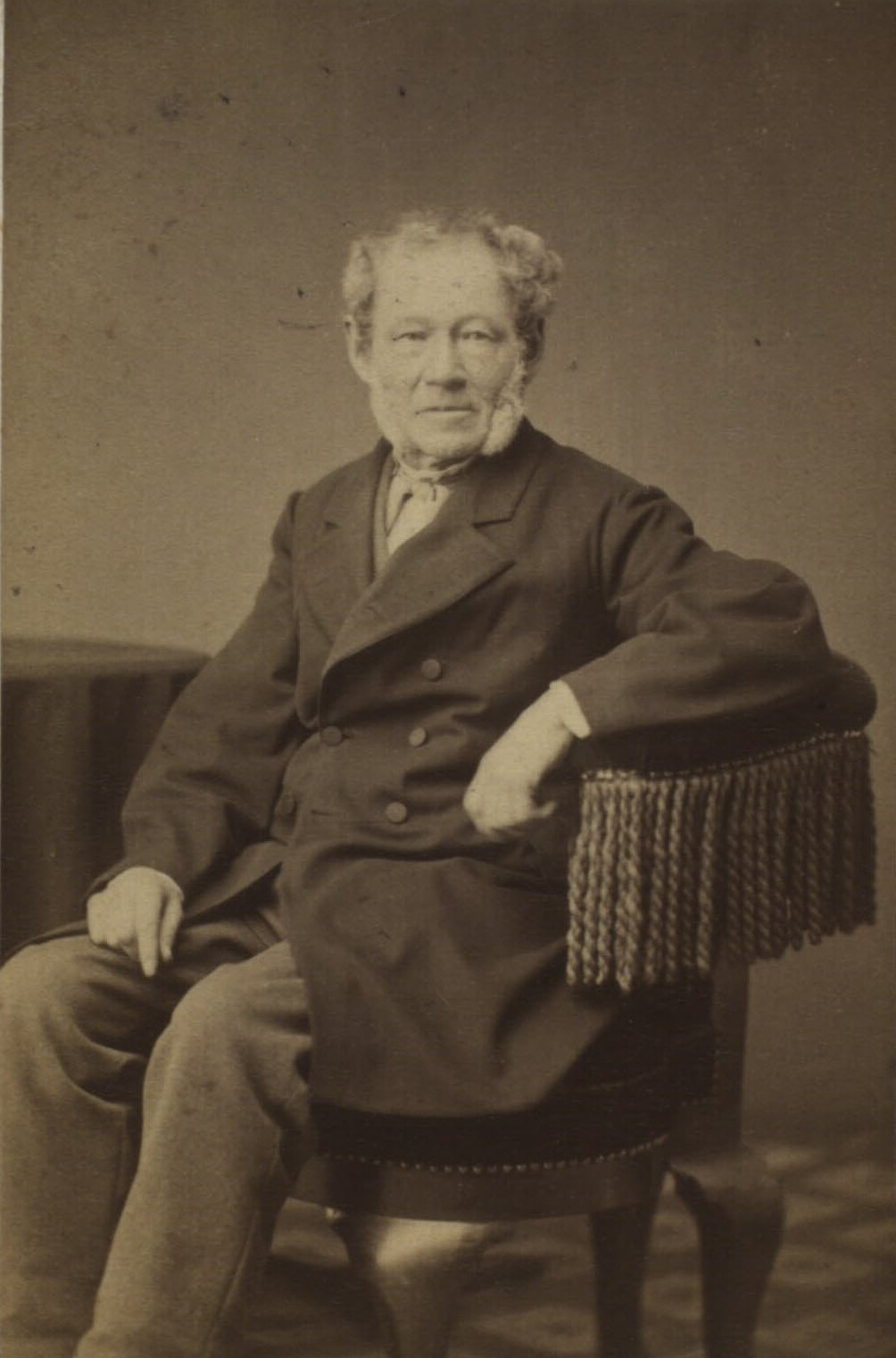
Amsel Gottschalk Salomon.

Amsel Gottschalk Salomon (1802-1878) opened a bookshop in the building in 1820. He was the son of merchant Gottschalk Salomon (c. 1775-1843) and Brendle Haussen (c. 1775-1836). His mother was a daughter of the above mentioned former owner of the property Amsel Jacob Meyer (Hausen) by his second wife Hizl. She was first time married to her relative Salomon Abraham Meyer, a broker (mægler), with whom she had the son Ernst Meyer. Their marriage was dissolved in 1798.

At the time of the 1840 census, No. 12 was home to 10 households. Amsel Gottschalk Salomon resided on the ground floor with his wife Anna Salomon (née Weilbye), their five children (aged two to 12) and one maid. Carl Frederik de Fine Skibsted (1812-1881), a royal assessor in the Admiralty, resided in the other ground floor apartment with his wife Marie Josephine Denise Mourier (1814-1861), their one-year-old son Charles Arnold de Fine Skibsted, a nanny and a maid. Hartvig G. Sonderberg, a senior clerk in the International Customs Office, resided on the first floor with his wife Bodil L. Lohmann, their five children (aged four to 15) and one maid. Sophie E. W. Jessen (née Møller), a widow, resided in the other first floor apartment with her 36-year-old daughter Caroline W. Jessen and one maid. Ole Chr. Borgen, a bookkeeper, resided on the second floor with his wife Charlotte M. Borgen (née Borgen), their three children (aged one to five) and two maids. Sophie T. Kraft, a widow, resided in the other second floor apartment with her three children (aged 16 to 21) and one maid. Henriette Schonheyder (née Kønemann, 1783-1758), widow of birk judge at Gavnø Morten Schmidt Schønheyder (1792-1835), resided on the third floor with her four children (aged 13 to 23) and one maid. Johan F. Gradman, a clerk at the Admiralty, resided in the other third floor apartment with his wife Louise Lassen, their one-year-old son, four lodgers, a nanny and a maid. Christensen Bøgeskov, the proprietor of a tavern in the basement, resided in the associated dwelling with his wife Stine født Marfeldt and their six children (aged seven to 19). Caroline Evald, a fashion retailer, was also residing in the basement.

At the time of the 1845 census, No. 12 was home to 69 residents in nine households. Ansel and Anna Salomon were still resident on the ground floor with their now six children (aged two to 18) and one maid. Salomon Monies, a tobacco manufacturer, resided in the other ground floor apartment with his wife Frederike Monies (née Soldin), four of their children (aged 24 to 29) and one maid. Sophie Ernestine Wilhelmine Jessen were still residing in one of the first floor apartments with her daughter and one maid. Petrea Sophie Juul, a widow supported economically by family members, resided in the other first floor apartment with her two children (aged 11 and 13), 26-year-old Petrine Wilhelmine Petersen and one maid. Lauritz Stephan Borring, a professor of French at the Army Cadet Academy, resided on the second floor with his wife Christiane Borring (née Bülow), their eight children (aged two to 21), three lodgers, one male servant and three maids. Maria Telens (née Bramsen), a 35-year-old widow with a pension, resided on the third floor with the 38-year-old unmarried woman Lisette Trænkel, 31-year-old Wilhelmine Bramsen, Bramsen's three children (aged eight to 11) and one maid. Maria Elisabeth Luplau født Bernburg, a 41-year-old widow, resided in the other third floor apartment with her five children (aged 10 to 15), one maid and one lodger. Hans Christian Christensen, a new proprietor of the tavern in the basement, resided in the associated dwelling with his wife Christine Chatrine Christensen and their four children (aged 11 to 22). Julius Michaelsen, a merchant, resided in the other half of the basement with his wife Rikke Michaelsen født Rotschild, their four children (aged 18 to 22) and one maid.

At the time of the 1860 census, No. 12 was home to 53 residents in nine households. Amsel Gottschalk Salomonsen still resided with his wife and two of his daughters in the ground floor apartment to the right. Jacob Christian Borreby, a junk dealer, resided on the ground floor to the left with his wife Ane Larsine f. Jukumsen, their two daughters (aged 14 and 27), one maid and one lodger. Hertvig Samuel Levin, a broker (vekselmægler), resided on the ground floor with his wife Hanne Levin (née Ischarel) and one maid. Carl Ferdinand Wessel Brown, a teacher in mathematics and physics at the Agricultural Academy, resided on the first floor to the right with his wife Mette Charlotte Wessel Brown (née Skeel) and one maid. Peder Knudsen Hansen, a businessman (mægler) and lieutenant in the Civil Gyard, resided on the first floor to the left with his wife Cæcilie Kristiane Hansen (née Rosberg), their two children (aged three and five), a 30-year-old office clerk and one maid. Cosman Levysohn, a textile merchant, resided on the second floor to the right with his wife Henriette Levysohn f. Eschel, a 31-year-old unmarried daughter and one maid. Frederik Christian Gebhard Kell, a hotelier, resided in the second floor apartment to the left with his wife Boline Christiane Kell (née Jensen), his sister Caroline Amalie Mathisen, one maid, the businessman (grosserer) Bernhard Lipman Marcus, Marcus' wife Doris Marcus (née Wolff), their five childewn (aged one to 11) and two maids. Jens August Edvard Thanning, a broker (vekselmægler), resided on the third floor to the right with his wife Thora Emilie Thanning (née Møller), their two children (aged nine and 12) and one maid. Lars Olsen, the proprietor of the tavern in the basement, resided in the associated dwelling with his wife Karen Olsen f. Nielsen, their three children (aged five to 13) and one maid.

=== Later history ===
A. Nielsen (1837-1893) opened a fishmonger on the ground floor in 1886 . It was after his death continued by his son Andreas Nielsen (born 1873) until at least the 1950s.

== Architecture ==
Gammel Strand is a four-winged complex. The facade is seven bays wide and has a dressed ground floor while the upper floors stand in blank, red brick. The top floor was added in 1855 while the three-bay wall dormer is from 1930. The main entrance is topped by a triangular pediment.

== Today ==
The Birds CPH, a bar specializing in beer and gin, is based in the ground floor. Other tenants in the building include the law firm Galst Advokater.

== See also ==
- Gammel Strand 42
