= Gingival hirsutism =

Rare medical condition

Gingival hirsutism, also known as oral hypertrichosis, is an exceptionally rare condition in which the gums (gingiva) suffer from abnormal hair growth (hirsutism). Hirsutism in other areas of the body is well researched and quantified with the Ferriman–Gallwey score in over 19 separate areas in the body; however Gingival Hirsutism has only been observed in six known cases. Observed cases have often shown a single hair growth in the mouth, gums, and even the tongue. Interestingly, 5 of the 6 documented cases were male patients.

The most notable case is one involving an anonymous woman who was diagnosed with polyendocrine metabolic ovarian syndrome (PMOS). In 2009 this patient was described by the University of Campania Luigi Vanvitelli as having "hairs on the sulcular epithelium of the retroincisor palatal papilla." The patient was discovered to have high levels of testosterone and luteinizing hormone - as well as cysts in the patient's ovaries. The patient underwent topical surgery to remove the hairs and soft tissue, prescribed an oral contraceptive, and treatment from an endocrinologist. After 4 months of this regimen, the patient reported no issues with the hair returning. The patient returned 6 years later, complaining of the return of the gingival hairs. The patient was now 25 years old, and denied any use of drugs, including the ones prescribed by the endocrinologist. Hairs were seen on the chin and face, as well as hair similar to eyelashes in the Gingival Sulcus. The hairs were removed and microscopic study showed "a fragment of gingival mucosa characterized by slight hypertrophy of the squamous epithelium. The sample was examined through multiple serial sections. In one section, a hair was observed in the gingival stroma." The patient was referred to endocrinologists, returning after a year to show more hairs in the "sulcus between the free gingiva and many teeth, including the maxillary and mandibular incisors and premolars".
