= Karl Max Schneider =

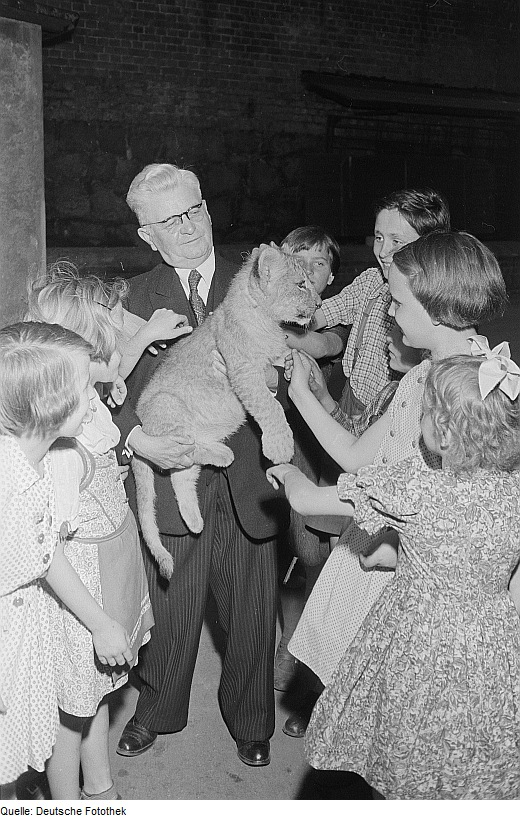
Schneider with a lion cub, interacting with children

Karl Max Schneider (13 March 1887 – 26 October 1955) was an East German zoologist who served as director for the Leipzig Zoo from 1934 till his death. He was an expert on lions and their biology and was responsible for coining the behavioural term "flehmen".

== Biography ==
Schneider was born in Callenberg, Lichtenstein, one of six siblings in a merchant family. He studied in his hometown and then at Waldenberg where he became a teacher from 1908 working in Meerane. In 1912 he received an Abitur from the Realgymnasium Freiberg and a degree in science in 1910 from the University of Leipzig. In 1913 he wrote a thesis on the philosophy of Heinrich Rickert's transcendentalism, but due to the onset of World War I he received a doctorate only in 1918. During the war he was drafted into the front line and was injured in the lower left leg, leading to its amputation. After the war he became an assistant in zoology at Frankfurt University. In 1919 he moved to Leipzig and worked at the university and as an assistant in the Leipzig Zoo from 1920. In 1934 he became director of the Leipzig Zoo where he took a special interest in the breeding behaviour of big cats, particularly lions. He coined the word flehmen in 1930 for the characteristic displays of big cats and several other mammals. The zoo was very successful in captive breeding and even exported lions to Africa. He wrote extensively and was popular due to TV shows that he directed and presented.

He was made an honorary citizen of the city of Leipzig and was awarded the National Prize of the GDR in 1953. After his death in 1955, a bust was installed at Leipzig zoo.
