= David Amsel Meyer =

David Amsel Meyer (19 September 1755 – 30 August 1813) was a Danish businessman and financial advisor to the Danish government. In 1780, he became the first Jewish member of Grosserer-Societetet.

== Early life and education ==
Meyer was born on 19 September 1755 in Copenhagen, the son of merchant Amsel Jacob Meyer (Hausen) (c. 1728–98) and Brendel Meyer (died 1763). His father was after the mother's death married to Hitzelia Meyer (c. 1746–1819). The family lived at Gammel Strand 44. Meyer received a very poor education but showed an unusual gift for mercantile business. With substantial credits from relatives in Altona and Amsterdam, he was quickly able to establish a thriving wholesale business. It was overseas trade and exchange transactions that were his speciality. In 1780, after considerable opposition, he was the first Jew to acquire citizenship as a wholesale merchant (grosserer) in Copenhagen. In 1793, together with his nephew, he formed the large trading house Meyer & Trier. After the turn of the century, he started to act as a financial advisor to the Danish government.

Meyer owned the property at Frederiksholms Kanal 5 as well as the La Fontaine House in Gentofte north of the city.

== Personal life ==
In April 1776 in Altona, Meyer married Jacobine (Jochebed) Meyer (c. 1754–1843). She was the daughter of financier Israel Jacob Meyer (died 1802) and his first wife, Edel Minden (died 1782). He was the maternal uncle of businessman Ernst Meyer (1797–1861).
