= Palatine raphe =

Raphe of the oral cavity

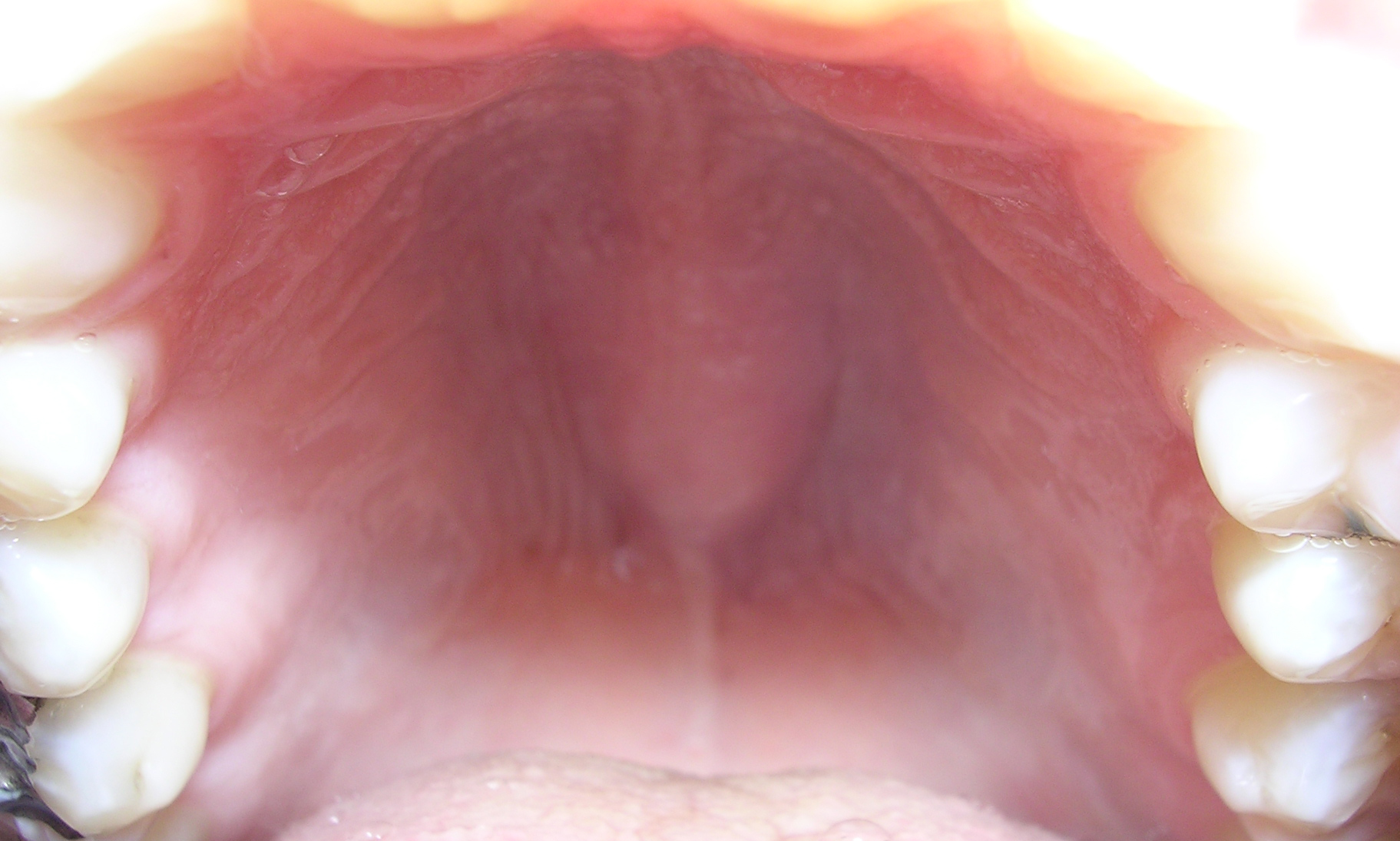
- Palate exhibiting torus palatinus. (Raphe visible near center.)

Details

Identifiers
- Latin: raphe palati
- TA98: A05.1.01.105
- TA2: 2782
- FMA: 75111

The palatine raphe (also median palatine raphe) is a raphe of the oral cavity. It is a narrow, slight midline ridge extending anteroposteriorly across the palate, from the incisive papilla anteriorly to the palatine uvula posteriorly. Beneath the raphe, the submucosa is absent.

== Anatomy ==
The palatine raphe is a midline tendinous band of the palate.

=== Relations and attachments ===
The raphe is a surface feature overlying - and indicating - the intermaxillary suture, and median palatine suture.

The greater palatine foramen may be palpated on either side about half way between the palatine raphe, and the palatal gingival margin of the 2nd or 3rd upper molar tooth.

The palatine raphe serves as an attachment for multiple muscles: the palatoglossus muscle arises from the posterior portion of the raphe; the levator veli palatini muscle and (the tendon of) the tensor veli palatini muscle insert into the raphe.
