= Gammel Strand 40 =

Building in Copenhagen, Denmark

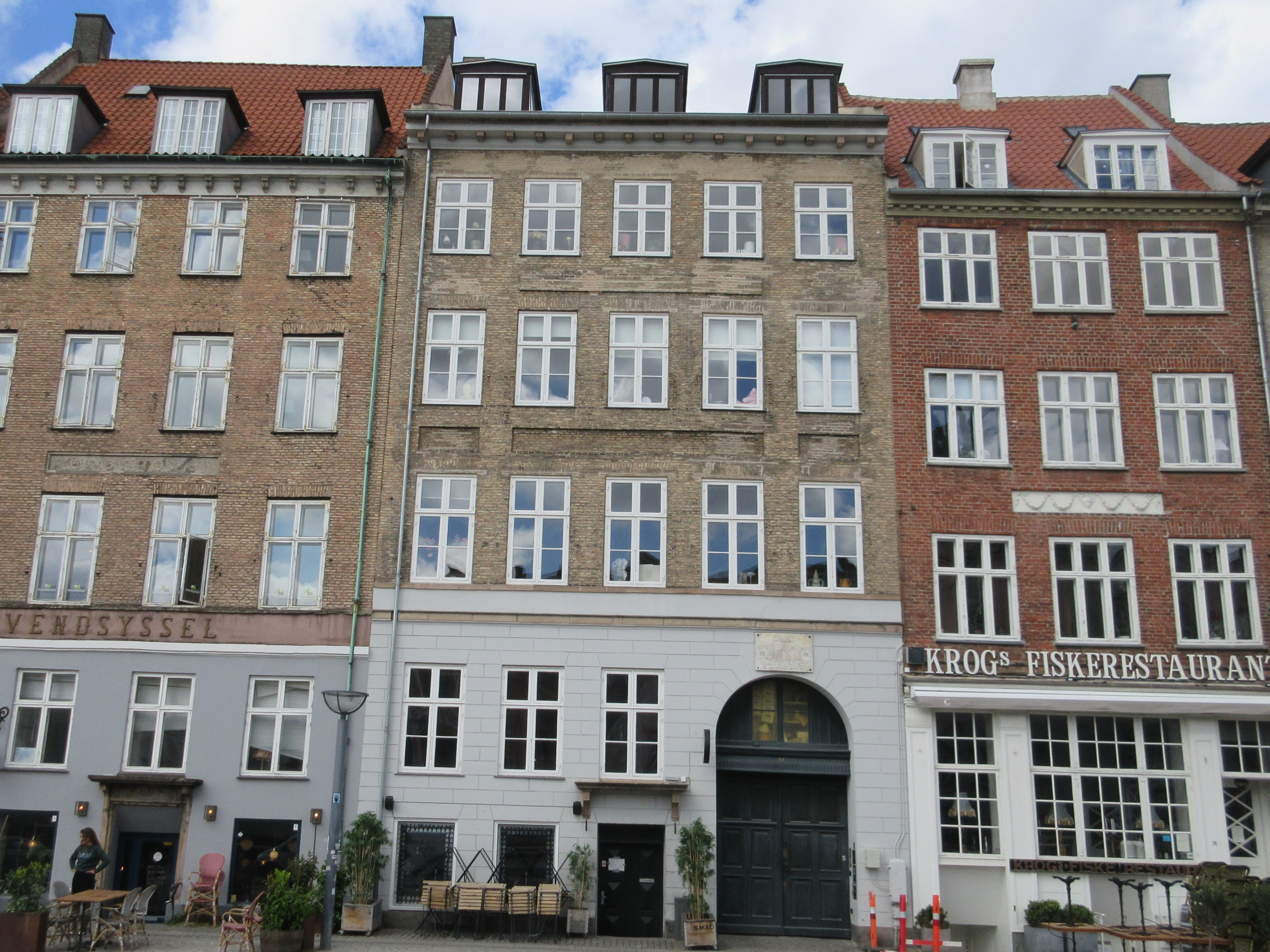
- Interactive map of the Gammel Strand 40 area

General information
- Location: Copenhagen, Denmark
- Coordinates: 55°40′39.86″N 12°34′42.2″E
- Renovated: 1801

Gammel Strand 40 is a Neoclassical property overlooking Slotsholmen Canal in the Olt Town of Copenhagen, Denmark. The building was listed in the Danish registry of protected buildings and places in 1945. A commemorative plaque above the doorway commemorates that Georg Carstensen, founder of Tivoli Gardens, was a resident in the building when his amusement park opened in 1843. Other notable former residents of Gammel Strand 40 include the archeologist Peter Oluf Brøndsted, writer and editor Jacob Davidsen (1813–1891), songwriter Peter Faber, politician and bishop Ditlev Gothard Monra and journalist Henrik Cacling.d

== History ==
=== 17th and 18th centuries ===
The property belonged to wine merchant (vintapper) Evert Funch from at least the 1670s. In 1674, it passed to his grandson Evert Funch the Younger. His property was listed in Copenhagen's first cadastre of 1689 as No. 11 in Strand Quarter. His widow Bodild kept it until her death. It was then sold at auction to Icelandic merchant Christian Jensen Abedsøe (deed issued 13 January 1713). His widow was later married to Icelandic merchant Christian Pedersen Borup. He was the owner of the property until at least 1728.

=== Ahron and David Jacobson ===
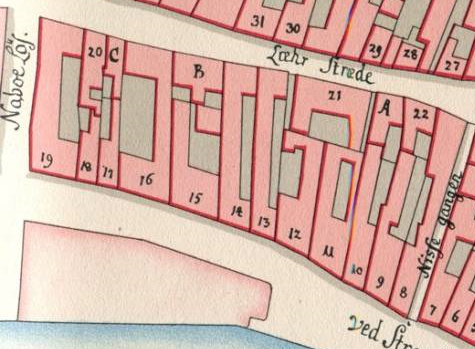
No. 11 seen on a detail from Christian Gedde's map of Strand Quarter, 1756.

The property was later acquired by the Jewish court medallist Aron Jacobse. His property was again listed as No. 11 in the new cadastre of 1756.

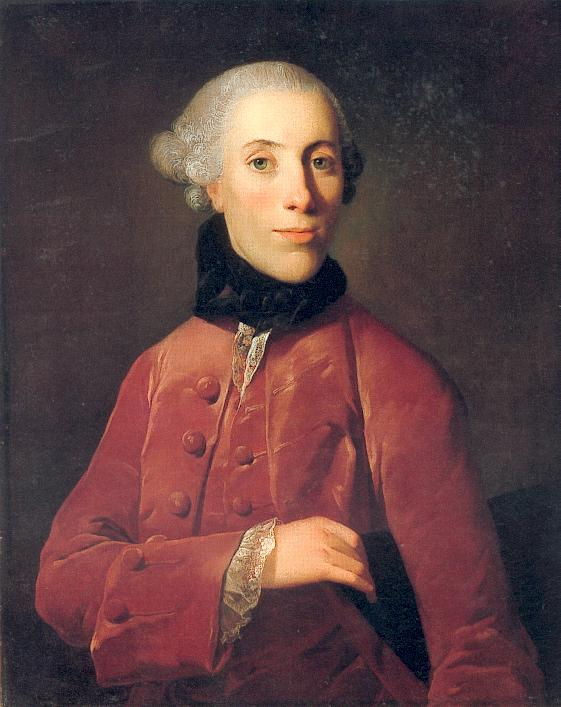
Ahron Jacobsen painted by Jens Juel.

The property was after Ahron Jacobsen's death passed to his sons David and Salomon Ahron Jacobson. They had both followed in their father's footsteps as court medallists. Their property was home to seven households at the time of the 1787 census. Salomon Ahron Jacobson resided in the building with his wife Inerlo, their three children (aged three to eight), a maid and a caretaker. David Jacobsen resided in the building with his wife Billa, their four children (aged three to seven) and two maids. Fridericha, a widow, resided in the building with her son Levin. Salomon Amsel Meyer. a Jewish merchant, resided in the building with his wife Hanne Goldschmidt, their four-year-old son Jacob and one maid. Christian Grolo, a Lottery collector, resided in the building with his wife Cathrine Marie Schwierman, their one-year-old daughter Marie Anne and one maid. Gert Nielssen Dyrberg, a restaurateur ("roaster"), resided in the basement with his wife Gertru Ols Datter and their two children (aged 11 and 12). Maren Berg, a junk dealer, was also a resident of the building.

Salomon Jacobsen moved to Altona a few years later, leaving his younger brother as the sole owner of the property in Copenhagen.

The property was destroyed in the Copenhagen Fire of 1795, together with most of the other buildings in the area. The present building on the site was constructed in 1799–1801 for court engraver David Ahron Jacobsen. The narrow courtyard was originally divided in two by a warehouse but it was demolished in 1958.

Jacobsen's property was home to 19 residents in three households at the time of the 1801 census. David Aron Jacobsen resided in the building with his second wife Bellou (bnée Meyer), their four children (aged seven to 21) and one maid. Julius Friderich Ludvig Count Rantzau (1770-1820), a count, resided in the building with his wife Elisabeth (née de Windt, 1769–1832), two male servants and three maids. Otte Didrich Lutken Agerbeck (1747-1806), a captain in the Danish Asiatic Company and alderman of the Pilot's Guild in Copenhagen, resided in the building with his wife Johanne Brache (née Schumacher), a housekeeper and a maid.

The property was listed as No. 10 in the new cadastre of 1806. It was at that time still owned by Jacobsen. He died on 12 December 1812 and was buried in the Jewish Cemetery in Møllegade.

=== 1810s ===
The archeologist Peter Oluf Brøndsted was among the residents of the building from 1814 to 1818. In 1817, No. 10 was merged with No. 22B as No. 11 & 22 B.

=== Hendrik Eskild Schierning ===
The property was at some point acquired by businessman Hendrik Eskild Schierning (1799-1864). In 1830, he constructed a large new apartment building on the part of the property that faced Læderstræde.

The mew building in Læderstræde was home to 32 residents in six households at the time of the 1840 census. Hendrik Eskild Schierning resided on the second floor with his wife Dorthea Sophie Svalberg, their three sons (aged 16 to 20), two lodgers and one maid. One of the two lodgers was pupil at the Royal Danish Theatre Gunder Emanuel Gundersen (1817-1880). The other lodger was pharmacy pupil Matthias Johann Riemenschneider. Johan Hen. William Prosch (-1843), a French teacher with title of overkrigskommissær, resided on the ground floor with his French-born wife Caroline Sophie (née Brément) and their three children (aged 13 to 21). John Erik Leerbech (1805-1860), a police officer (politiadjudant), resided on the first floor with his wife Frederikke Lovise Leerbech (née Michaelsen, 1688–873) and one maid. Christian Jacob Nikolaj Westerholt (1790-1858(, an army major now employed in the Office for State Debt (Statsgældskontoret), resided on the ground floor with his wife Sophie Hedevig Helene Christiane Buch (1790-1857), their three children (aged 20 to 26), the lodger Ludvig Gotschalk(student) and one maid. Hans Jørgen Ahrentz, a master plumber, resided in the building with his wife Calote Amali Ahrentz, their two children (aged six and nine), one apprentice and one maid. Christen Sørensen and Anders Christian Christensen, two male servants, resided in the garret. The building on Gammel Strand was home to 42 residents in five households. Cornelius Hansen, a restaurateur, resided on the ground floor with his wife Christiane Hansen (née Nielsen), their four children (aged two to 10), two students, a housekeeper (husjomfru) and four maids. Levin Benjamin Holländer, a merchant (grosserer), resided on the first floor with his wife Minne Holländer (née Heckscher), four of their children (aged 10 to 30), an employee in the trading firm and one maid. Johannes Hjort Ussing, a civil servant in Overformynderiet's 3rd office, resided on the second floor with his wife Werner Jasper Andreas Ussing, their four children (aged 10 to 20), a housekeeper (husjomfru) and a maid. One of the four children was the later jurist and politician Werner Ussing (1818-1873). and another one was the later filologist and archeologist Johan Louis Ussing (1820-1905=. Johannes Nicolai Henrich Wilkens, a high-ranking official in the Bank of Denmark with title of kancelliråd, resided on the third floor with his wife Johanne Wilkens, four of their children (aged 11 to 30) and two maids. Ole Rasmussen, a runner at Prince Ferdinand's court, resided in the basement with his wife Kirstine Sisse Sørensen, their two children (aged three and six) and one maid.

Georg Carstensen, founder of Tivoli Gardens, had just moved into one of the apartments when his amusement park opened in 1843,

Gammel Strand 11 was home to 39 residents six households at the 1845 census. Johan Christian Prydz Hansen, a businessman (handelsfuldmægtig), resided on the ground floor with his wife Henriette Emilie (mée Krabbe), their five-year-old daughter Julie Amalie Christiane, his sister-in-law Lorentze Nicoline Krabbe, three lodgers and one maid. Georg Carstensen resided in the first floor apartment with one maid. Peter Larcher, a solo dancer at the Royal Danish Ballet, resided on the second floor with his wife Cicilie Larcher, their four children (aged two to 14), lodger Johanne Marie Kierulf and three maids. Niels Georg Brasin, a Candidate of Philosophy, resided alone on the third floor. O. Rasmussen, the proprietor of a tavern in the basement, resided in the associated dwelling with his wife Sisse Cristina Sørensen, their two children (aged seven and 10), four male servants and two maids. H. Schjerning, the owner of the property, resided on a mezzanine (indskudt etage), with his wife Dorthea Sophie Schjerning, their 20-year-old son Cand Emil Schjerning, the art student Johan Peter Molin, one male servant, two male servants and one a caretajer.

Jacob Davidsen (1813–1891), a writer and editorial secretary of Flyveposten, was among the resident in 1850. Peter Faber, inspector at the College of Advanced Technology, was a resident from 1850 to 1858.

=== 1860–1900 ===
The property was home to 26 residents in five households at the time of the 1860 census. Julius Karl Levy, a merchant, resided on the ground floor with his wife Julie Levy and one maid. James Petersen, another merchant, resided on the first floor with his wife Johanne Kirstine Petersen, their two children (aged six and eight), a governess and a maid. Georg Ogilev Meyer, a third merchant, resided on the second floor with his wife Antoinette Josephine Meyer, their two-year-old daughter and two maids. Christian Albert Frederik Thomsen, a captain in Generalstaben, resided on the third floor with his wife Thora Michella Thomsen and one maid. Carl Ludvig Theobald Clemmensen, a 21-year-old bookbinder, resided in the garret. Niels Christistian Hansen, proprietor of a tavern in the basement, resided in the associated dwelling with his wife Maren Christine, their three children (aged five to 13), the 75-year-old widow Inger Christensen, one lodger and one maid.

Ditlev Gothard Monrad, who was Bishop of Lolland-Falster as well as an MP, was a resident in the building in 1853. Henrik Cacling, a renowned Politiken journalist and co-founder of Dansk Journalistforbund, resided in the apartment on the first floor in 1890.

=== 20th and 21st centuries ===
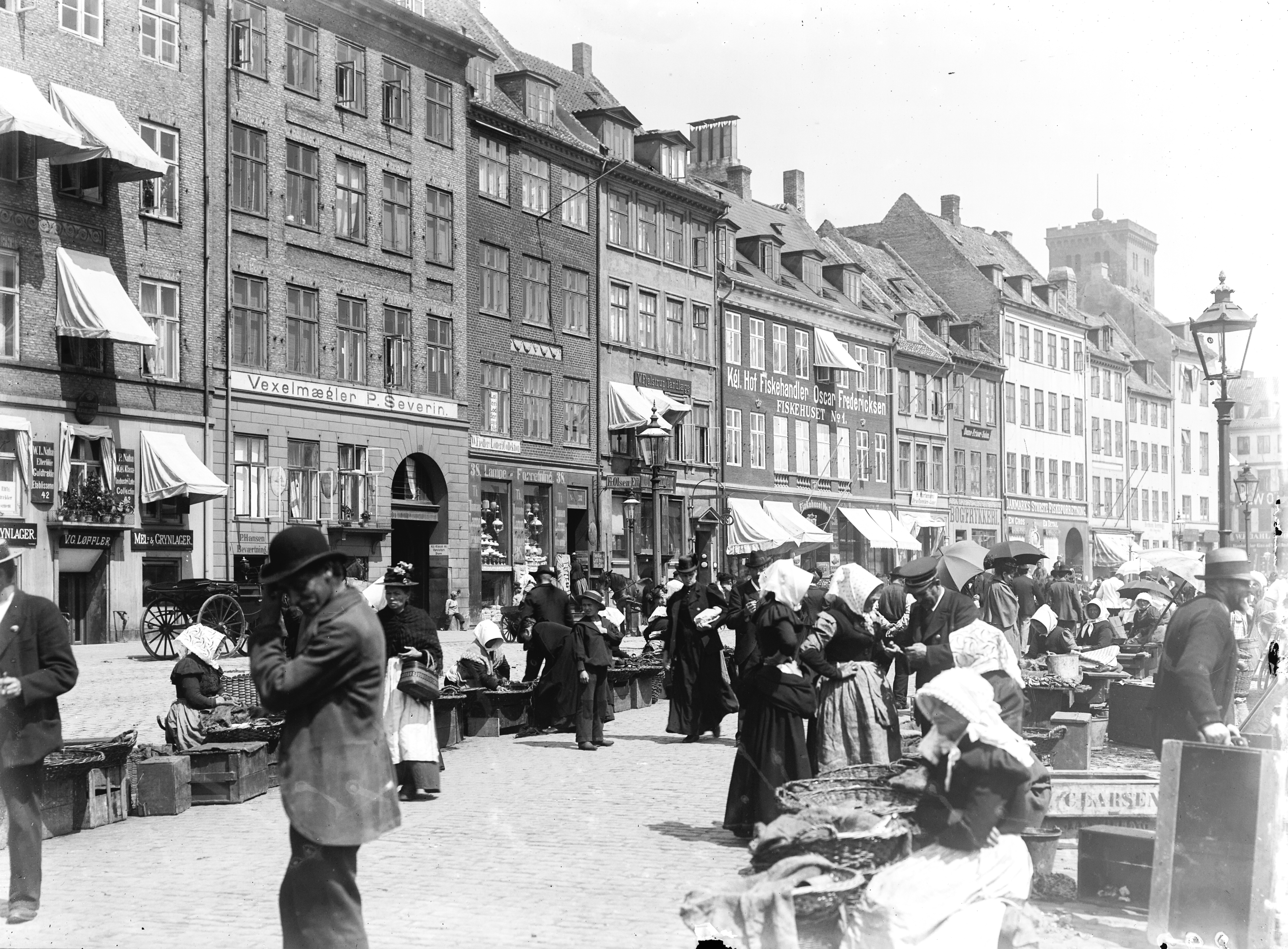
The property seen to the left ob ohoto by Frederik Riise from c. 1900.

The financier O. Severin was around the turn of the century based in the building. The writer n Kjeld Abell was among the resident of the building in around 1938.

The property was at some point acquired by Michael Goldschmidt through his property company Atlas A/S. In February 2007, he sold Atlas A/S to Icelandic company Stodir (later Landic Property). In 2009, as part of the 2008–2011 Icelandic financial crisis, Landic Properties was declared in suspension of payments and went into liquidation. In October 2009, Gammel Strand 40&Læderstræde 9 was part of a portfolio of 31 former Atlas A/S properties sold for DKK 2 billions to Jeudan.

== Architecture ==
Gammel Strand 40 is constructed with four storeys over a walk-out basement and is five bays wide. It is constructed in red brick and stands on a granite plinth. A two-bay gateway is located in the right-hand side of the building. A commemorative plaque above the gate commemorates that Georg Carstensen lived in the building when he opened Tivoli Gardens. The facade is finished by a dentilated cornice. A side wing, six bays long plus a canted bay in each end, projects from the rear side of the building and connects to a small two-bay rear wing in the other end.

== Today ==
As of 2008, Gammel Strand 40/Læderstræde 9 belonged to Atlas Ejendomme A/S.
