= Nyhavn 29 =

Listed building in Copenhagen, Denmark

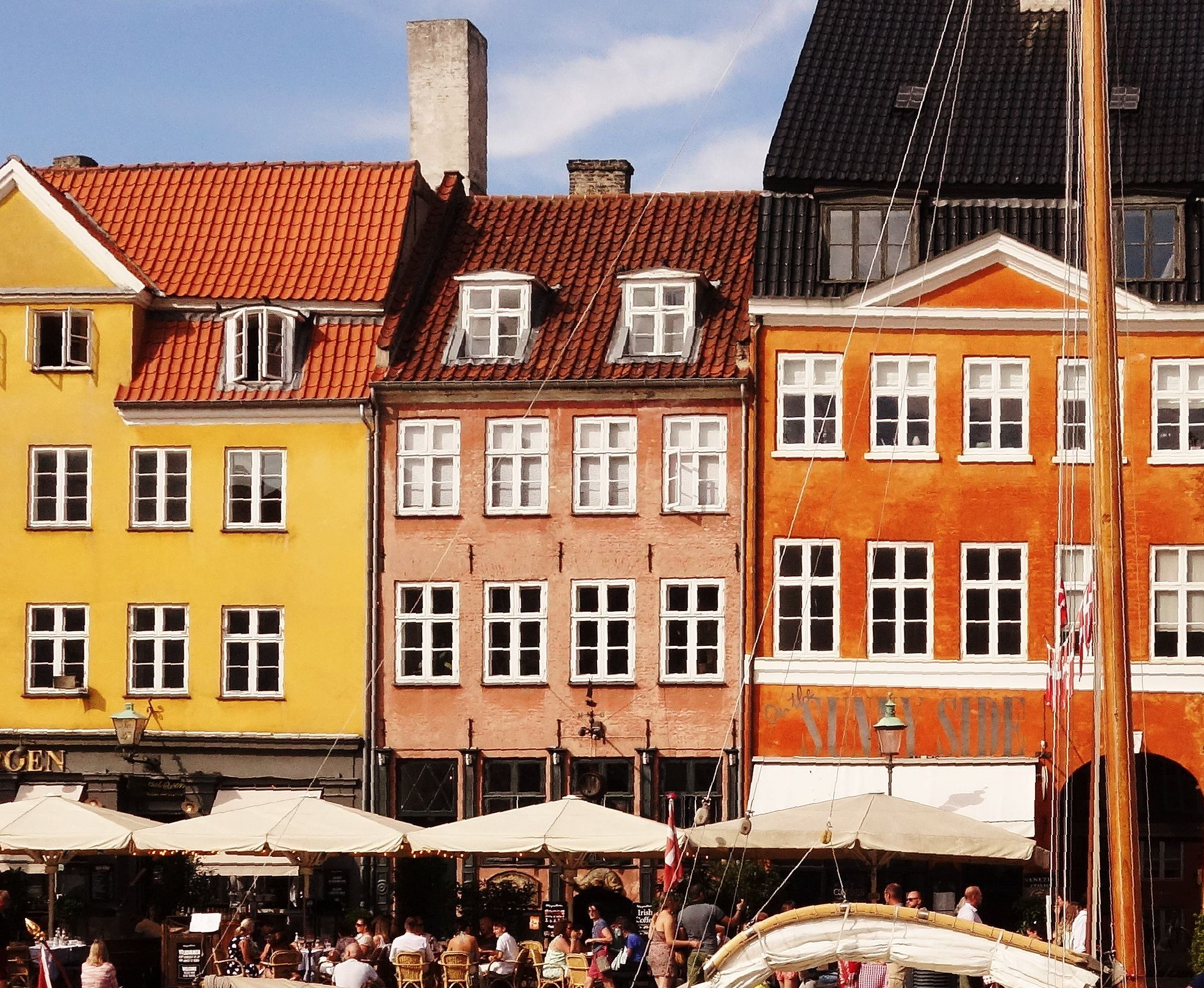
- Interactive map of the Nyhavn 29 area

General information
- Location: Copenhagen, Denmark, Denmark
- Coordinates: 55°40′49.01″N 12°35′24.18″E
- Completed: 1755

Nyhavn 20 is a 17th-century building overlooking the Nyhavn canal in central Copenhagen, Denmark. It was listed in the Danish registry of protected buildings and places in 1945. The building houses a bar in the basement and a residential apartment on the upper floors. The facade features a relief of a fish above the main entrance, flanked by two reliefs of sailing ships.

== Architecture ==
Nyhavn 29 is constructed in brick on a stone plinth with three stories over a walk-out basement. The four-bays-wide facade is plastered and painted in a pale red color. It is decorated with five carved, green-painted wooden panels on the ground floor and a white-painted cornice below the roof. Five wall anchors are seen below the windows of the first and second floor. The main entrance in the bay farthest to the left is topped by a transom window. It is reached via a flight of stone steps. The basement entrance is located in the second bay from the right. It is topped by a relief of a fish. It is flanked by two reliefs of sailing ships. The pitched, red tile roof features two dormer windows towards the street and one towards the yard. A two-story, half-timbered side wing with a first-story cantilever extends from the rear side of the building along the east side of a narrow courtyard. The timber framing of the upper floor forms an open gallery. The side wing is topped by a mono-pitched red tile roof. A red painted door is located in the fourth bay from the north.

== Gallery ==
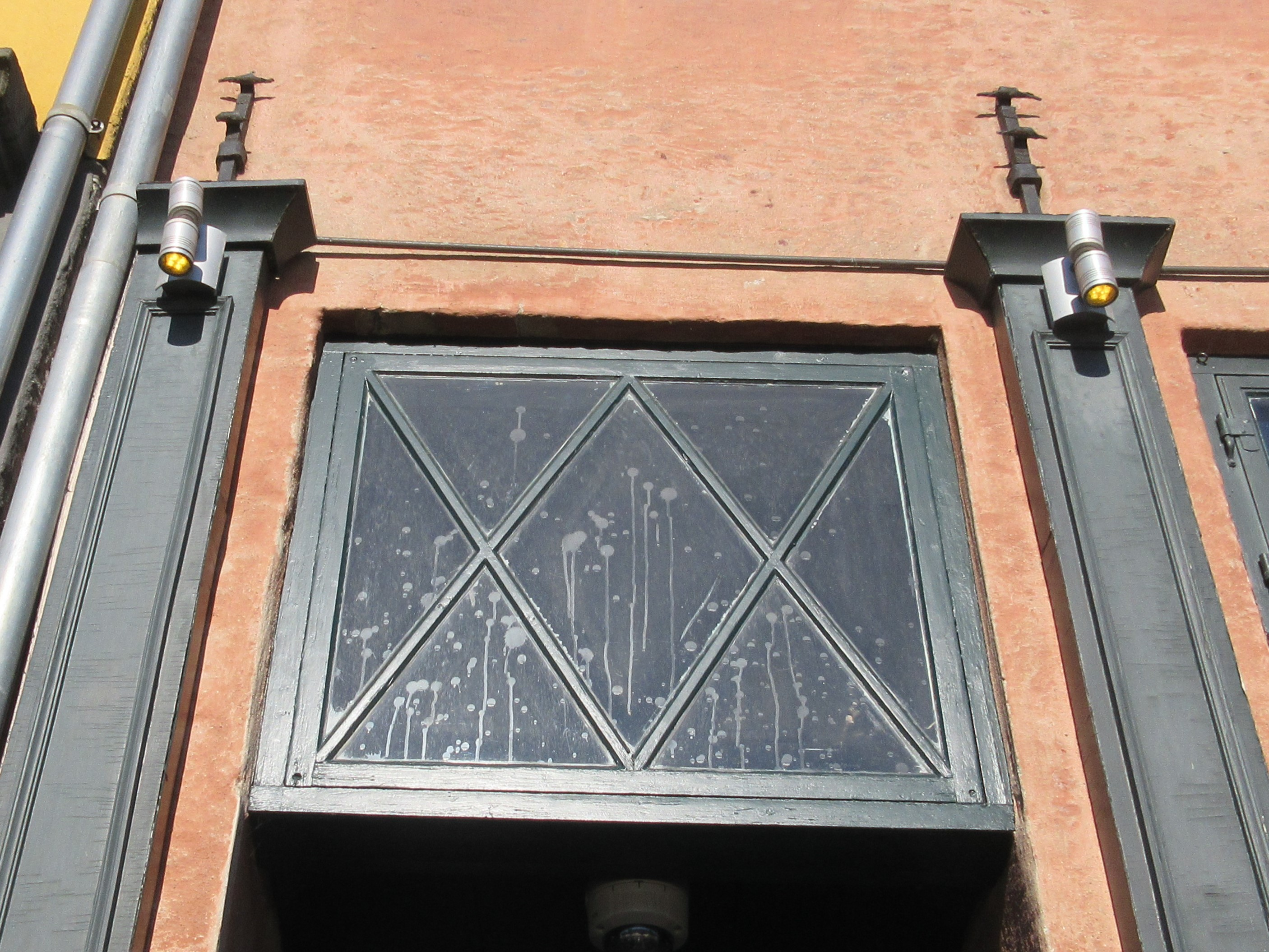
The transom window above the main entrance

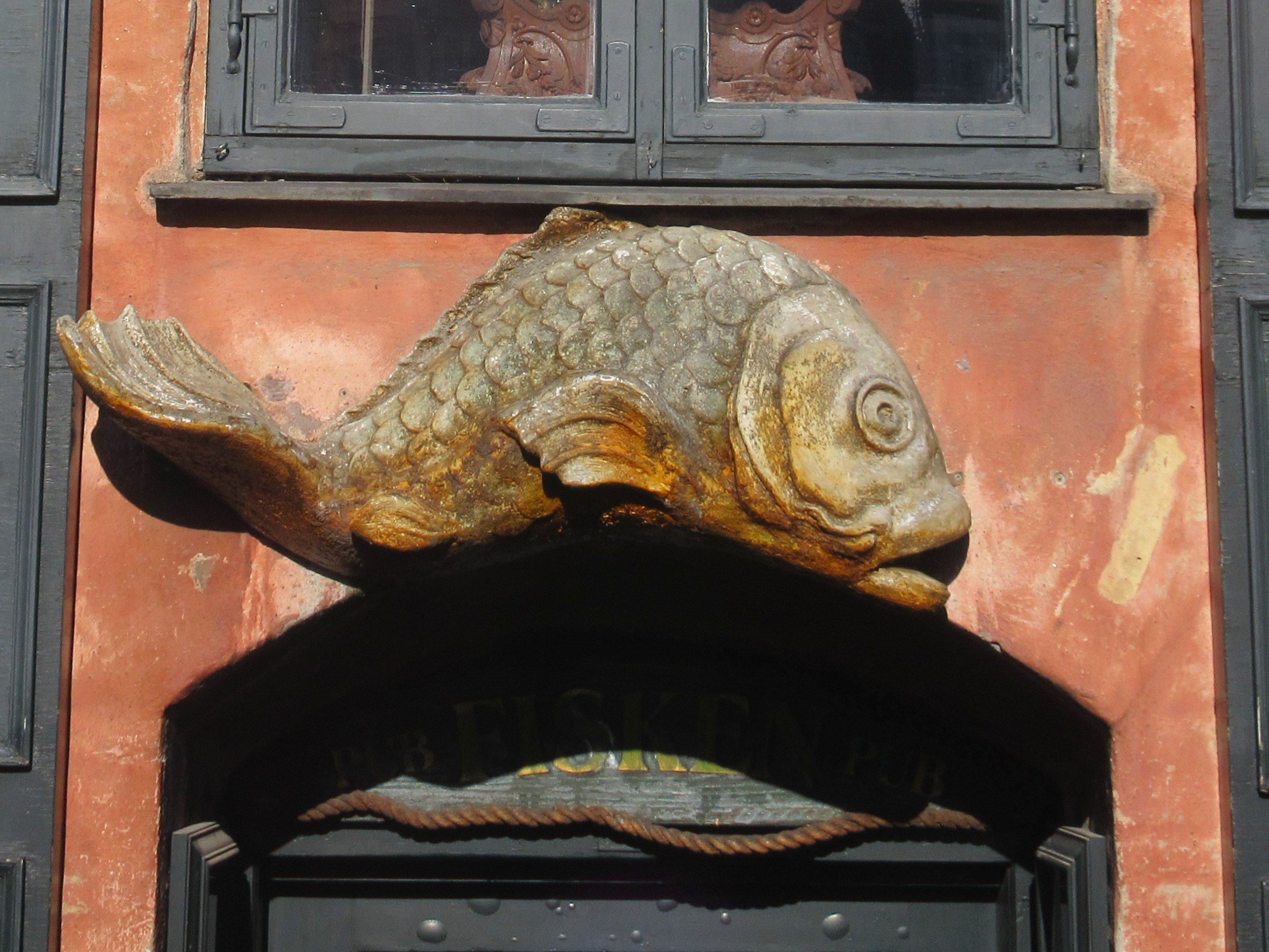
The fish relief above the basement entrance

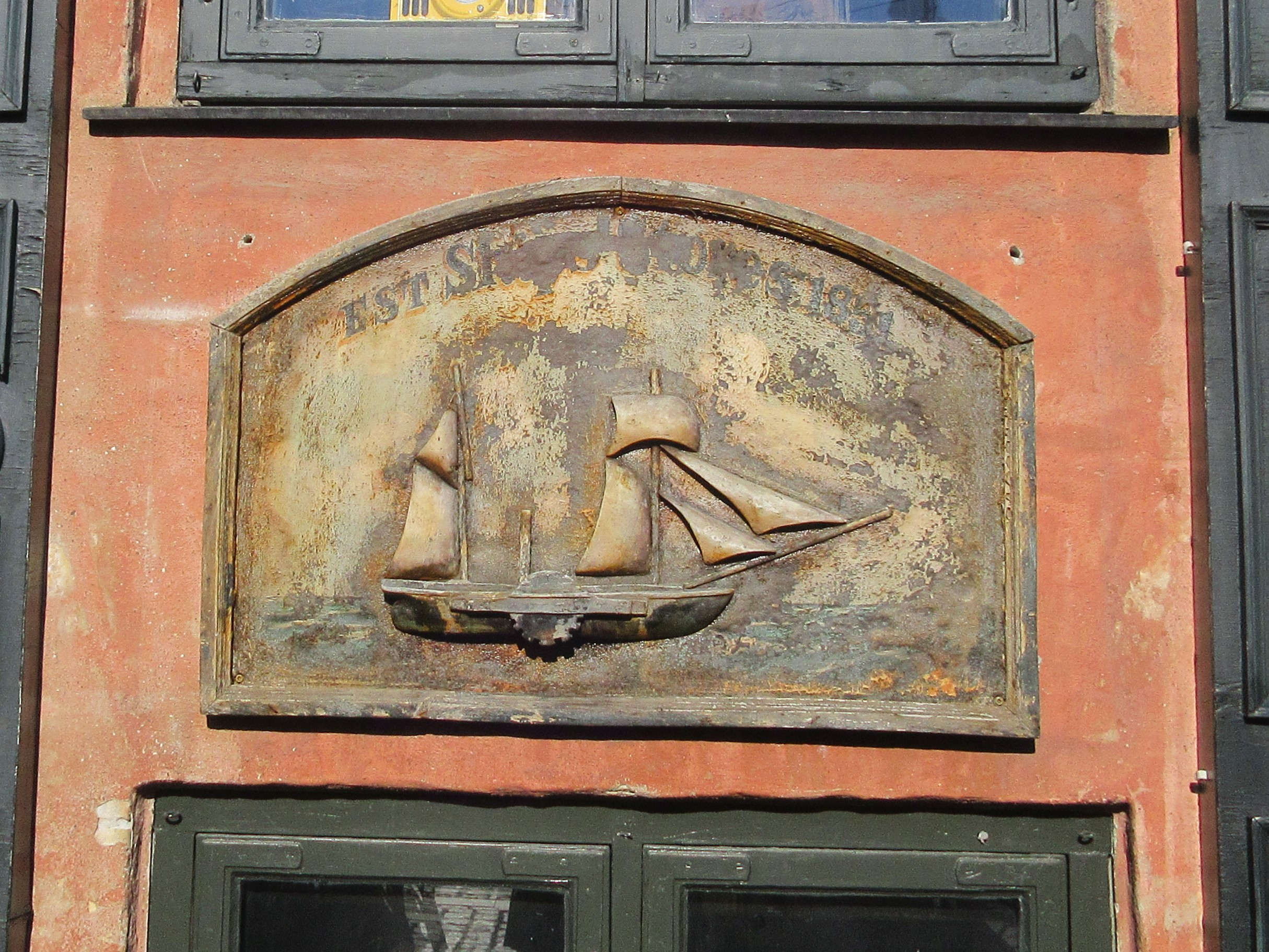
Ship relief below one of the windows
