= Ludwig Lewin Jacobson =

Danish surgeon and anatomist

Ludvig Levin Jacobson
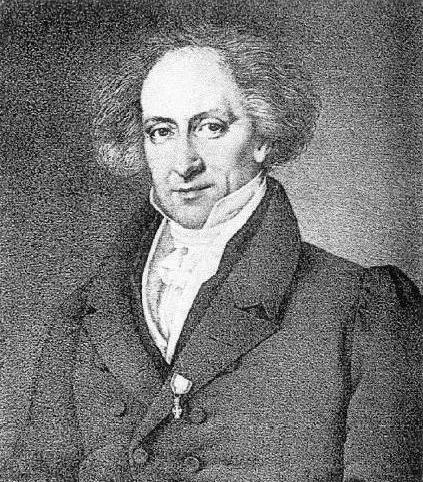
- Born: 10 January 1783; Copenhagen, Denmark
- Died: 29 August 1843 (aged 60); Copenhagen, Denmark
- Resting place: Assistens Cementery
- Education: University of Copenhagen
- Known for: Jacobson's organ; Jacobson's nerve
- Spouse: Angelique Jacobine Vilhelmine Marie Petzholdt
- Father: Salomon Ahron Jacobson
- Relatives: Albert Jacobson (brother)
- Awards: Order of the Dannebrog; Cross of Honour of the Order of Dannebrog
- Scientific career
- Workplaces: University of Copenhagen Royal Veterinary and Agricultural University

Ludwig Lewin Jacobson (10 January 1783 – 29 August 1843) was a Danish surgeon.

== Early life ==
Born in Copenhagen to a Jewish family, he received his early education at the German Lyceum in Stockholm, Sweden, but on deciding to pursue the study of medicine returned to Copenhagen, where he entered the surgical academy. He was graduated as C. B. and M.D. in 1804, and was appointed at his alma mater assistant surgeon in 1806 and lecturer on chemistry in 1807. From 1807 to 1810 he was engaged as a tutor at the Royal Veterinary and Agricultural High School (Danish: Den Kongelige Veterinær- og Landbohøjskole) in Copenhagen.

== Jacobsonian organ ==
During the bombardment of Copenhagen by the British in 1807, Jacobson served as a military surgeon at the lazaretto of the Freemasons' academical lodge, and after the capitulation he showed his zeal for scientific research by requesting and obtaining permission to inspect the British field-hospitals, of which he later (1809) published an interesting account in the "Bibliothek for Læger." It was, however, in the field of comparative anatomy that Jacobson won his reputation. This science, which at that time constituted the main basis for the study of biology, was being zealously cultivated by the most distinguished savants. In 1809 Jacobson announced to the Danske Videnskabernes Selskab his rediscovery of and researches concerning a hitherto unknown absorptive organ in the human nose (later named after him "the Jacobsonian organ"). Of this discovery G. Cuvier published an account, "Description Anatomique d'un Organe Observé dans les Mammifères," in "Annales du Muséum d'Histoire Naturelle" (Paris, 1811). This discovery at once placed Jacobson in the front rank of the biologists of his age. The Danish society of sciences awarded him a silver medal of honor; he was given military rank as a regimental surgeon, and was granted a royal stipend to enable him to travel through Germany and France.

During his sojourn in Paris Jacobson devoted a great deal of time to the study of practical medicine and surgery, and was so successful that the Danish government, on his return in 1813, obtained for him admission into the French army in order that he might study the medical system employed therein. In 1814 he served in a field-hospital near Leipzig, and became dangerously ill with fever when the lazaretto was attacked and pillaged by Cossacks. He returned to Denmark the same year (1814) and received from the University of Kiel an honorary diploma as doctor of medicine and surgery. In 1816 the same university conferred upon him the title of professor.

== Surgical instruments ==
Jacobson invented several appliances which proved of great benefit to the surgical profession. Of these may be mentioned his apparatus for the arrest of arterial hemorrhage and his lithoclast for the crushing of stones in the bladder. The latter instrument, which replaced the French lithotrites then in use, was later somewhat modified by the eminent French surgeon Guillaume Dupuytren.

== Later life ==
In 1833 the Académie des Sciences awarded Jacobson one of the Monthyon prizes (4,000 francs), having previously awarded him a gold medal for his important researches into the venal system of the kidneys in birds and reptiles. On the death of the English anatomist Sir Everard Home, Jacobson became his successor as a corresponding member of the Académie des Sciences. In 1836 he was elected an honorary member of the Kongelige Medicinske Selskab, the Royal Medical Society (of Denmark).

Jacobson was created a knight of the Dannebrog in 1829, and he received the silver cross of the same order in 1836. He was also honored with decorations from several foreign potentates. In spite, however, of all the flattering recognition that he received, Jacobson felt depressed because he as a Jew was barred from the University of Copenhagen. A professorship had been offered him on the condition that he embrace Christianity, but he refused to abandon the faith of his fathers. His religious belief prevented also his accepting a special invitation to attend the first meeting of natural scientists to be held in Christiania (Oslo) in 1822, because at that time the edict forbidding Jews to stay in Norway was still in force. In 1840, he was elected a foreign member of the Royal Swedish Academy of Sciences. He died in Copenhagen in 1843.

== Personal life ==
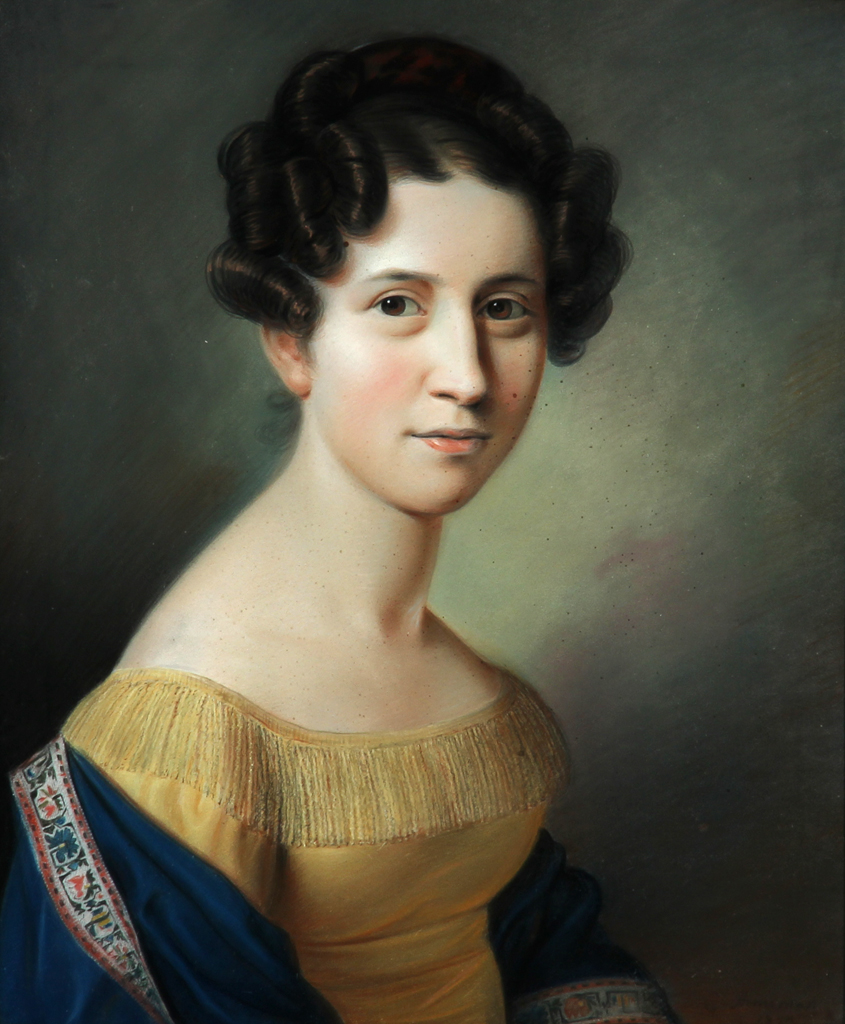
Angelique Jacobine Vilhelmine Marie Petzholdt painted by Christian Horneman in 1823

On 9 October 1823, Jacobsen married Angelique Jacobine Vilhelmine Marie Petzholdt (4 February 1799 – 25 March 1870) in St. Peter's Church. She was the daughter of the businessman Johan Jacob Petzholdt (1766–1836) and his second wife, Josephine Marie Fontaine (1770–1812). She was the younger sister of the painter Fritz Petzholdt.

Their elder daughter Louise Marie Angelique Jacobson (1827–1908) married the estate owner and businessman Carl Vilhelm Wolfhagen (1823–1891). Their younger daughter Vilhelmine (1829–1913) married the physician Carl Levy (1808–1885).

== Writings ==
Of Jacobson's many writings the following may be mentioned: "Undersògelser over den Steensen'ske Næsekirtel hos Pattedyr og Fugle," Copenhagen, 1813; "Nyreportaaresystemet hos Fisk, Padder, og Krybdyr," ib. 1813, 2d ed. 1821; "Primordialnyrerne," ib. 1830; "Primordialkraniet," ib. 1842.

== Eponyms ==
- Jacobson's cartilage
- Jacobson’s nerve
- Jacobson's organ
