= Incisive papilla =

Oval midline mucosal prominence of the anterior hard palate overlying the incisive fossa

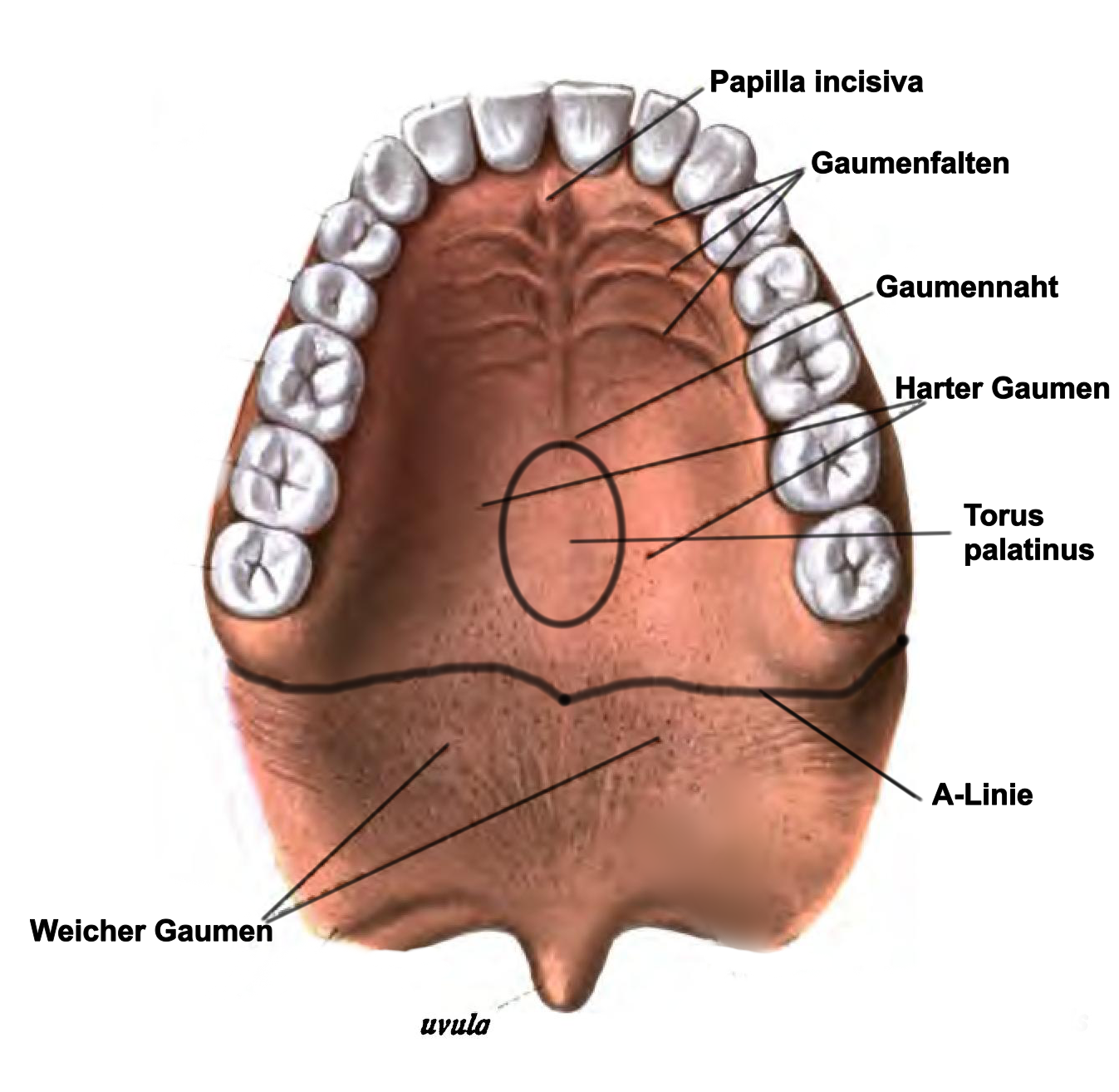
- The papilla incisiva in the anterior hard palate

Details

Identifiers
- Latin: papilla incisiva
- TA98: A05.1.01.107
- TA2: 2784
- FMA: 77185

The incisive papilla is an oval midline mucosal prominence of the anterior hard palate overlying the incisive fossa. It is situated posteriorly to the central incisors, and represents the anterior extremity of the palatine raphe.

The incisive papilla marks the position of the foetal nasopalatine canal.

== Anatomy ==
=== Variation ===
Though generally referred to as round or oval in shape, the shape of the incisive papilla has been noted to vary in shape, its other potential shapes have been described as including: pear, spindle, flame, cylindrical, tapering, or dumb bell shaped.

== Microanatomy ==
The incisive papilla consist of dense connective tissue. It is lined with simple or pseudostratified columnar epithelium, and is often keratinized.

== Clinical significance ==
Pressure exerted upon the incisive papilla by maxillary dentures may cause pain or discomfort.

The incisive papilla is utilized as an anatomical landmark when administering a nasopalatine nerve block; the needle is inserted at a 45° angle just lateral to the incisive papilla.

== See also ==
- Papilla (disambiguation)
