= Human nose =

Feature of the human face

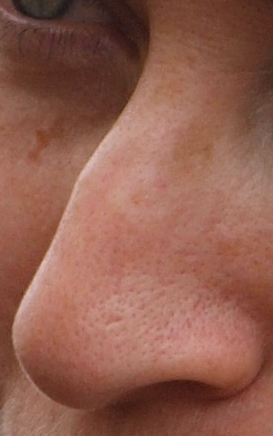

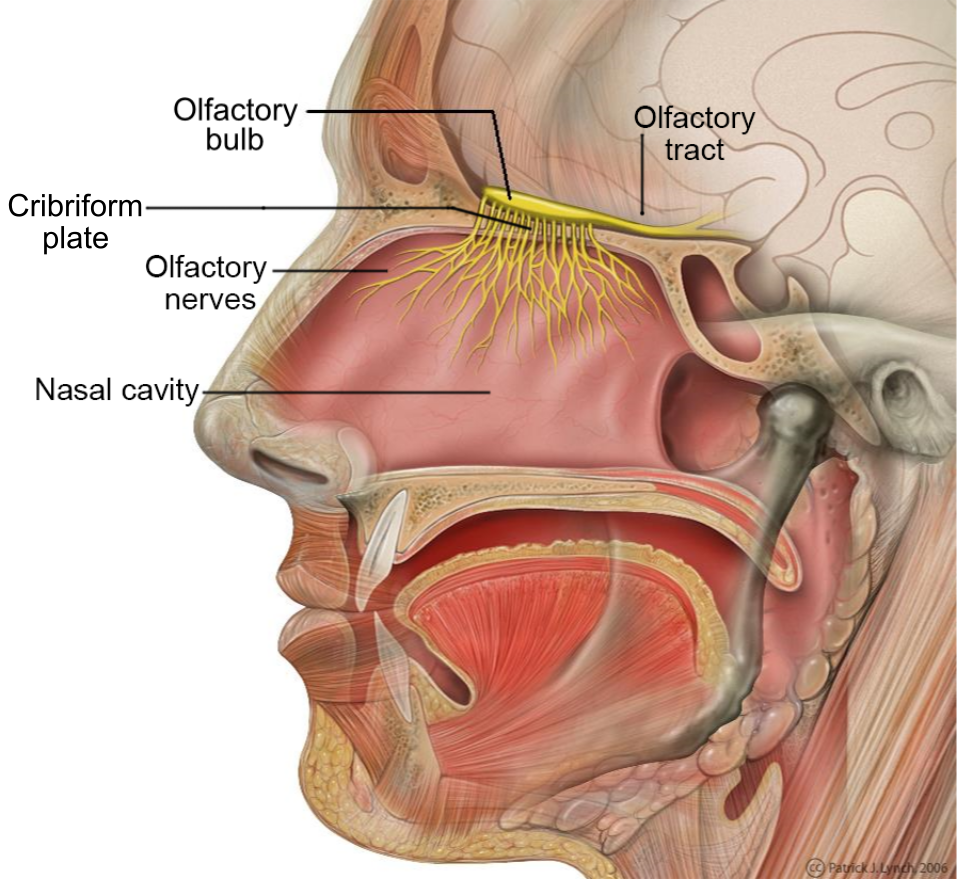
- Cross-section of the interior of a nose showing parts involved in smell (olfaction)

Details
- Artery: Sphenopalatine artery, greater palatine artery
- Vein: Facial vein
- Nerve: External nasal nerve

Identifiers
- Latin: nasus
- TA98: A06.1.01.001; A01.1.00.009
- TA2: 117
- FMA: 46472

The human nose is the first organ of the respiratory system. It is also the principal organ in the olfactory system. The shape of the nose is determined by the nasal bones and the nasal cartilages, including the nasal septum, which separates the nostrils and divides the nasal cavity into two.

The nose has an important function in breathing. The nasal mucosa lining the nasal cavity and the paranasal sinuses carries out the necessary conditioning of inhaled air by warming and moistening it. Nasal conchae, shell-like bones in the walls of the cavities, play a major part in this process. Filtering of the air by nasal hair in the nostrils prevents large particles from entering the lungs. Sneezing is a reflex to expel unwanted particles from the nose that irritate the mucosal lining. Sneezing can transmit infections, because aerosols are created in which the droplets can harbour pathogens.

Another major function of the nose is olfaction, the sense of smell. The area of olfactory epithelium, in the upper nasal cavity, contains specialised olfactory cells responsible for this function.

The nose is also involved in the function of speech. Nasal vowels and nasal consonants are produced in the process of nasalisation. The hollow cavities of the paranasal sinuses act as sound chambers that modify and amplify speech and other vocal sounds.

There are several plastic surgery procedures that can be done on the nose, known as rhinoplasties available to correct various structural defects or to change the shape of the nose. Defects may be congenital, or result from nasal disorders or from trauma. These procedures are a type of reconstructive surgery. An elective procedure to change a nose shape is a type of cosmetic surgery.

== Structure ==
Several bones and cartilages make up the bony-cartilaginous framework of the nose, and the internal structure. The nose is also made up of types of soft tissue such as skin, epithelia, mucous membrane, muscles, nerves, and blood vessels. In the skin there are sebaceous glands, and in the mucous membrane there are nasal glands. The bones and cartilages provide strong protection for the internal structures of the nose. There are several muscles that are involved in movements of the nose. The arrangement of the cartilages allows flexibility through muscle control to enable airflow to be modified.

=== Bones ===
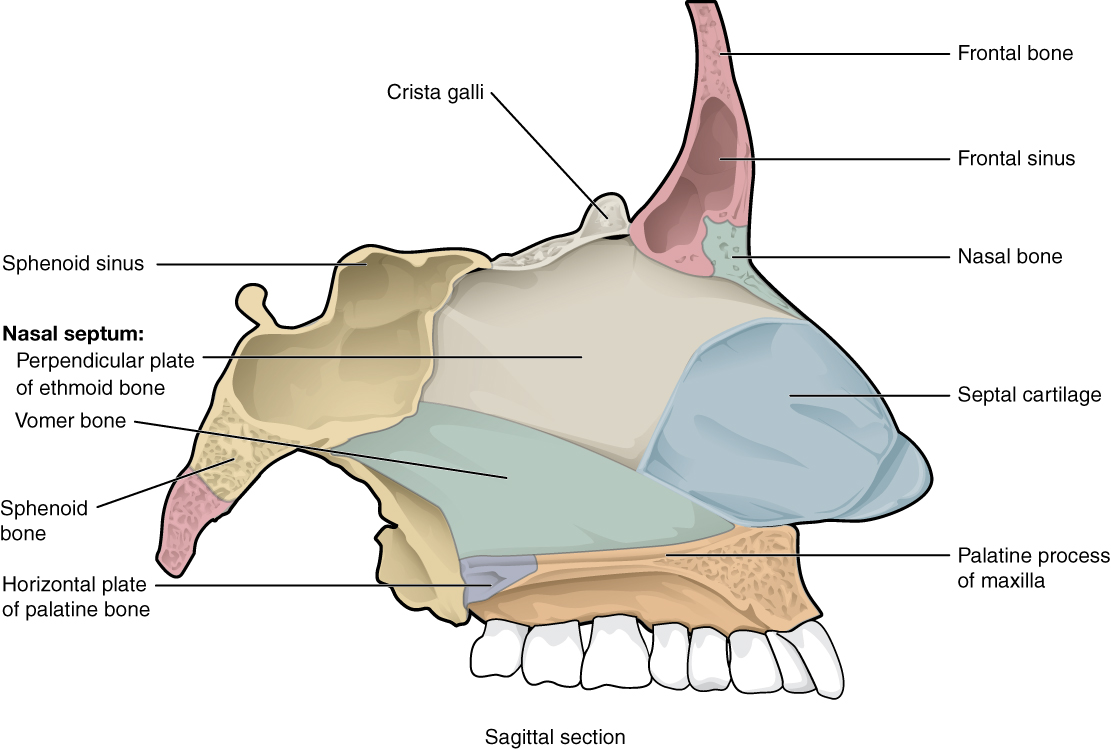
Bones of the nose and septal cartilage

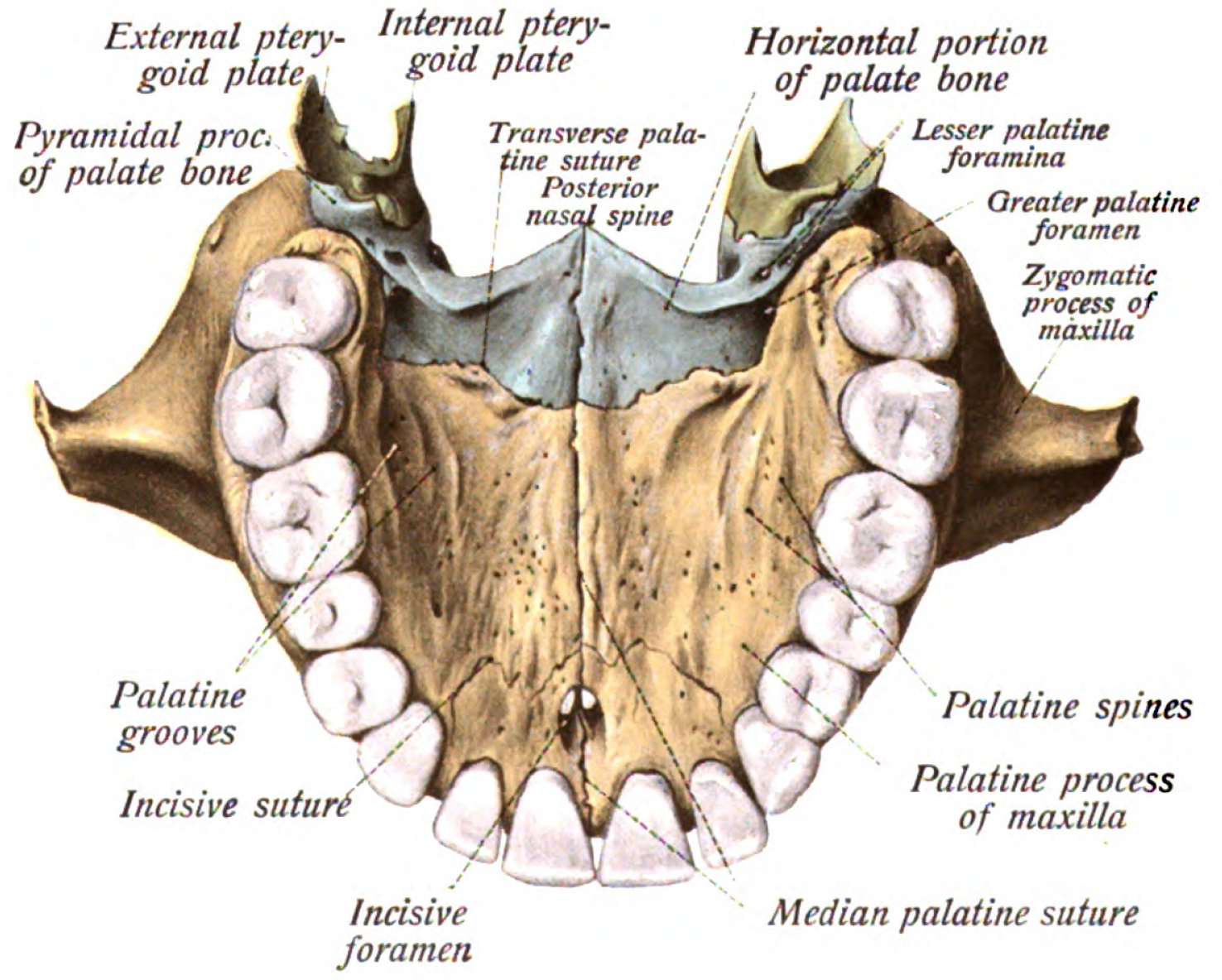
Roof of the mouth showing position of palatine bones making up the floor of the nose, and forming the posterior nasal spine for the attachment of the musculus uvulae.

The bony structure of the nose is provided by the maxilla, frontal bone, and a number of smaller bones.The topmost bony part of the nose is formed by the nasal part of the frontal bone, which lies between the brow ridges, and ends in a serrated nasal notch. A left and a right nasal bone join with the nasal part of the frontal bone at either side; and these at the side with the small lacrimal bones and the frontal process of each maxilla. The internal roof of the nasal cavity is composed of the horizontal, perforated cribriform plate of the ethmoid bone through which pass sensory fibres of the olfactory nerve. Below and behind the cribriform plate, sloping down at an angle, is the face of the sphenoid bone.

The wall separating the two cavities of the nose, the nasal septum, is made up of bone inside and cartilage closer to the tip of the nose. The bony part is formed by the perpendicular plate of the ethmoid bone at the top, and the vomer bone below. The floor of the nose is made up of the incisive bone and the horizontal plates of the palatine bones, and this makes up the hard palate of the roof of the mouth. The two horizontal plates join at the midline and form the posterior nasal spine that gives attachment to the musculus uvulae in the uvula.

The two maxilla bones join at the base of the nose at the lower nasal midline between the nostrils, and at the top of the philtrum to form the anterior nasal spine. This thin projection of bone holds the cartilaginous center of the nose. It is also an important cephalometric landmark.

=== Cartilages ===
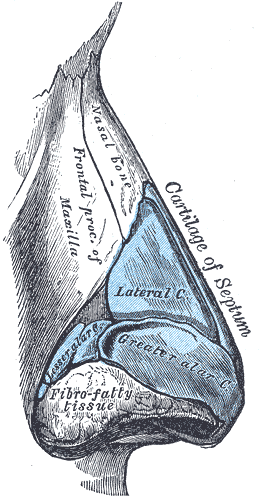
Nasal cartilages

The nasal cartilages are the septal, lateral, major alar, and minor alar cartilages. The major and minor cartilages are also known as the greater and lesser alar cartilages. There is a narrow strip of cartilage called the vomeronasal cartilage that lies between the vomer and the septal cartilage.

The septal nasal cartilage, extends from the nasal bones in the midline, to the bony part of the septum in the midline, posteriorly. It then passes along the floor of the nasal cavity. The septum is quadrangular–the upper half is attached to the two lateral nasal cartilages, which is fused to the dorsal septum in the midline. The septum is laterally attached, with loose ligaments, to the bony margin of the anterior nasal aperture, while the inferior ends of the lateral cartilages are free (unattached). The three or four minor alar cartilages are adjacent to the lateral cartilages, held in the connective tissue membrane, that connects the lateral cartilages to the frontal process of the maxilla.

The nasal bones in the upper part of the nose are joined by the midline internasal suture. They join with the septal cartilage at a junction known as the rhinion. The rhinion is the midline junction where the nasal bone meets the septal cartilage. From the rhinion to the apex, or tip, the framework is of cartilage.

The major alar cartilages are thin, U-shaped plates of cartilage on each side of the nose that form the lateral and medial walls of the vestibule, known as the medial and lateral crura. The medial crura are attached to the septal cartilage, forming fleshy parts at the front of the nostrils on each side of the septum, called the medial crural footpods. The medial crura meet at the midline below the end of the septum to form the columella and lobule. The lobule contains the tip of the nose and its base contains the nostrils. At the peaks of the folds of the medial crura, they form the alar domes the tip-defining points of the nose, separated by a notch. They then fold outwards, above and to the side of the nostrils forming the lateral crura. The major alar cartilages are freely moveable and can respond to muscles to either open or constrict the nostrils.

There is a reinforcing structure known as the nasal scroll that resists internal collapse from airflow pressure generated by normal breathing. This structure is formed by the junction between the lateral and major cartilages. Their edges interlock by one scrolling upwards and one scrolling inwards.

=== Muscles ===
The muscles of the nose are a subgroup of the facial muscles. They are involved in respiration and facial expression. The muscles of the nose include the procerus, nasalis, depressor septi nasi, levator labii superioris alaeque nasi, and the orbicularis oris of the mouth. As are all of the facial muscles, the muscles of the nose are innervated by the facial nerve and its branches. Although each muscle is independent, the muscles of the nose form a continuous layer with connections between all the components of the muscles and ligaments, in the nasal part of a superficial muscular aponeurotic system (SMAS). The SMAS is continuous from the nasofrontal process to the nasal tip. It divides at level of the nasal valve into superficial and deep layers, each layer having medial and lateral components.

The procerus muscle produces wrinkling over the bridge of the nose, and is active in concentration and frowning. It is a prime target for Botox procedures in the forehead to remove the lines between the eyes.

The nasalis muscle consists of two main parts: a transverse part called the compressor naris, and an alar part termed the dilator naris. The compressor naris muscle compresses the nostrils and may completely close them. The alar part, the dilator naris mainly consists of the dilator naris posterior, and a much smaller dilator naris anterior, and this muscle flares the nostrils. The dilator naris helps to form the upper ridge of the philtrum. The anterior, and the posterior dilator naris, (the alar part of the nasalis muscle), give support to the nasal valves.

The depressor septi nasi may sometimes be absent or rudimentary. The depressor septi pulls the columella, the septum, and the tip of the nose downwards. At the start of inspiration, this muscle tenses the nasal septum and with the dilator naris widens the nostrils.

The levator labii superioris alaeque nasi divides into a medial and a lateral slip. The medial slip blends into the perichondrium of the major alar cartilage and its overlying skin. The lateral slip blends at the side of the upper lip with the levator labii superioris, and with the orbicularis oris. The lateral slip raises the upper lip and deepens and increases the curve above the nasolabial furrow. The medial slip pulls the lateral crus upwards and modifies the curve of the furrow around the alae, and dilates the nostrils.

=== Soft tissue ===
The skin of the nose varies in thickness along its length. From the glabella to the bridge (the nasofrontal angle), the skin is thick, fairly flexible, and mobile. It tapers to the bridge where it is thinnest and least flexible as it is closest to the underlying bone. From the bridge until the tip of the nose the skin is thin. The tip is covered in skin that is as thick as the top section, and has many large sebaceous glands. The thickness of the skin varies but is still separated from the underlying bones and cartilage by four layers – a superficial fatty layer; a fibromuscular layer continued from the SMAS; a deep fatty layer, and the periosteum.

Other areas of soft tissue are found where there is no support from cartilage; these include an area around the sides of the septum – the paraseptal area – an area around the lateral cartilages, an area at the top of the nostril, and an area in the alae.

=== External nose ===
The nasal root is the top of the nose that attaches the nose to the forehead. The nasal root is above the bridge and below the glabella, forming an indentation known as the nasion at the frontonasal suture where the frontal bone meets the nasal bones. The nasal dorsum also known as the nasal ridge is the border between the root and the tip of the nose, which in profile can be variously shaped. The ala of the nose (ala nasi, "wing of the nose"; plural alae) is the lower lateral surface of the external nose, shaped by the alar cartilage and covered in dense connective tissue. The alae flare out to form a rounded eminence around the nostril. Sexual dimorphism is evident in the larger nose of the male. This is due to the increased testosterone that thickens the brow ridge and the bridge of the nose making it wider.

Differences in the symmetry of the nose have been noted in studies. Asymmetry is predominantly seen in wider left-sided nasal and other facial features.

=== Nasal cavity ===
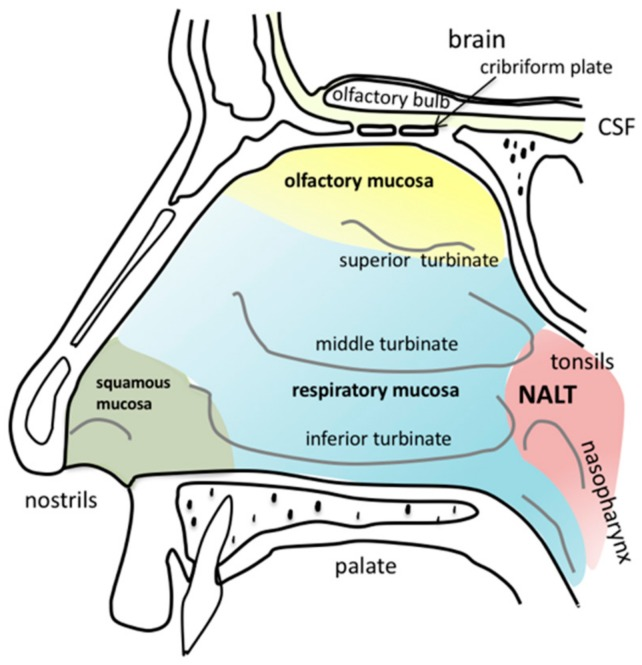
Anatomy of the nasal cavity. Nasal-associated lymphoid tissue labelled NALT

The nasal cavity is the large internal space of the nose, and is in two parts – the nasal vestibule and the nasal cavity proper. The nasal vestibule is the frontmost part of the nasal cavity, enclosed by cartilages. The vestibule is lined with skin, hair follicles, and a large number of sebaceous glands. A mucous ridge known as the limen nasi separates the vestibule from the rest of the nasal cavity and marks the change from the skin of the vestibule to the respiratory epithelium of the rest of the nasal cavity. This area is also known as a mucocutaneous junction and has a dense microvasculature.

The nasal cavity is divided into two cavities by the nasal septum, and each is accessed by an external nostril. The division into two cavities enables the functioning of the nasal cycle that slows down the conditioning process of the inhaled air. At the back of the nasal cavity there are two openings, called choanae (also posterior nostrils), that give entrance to the nasopharynx, and rest of the respiratory tract.

On the outer wall of each cavity are three shell-like bones called conchae, arranged as superior, middle and inferior nasal conchae. Below each concha is a corresponding superior, middle, and inferior nasal meatus, or passage. Sometimes when the superior concha is narrow, a fourth supreme nasal concha is present situated above and sharing the space with the superior concha. The term concha refers to the actual bone; when covered by soft tissue and mucosa, and functioning, a concha is termed a turbinate. Excessive moisture as tears collected in the lacrimal sac travel down the nasolacrimal ducts where they drain into the inferior meatus in the nasal cavity.

Most of the nasal cavity and paranasal sinuses is lined with respiratory epithelium as nasal mucosa. In the roof of each cavity is an area of specialised olfactory epithelium. This region is about 5 cm^{2} (0.78 sq in), covering the superior concha, the cribriform plate, and the nasal septum.

The nasal cavity has a nasal valve area that includes an external nasal valve, and an internal nasal valve. The external nasal valve is bounded medially by the columella, laterally by the lower lateral nasal cartilage, and posteriorly by the nasal sill. The internal nasal valve is bounded laterally by the caudal border of the upper lateral cartilage, medially by the dorsal nasal septum, and inferiorly by the anterior border of the inferior turbinate. The internal nasal valve is the narrowest region of the nasal cavity and is the primary site of nasal resistance. The valves regulate the airflow and resistance. Air breathed in is forced to pass through the narrow internal nasal valve, and then expands as it moves into the nasal cavity. The sudden change in the speed and pressure of the airflow creates turbulence that allows optimum contact with the respiratory epithelium for the necessary warming, moisturising, and filtering. The turbulence also allows movement of the air to pass over the olfactory epithelium and transfer odour information. The angle of the valve between the septum and the sidewall needs to be sufficient for unobstructed airflow, and this is normally between 10 and 15 degrees.

The borders of each nasal cavity are a roof, floor, medial wall (the septum), and lateral wall. The middle part of the roof of the nasal cavity is composed of the horizontal, perforated cribriform plate of the ethmoid bone, through which pass sensory fibres of the olfactory nerve into the cranial cavity.

==== Paranasal sinuses ====
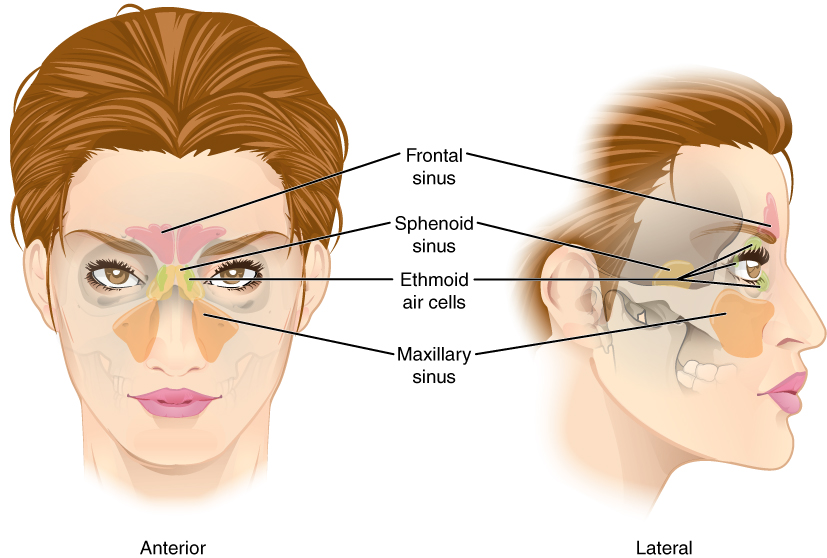
Paranasal sinuses

The mucosa that lines the nasal cavity extends into its chambers, the paranasal sinuses. The nasal cavity and the paranasal sinuses are referred to as the sinonasal tract or sinonasal region, and its anatomy is recognised as being unique and complex. Four paired paranasal sinuses – the frontal sinus, the sphenoid sinus, the ethmoid sinus and the maxillary sinus drain into regions of the nasal cavity. The sinuses are air-filled extensions of the nasal cavity into the cranial bones. The frontal sinuses are located in the frontal bone; the sphenoidal sinuses in the sphenoid bone; the maxillary sinuses in the maxilla; and the ethmoidal sinuses in the ethmoid bone.

A narrow opening called a sinus ostium from each of the paranasal sinuses allows drainage into the nasal cavity. The maxillary sinus is the largest of the sinuses and drains into the middle meatus. Most of the ostia open into the middle meatus and the anterior ethmoid, that together are termed the ostiomeatal complex. Adults have a high concentration of cilia in the ostia. The cilia in the sinuses beat towards the openings into the nasal cavity. The increased numbers of cilia and the narrowness of the sinus openings allow for an increased time for moisturising, and warming.

=== Nose shape ===
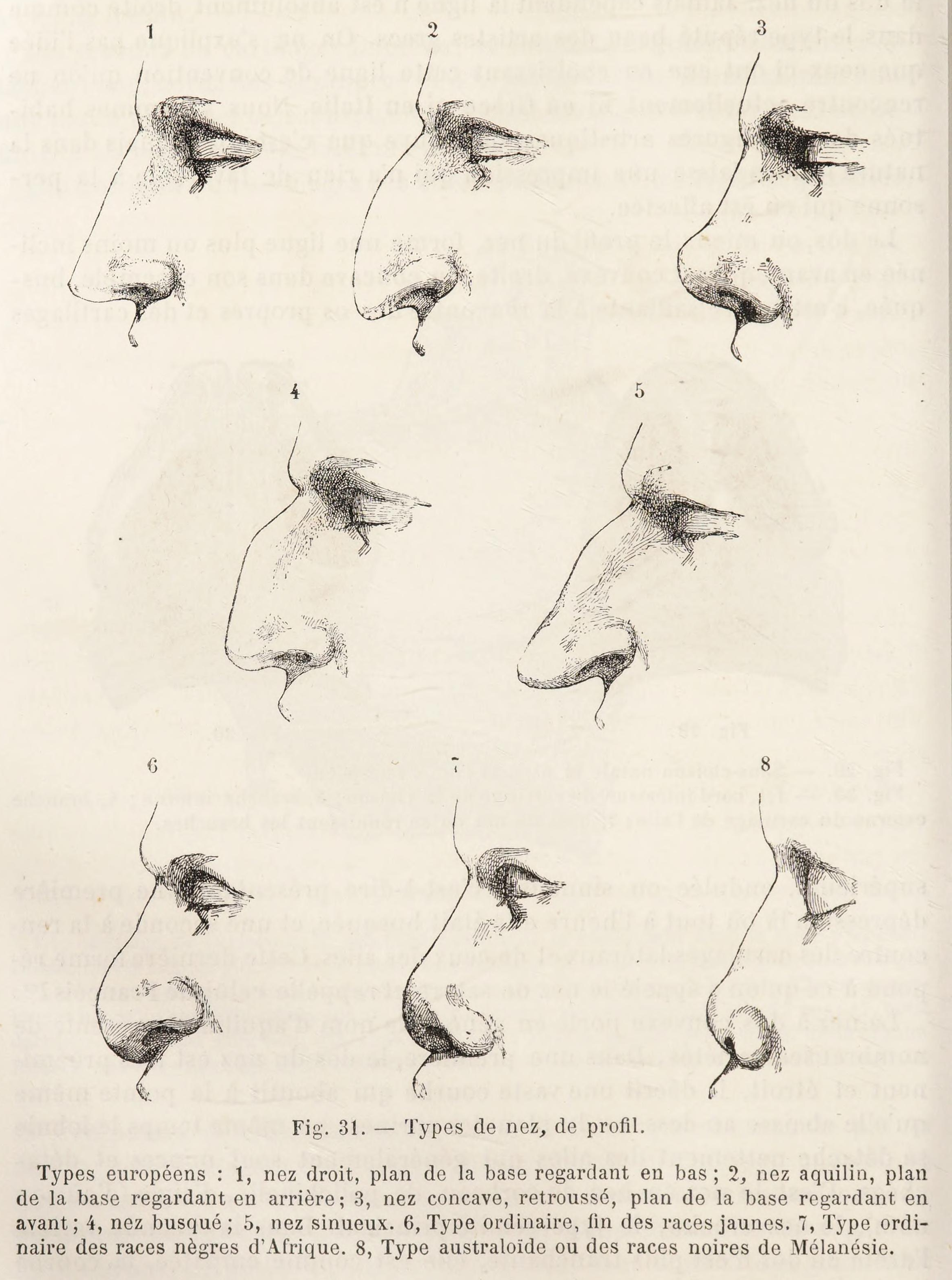
Nose shapes used in Topinard's nasal index

The shape of the nose varies widely due to differences in the nasal bone shapes and formation of the bridge of the nose. Anthropometric studies have importantly contributed to craniofacial surgery, and the nasal index is a recognised anthropometric index used in nasal surgery.

The French anthropologist and physician Paul Topinard developed the nasal index, originally to make statements about race. The index is based on the ratio of the breadth of the nose to its height. Even though there are differences between ethnicities, due to the mixing of the human population the shape of the nose does not define specific populations or races. Variations in nose size between ethnicities may be attributed to differing evolutionary adaptations to local temperatures and humidity. Other factors such as sexual selection may also account for ethnic differences in nose shape.

Some deformities of the nose are named, such as the pug nose and the saddle nose. The pug nose is characterised by excess tissue from the apex that is out of proportion to the rest of the nose. A low and underdeveloped nasal bridge may also be evident. A saddle nose deformity involving the collapse of the bridge of the nose is mostly associated with trauma to the nose but can be caused by other conditions including leprosy.

Werner syndrome, a condition associated with premature aging, causes a "bird-like" appearance due to pinching of the nose.

Down syndrome commonly presents a small nose with a flattened nasal bridge. This can be due to the absence of one or both nasal bones, shortened nasal bones, or nasal bones that have not fused in the midline.

== Blood supply and drainage ==
=== Supply ===
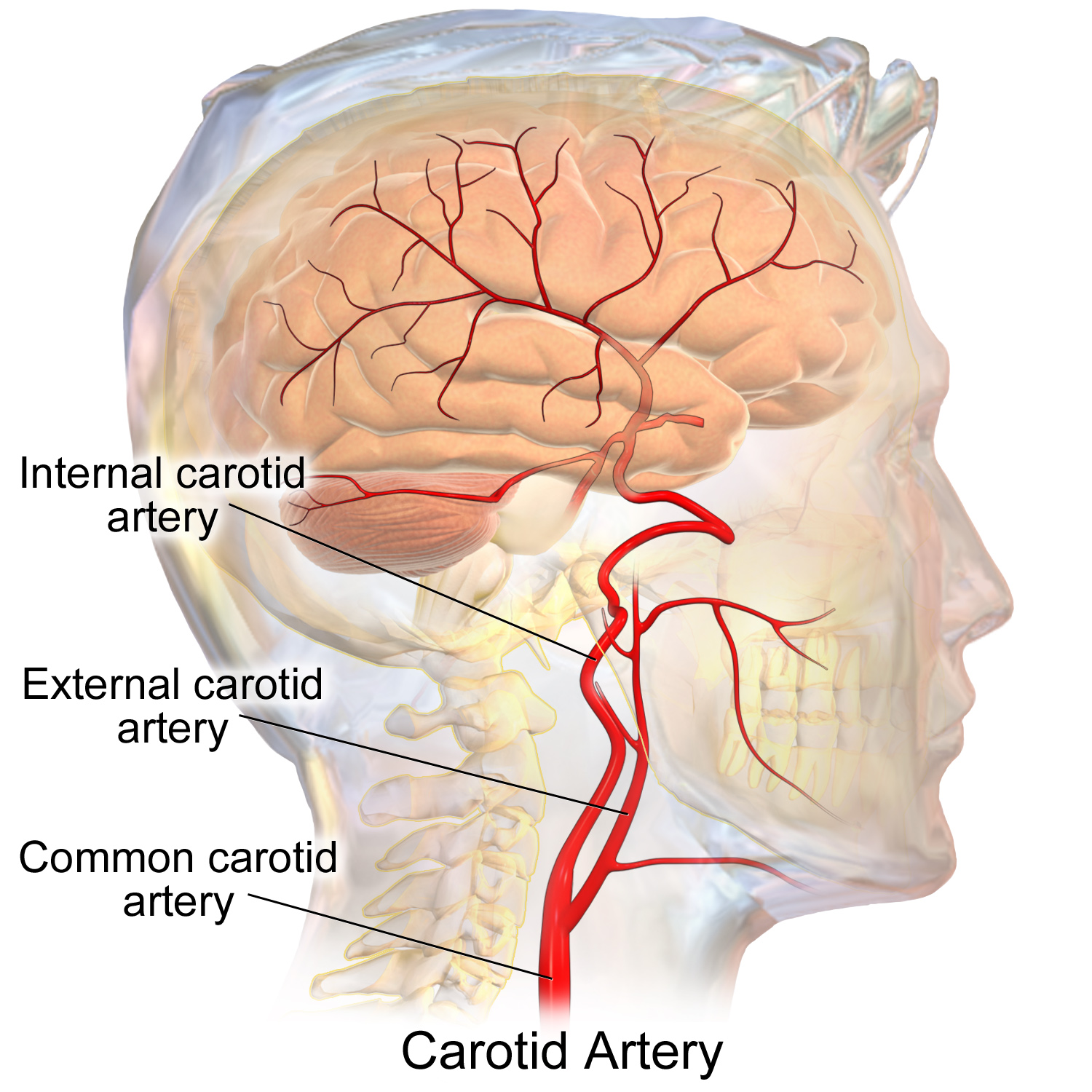
Carotid arteries

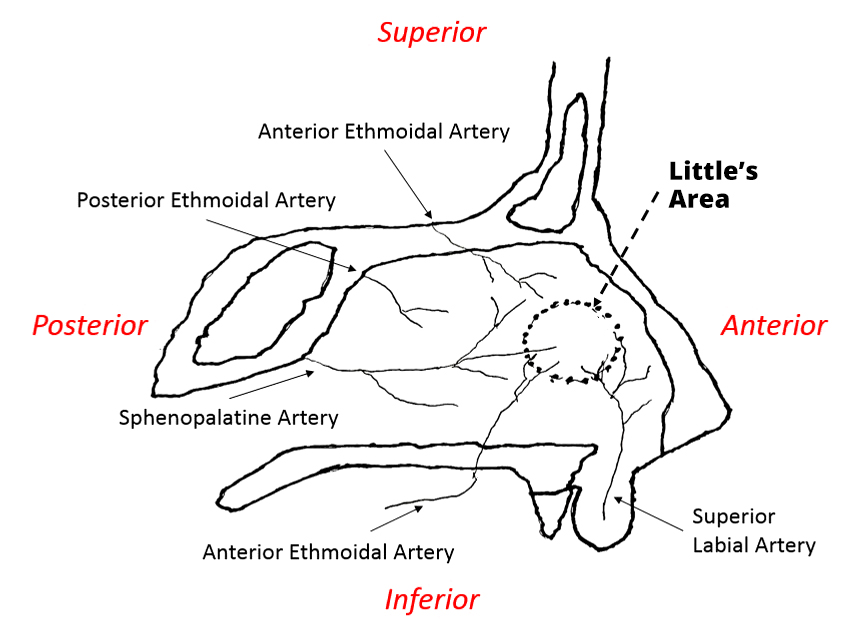
Multiple arteries supply blood to the nose; the nasal septum, shown here is supplied by the anterior and posterior ethmoidal arteries at top; the sphenopalantine artery at the back, and the anterior ethoidal artery and the superior labial artery over the cartilage. These arteries join at Kiesselbach's plexus.

The blood supply to the nose is provided by branches of the ophthalmic, maxillary, and facial arteries – branches of the carotid arteries. Branches of these arteries anastomose to form plexuses in and under the nasal mucosa. In the septal region Kiesselbach's plexus is a common site of nosebleeds.

Branches of the ophthalmic artery – the anterior and posterior ethmoidal arteries supply the roof, upper bony septum, and ethmoidal and frontal sinuses. The anterior ethmoidal artery also helps to supply the lower septal cartilage. Another branch is the dorsal nasal artery a terminal branch that supplies the skin of the alae and dorsum.

Branches of the maxillary artery include the greater palatine artery; the sphenopalatine artery and its branches – the posterior lateral nasal arteries and posterior septal nasal branches; the pharyngeal branch; and the infraorbital artery and its branches – the superior anterior and posterior alveolar arteries.

The sphenopalatine artery and the ethmoid arteries supply the outer walls of the nasal cavity. There is additional supply from a branch of the facial artery – the superior labial artery. The sphenopalantine artery is the artery primarily responsible for supplying the nasal mucosa.

The skin of the alae is supplied by the septal and lateral nasal branches of the facial artery. The skin of the outer parts of the alae and the dorsum of the nose are supplied by the dorsal nasal artery a branch of the ophthalmic artery, and the infraorbital branch of the maxillary arteries.

=== Drainage ===
Veins of the nose include the angular vein that drains the side of the nose, receiving lateral nasal veins from the alae. The angular vein joins with the superior labial vein. Some small veins from the dorsum of the nose drain to the nasal arch of the frontal vein at the root of the nose.

In the posterior region of the cavity, specifically in the posterior part of the inferior meatus is a venous plexus known as Woodruff's plexus. This plexus is made up of large thin-walled veins with little soft tissue such as muscle or fiber. The mucosa of the plexus is thin with very few structures.

== Lymphatic drainage ==
From different areas of the nose superficial lymphatic vessels run with the veins, and deep lymphatic vessels travel with the arteries. Lymph drains from the anterior half of the nasal cavity, including both the medial and lateral walls, to join that of the external nasal skin to drain into the submandibular lymph nodes. The rest of the nasal cavity and paranasal sinuses all drain to the upper deep cervical lymph nodes, either directly or through the retropharyngeal lymph nodes. The back of the nasal floor probably drains to the parotid lymph nodes.

== Nerve supply ==
The nerve supply to the nose and paranasal sinuses comes from two branches of the trigeminal nerve (CN V): the ophthalmic nerve (CN V_{1}), the maxillary nerve (CN V_{2}), and branches from these.

In the nasal cavity, the nasal mucosa is divided in terms of nerve supply into a back lower part (posteroinferior), and a frontal upper part (anterosuperior). The posterior part is supplied by a branch of the maxillary nerve – the nasopalatine nerve, which reaches the septum. Lateral nasal branches of the greater palatine nerve supply the lateral wall.

The frontal upper part is supplied from a branch of the ophthalmic nerve – the nasociliary nerve, and its branches – the anterior and posterior ethmoidal nerves.

Most of the external nose – the dorsum, and the apex are supplied by the infratrochlear nerve, (a branch of the nasociliary nerve). The external branch of the anterior ethmoidal nerve also supplies areas of skin between the root and the alae.

The alae of the nose are supplied by nasal branches of CN V_{2}, the infraorbital nerve, and internal nasal branches of infraorbital nerve that supply the septum and the vestibule.

The maxillary sinus is supplied by superior alveolar nerves from the maxillary and infraorbital nerves. The frontal sinus is supplied by branches of the supraorbital nerve. The ethmoid sinuses are supplied by anterior and posterior ethmoid branches of the nasociliary nerve. The sphenoid sinus is supplied by the posterior ethmoidal nerves.

=== Movement ===
The muscles of the nose are supplied by branches of the facial nerve. The nasalis muscle is supplied by the buccal branches. It may also be supplied by one of the zygomatic branches. The procerus is supplied by temporal branches of the facial nerve and lower zygomatic branches; a supply from the buccal branch has also been described. The depressor septi is innervated by the buccal branch, and sometimes by the zygomatic branch, of the facial nerve. The levator labii superioris alaeque nasi is innervated by zygomatic and superior buccal branches of the facial nerve.

=== Smell ===
The sense of smell is transmitted by the olfactory nerves. Olfactory nerves are bundles of very small unmyelinated axons that are derived from olfactory receptor neurons in the olfactory mucosa. The axons are in varying stages of maturity, reflecting the constant turnover of neurons in the olfactory epithelium. A plexiform network is formed in the lamina propria, by the bundles of axons that are surrounded by olfactory ensheathing cells. In as many as twenty branches, the bundled axons cross the cribriform plate and enter the overlying olfactory bulb ending as glomeruli. Each branch is enclosed by an outer dura mater that becomes continuous with the nasal periosteum.

=== Autonomic supply ===
The nasal mucosa in the nasal cavity is also supplied by the autonomic nervous system. Postganglionic nerve fibers from the deep petrosal nerve join with preganglionic nerve fibers from the greater petrosal nerve to form the nerve of the pterygoid canal. Sympathetic postganglionic fibers are distributed to the blood vessels of the nose. Postganglionic parasympathetic fibres derived from the pterygopalatine ganglion provide the secretomotor supply to the nasal mucous glands, and are distributed via branches of the maxillary nerves.

== Development ==
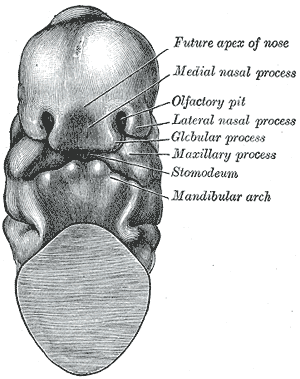
The developing head at about four weeks. The olfactory pit can be seen at the top.

=== Development of the nose ===
In the early development of the embryo, neural crest cells migrate to form the mesenchymal tissue as ectomesenchyme of the pharyngeal arches. By the end of the fourth week, the first pair of pharyngeal arches form five facial prominences or processes – an unpaired frontonasal process, paired mandibular processes and paired maxillary processes. The nose is largely formed by the fusion of these five facial prominences. The frontonasal process gives rise to the bridge of the nose. The medial nasal processes provide the crest and the tip of the nose, and the lateral nasal processes form the alae or sides of the nose. The frontonasal process is a proliferation of mesenchyme in front of the brain vesicles, and makes up the upper border of the stomadeum.

During the fifth week, the maxillary processes increase in size and at the same time the ectoderm of the frontonasal process becomes thickened at its sides and also increases in size, forming the nasal placodes. The nasal placodes are also known as the olfactory placodes. This development is induced by the ventral part of the forebrain. In the sixth week, the ectoderm in each nasal placode invaginates to form an indented oval-shaped pit, which forms a surrounding raised ridge of tissue. Each nasal pit forms a division between the ridges, into a lateral nasal process on the outer edge, and a medial nasal process on the inner edge.

In the sixth week, the nasal pits deepen as they penetrate into the underlying mesenchyme. At this time, the medial nasal processes migrate towards each other and fuse forming the primordium of the bridge of the nose and the septum. The migration is helped by the increased growth of the maxillary prominences medially, which compresses the medial nasal processes towards the midline. Their merging takes place at the surface, and also at a deeper level. The merge forms the intermaxillary segment, and this is continuous with the rostral part of the nasal septum. The tips of the maxillary processes also grow and fuse with the intermaxillary process. The intermaxillary process gives rise to the philtrum of the upper lip.

At the end of the sixth week, the nasal pits have deepened further and they fuse to make a large ectodermal nasal sac. This sac will be above and to the back of the intermaxillary process. Leading into the seventh week, the nasal sac floor and posterior wall grow to form a thickened plate-like ectodermal structure called the nasal fin. The nasal fin separates the sac from the oral cavity. Within the fin, vacuoles develop that fuse with the nasal sac. This enlarges the nasal sac and at the same time thins the fin to a membrane – the oronasal membrane that separates the nasal pits from the oral cavity. During the seventh week the oronasal membrane ruptures and disintegrates to form an opening – the single primitive choana. The intermaxillary segment extends posteriorly to form the primary palate, which makes up the floor of the nasal cavity. During the eighth and ninth weeks, a pair of thin extensions form from the medial walls of the maxillary process. These extensions are called the palatine shelves that form the secondary palate. The secondary palate will endochondrally ossify to form the hard palate – the end-stage floor of the nasal cavity. During this time, ectoderm and mesoderm of the frontonasal process produce the midline septum. The septum grows down from the roof of the nasal cavity and fuses with the developing palates along the midline. The septum divides the nasal cavity into two nasal passages opening into the pharynx through the definitive choanae.

At ten weeks, the cells differentiate into muscle, cartilage, and bone. Problems at this stage of development can cause birth defects such as choanal atresia (absent or closed passage), facial clefts and nasal dysplasia (faulty or incomplete development) or extremely rarely polyrrhinia the formation of a duplicate nose.

Normal development is critical because the newborn infant breathes through the nose for the first six weeks, and any nasal blockage will need emergency treatment to clear.

=== Development of the paranasal sinuses ===
The four pairs of paranasal sinuses – the maxillary, ethmoid, sphenoid, and frontal, develop from the nasal cavity as invaginations extending into their named bones. Two pairs of sinuses form during prenatal development and two pairs form after birth. The maxillary sinuses are the first to appear during the fetal third month. They slowly expand within the maxillary bones and continue to expand throughout childhood. The maxillary sinuses form as invaginations from the nasal sac. The ethmoid sinuses appear in the fetal fifth month as invaginations of the middle meatus. The ethmoid sinuses do not grow into the ethmoid bone and do not completely develop until puberty.

The sphenoid sinuses are extensions of the ethmoid sinuses into the sphenoid bones. They begin to develop around two years of age, and continue to enlarge during childhood.

The frontal sinuses only develop in the fifth or sixth year of childhood, and continue expanding throughout adolescence. Each frontal sinus is made up of two independent spaces that develop from two different sources; one from the expansion of ethmoid sinuses into frontal bone, and the other develops from invagination. They never coalesce so drain independently.

== Function ==
=== Respiration ===
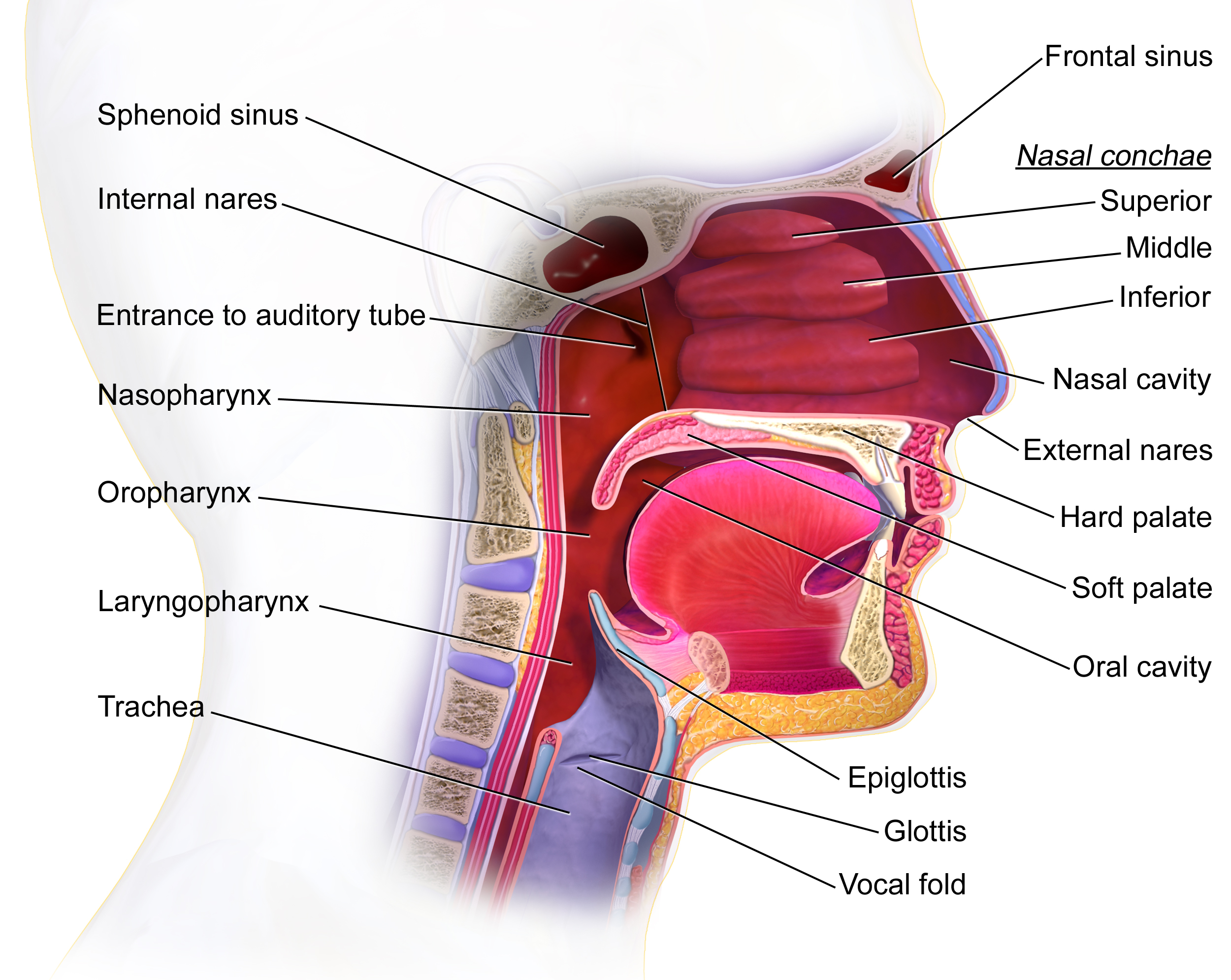
Air enters the upper respiratory tract through the nose. The nasal conchae can be seen in this image.

The nose is the first organ of the upper respiratory tract in the respiratory system. Its main respiratory function is the supply and conditioning, by warming, moisturising and filtering of particulates of inhaled air. Nasal hair in the nostrils traps large particles preventing their entry into the lungs.

The three positioned nasal conchae in each cavity provide four grooves as air passages, along which the air is circulated and moved to the nasopharynx. The internal structures and cavities, including the conchae and paranasal sinuses form an integrated system for the conditioning of the air breathed in through the nose. This functioning also includes the major role of the nasal mucosa, and the resulting conditioning of the air before it reaches the lungs is important in maintaining the internal environment and proper functioning of the lungs. The turbulence created by the conchae and meatuses optimises the warming, moistening, and filtering of the mucosa. A major protective role is thereby provided by these structures of the upper respiratory tract, in the passage of air to the more delicate structures of the lower respiratory tract.

Sneezing is an important protective reflex action initiated by irritation of the nasal mucosa to expel unwanted particles through the mouth and nose. Photic sneezing is a reflex brought on by different stimuli such as bright lights. The nose is also able to provide sense information as to the temperature of the air being breathed.

Variations in shape of the nose have been hypothesised to possibly be adaptive to regional differences in temperature and humidity, though they may also have been driven by other factors such as sexual selection.

=== Sense of smell ===
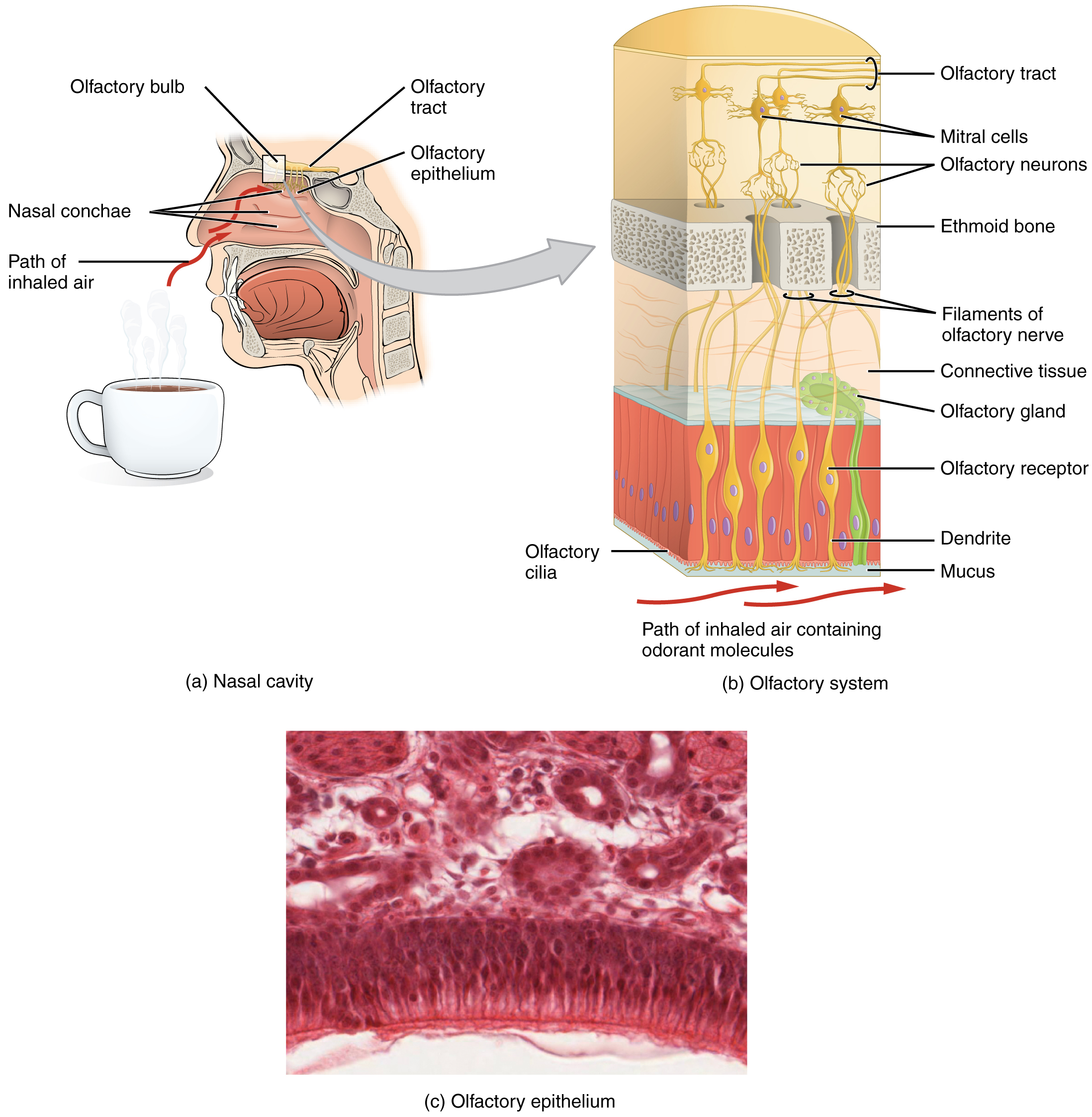
The cells lining the nose involved in smell (olfaction) are shown here

The nose also plays the major part in the olfactory system. It contains an area of specialised cells, olfactory receptor neurons responsible for the sense of smell (olfaction). Olfactory mucosa in the upper nasal cavity, contains a type of nasal gland called olfactory glands or Bowman's glands, which help in olfaction. The nasal conchae also help in olfaction function, by directing air-flow to the olfactory region.

=== Speech ===
Speech is produced with pressure from the lungs. This can be modified using airflow through the nose in a process called nasalisation. This involves the lowering of the soft palate to produce nasal vowels and consonants by allowing air to escape from both the nose and the mouth. Nasal airflow is also used to produce a variety of click consonants called nasal clicks. The large, hollow cavities of the paranasal sinuses act as resonating chambers that modify, and amplify speech and other vocal vibrations passing through them.

== Clinical significance ==
One of the most common medical conditions involving the nose is a nosebleed (epistaxis). Most nosebleeds occur in Kiesselbach's plexus, a vascular plexus in the lower front part of the septum involving the convergence of four arteries. A smaller proportion of nosebleeds that tend to be nontraumatic occur in Woodruff's plexus. Woodruff's plexus is a venous plexus of large thin-walled veins lying in the posterior part of the inferior meatus.

Another common condition is nasal congestion, usually a symptom of infection, particularly sinusitis, or other inflammation of the nasal lining called rhinitis, including allergic rhinitis and nonallergic rhinitis. Chronic nasal obstruction resulting in breathing through the mouth can greatly impair or prevent the nostrils from flaring. One of the causes of snoring is nasal obstruction, and anti-snoring devices such as a nasal strip help to flare the nostrils and keep the airway open. Nasal flaring, is usually seen in children when breathing is difficult. Most conditions of nasal congestion also cause a loss of the sense of smell (anosmia). This may also occur in other conditions, for example following trauma, in Kallmann syndrome or Parkinson's disease. A blocked sinus ostium, an opening from a paranasal sinus, will cause fluid to accumulate in the sinus.

In children, the nose is a common site of foreign bodies. The nose is one of the exposed areas that is susceptible to frostbite.

Because of the special nature of the blood supply to the human nose and surrounding area, it is possible for retrograde infections from the nasal area to spread to the brain. For this reason, the area from the corners of the mouth to the bridge of the nose, including the nose and maxilla, is known as the danger triangle of the face.

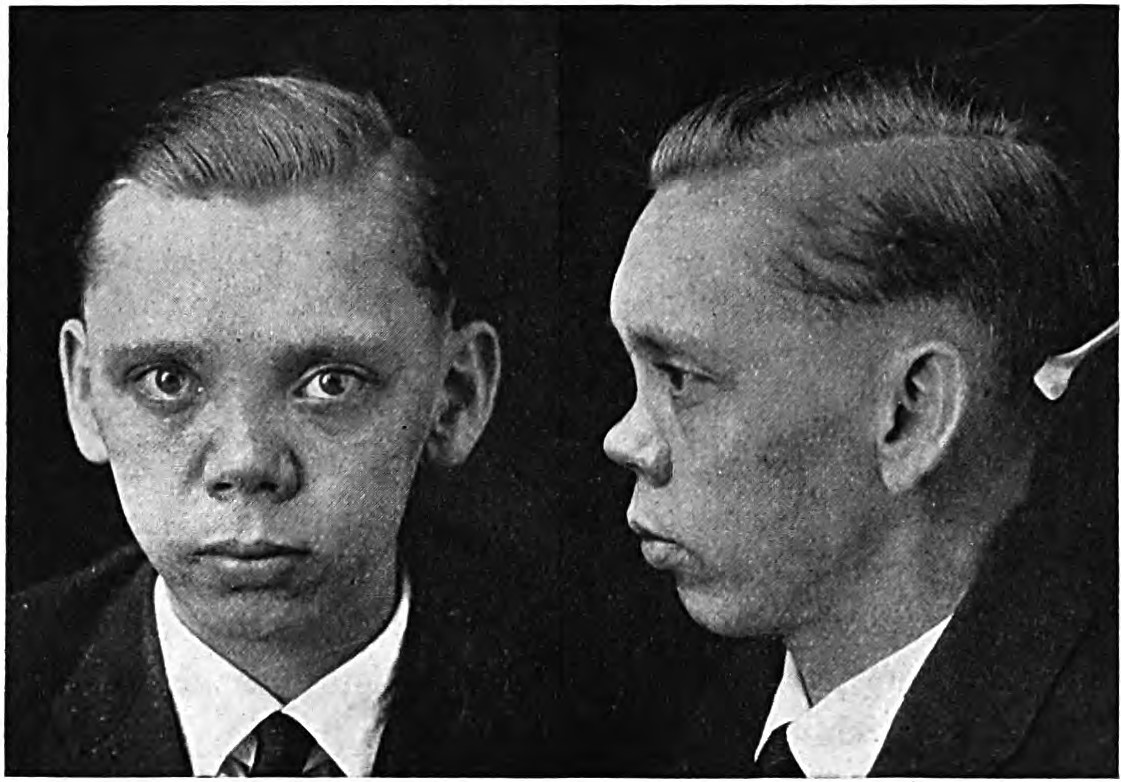
Saddle nose (congenital syphilis)

Infections or other conditions that may result in destruction of, or damage to a part of the nose include rhinophyma, skin cancers particularly basal-cell carcinoma, paranasal sinus and nasal cavity cancer, granulomatosis with polyangiitis, syphilis, leprosy, recreational use of cocaine, chromium and other toxins. The nose may be stimulated to grow in acromegaly, a condition caused by an excess of growth hormone.

A common anatomic variant is an air-filled cavity within a concha known as a concha bullosa. In rare cases a polyp can form inside a bullosa. Usually a concha bullosa is small and without symptoms but when large can cause obstruction to sinus drainage.

Some drugs can be nasally administered, including drug delivery to the brain, and these include nasal sprays and topical treatments. The septal cartilage can be destroyed through the repeated inhalation of recreational drugs such as cocaine. This, in turn, can lead to more widespread collapse of the nasal skeleton.

Sneezing can transmit infections carried in the expelled droplets. This route is called either airborne transmission or aerosol transmission.

=== Surgical procedures ===
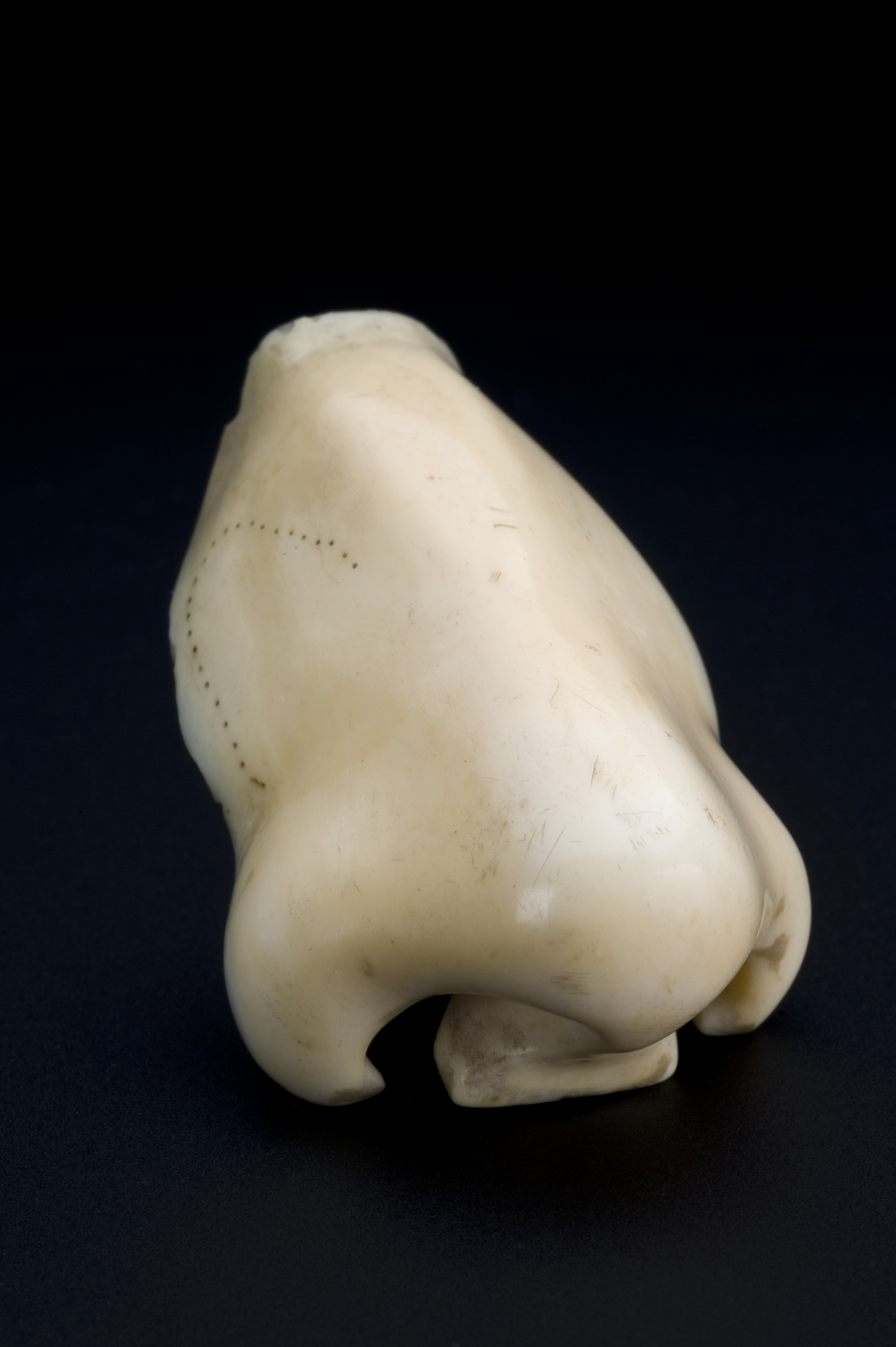
Prosthetic nose from 17th century Europe.

Badly positioned alar cartilages lack proper support, and can affect the function of the external nasal valve. This can cause breathing problems particularly during deep inhalation. The surgical procedure to correct breathing problems due to disorders in the nasal structures is called a rhinoplasty, and this is also the procedure used for a cosmetic surgery when it is commonly called a "nose job". For surgical procedures of rhinoplasty, the nose is mapped out into a number of subunits and segments. This uses nine aesthetic nasal subunits and six aesthetic nasal segments. A septoplasty is the specific surgery to correct a nasal septum deviation.

A broken nose can result from trauma. Minor fractures may heal on their own. Surgery known as reduction may be carried out on more severe breaks that cause dislocation.

Several nasal procedures of the nose and paranasal sinuses can be carried out using minimally-invasive nasal endoscopy. These procedures aim to restore sinus ventilation, mucociliary clearance, and maintain the health of the sinus mucosa.

Some non-nasal surgeries can also be carried out through the use of an endoscope that is entered through the nose. These endoscopic endonasal surgeries are used to remove tumours from the front of the base of the skull.

Swollen conchae can cause obstruction and nasal congestion, and may be treated surgically by a turbinectomy.

== Society and culture ==
Some people choose to have cosmetic surgery (called a rhinoplasty) to change the appearance of their nose. Nose piercings, such as in the nostril, septum, or bridge, are also common. In certain Asian countries such as China, Japan, South Korea, Malaysia, Thailand and Bangladesh, rhinoplasties are commonly carried out to create a more developed nose bridge or a "high nose". Similarly, "DIY nose lifts" in the form of re-usable cosmetic items have become popular and are sold in many Asian countries such as China, Japan, South Korea, Taiwan, Sri Lanka and Thailand. A high-bridged nose has been a common beauty ideal in many Asian cultures dating back to the beauty ideals of ancient China and India.

In New Zealand, nose pressing ("hongi") is a traditional greeting originating among the Māori people. However it is now generally confined to certain traditional celebrations.

The Mimizuka monument enshrines the mutilated noses of at least 38,000 Koreans killed during the Japanese invasions of Korea from 1592 to 1598.

Nose picking is a common, mildly taboo habit. Medical risks include the spread of infections, nosebleeds and, rarely, perforation of the nasal septum. When it becomes compulsive it is termed rhinotillexomania. The wiping of the nose with the hand, commonly referred to as the "allergic salute", is also mildly taboo and can result in the spreading of infections as well. Habitual as well as fast or rough nose wiping may also result in a crease (known as a transverse nasal crease or groove) running across the nose, and can lead to permanent physical deformity observable in childhood and adulthood.

Nose fetishism (or nasophilia) is the sexual partialism for the nose.

== Neanderthals ==
Clive Finlayson of the Gibraltar Museum said the large Neanderthal noses were an adaptation to the cold, Todd C. Rae of the American Museum of Natural History said primate and arctic animal studies have shown sinus size reduction in areas of extreme cold rather than enlargement in accordance with Allen's rule. Therefore, Todd C. Rae concludes that the design of the large and wide Neanderthal nose was evolved for the hotter climate of the Middle East and Africa and remained unchanged when they entered Europe.

Miquel Hernández of the Department of Animal Biology at the University of Barcelona said the "high and narrow nose of Eskimos and Neanderthals" is an "adaptation to a cold and dry environment", since it contributes to warming and moisturizing the air and the "recovery of heat and moisture from expired air".

== See also ==
- Dried nasal mucus
- Empty nose syndrome, a nose crippled by excessive resection of the inferior and/or middle turbinates of the nose
- Nasothek
- Neti (Hatha Yoga), an Ayurvedic technique of nasal cleansing
- Obligate nasal breathing
- Sròn, the Scottish Gaelic word for nose and the name of some hills in the Scottish Highlands
