= Nasal cartilages =

Supportive structures in the nose

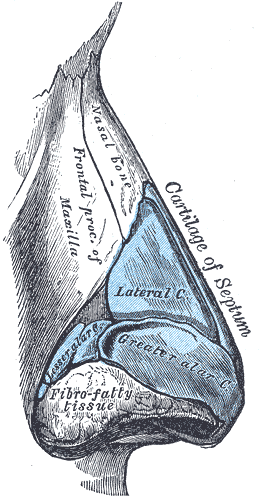
- Cartilages of the nose. Side view. (Greater alar cartilage visible in blue at center right.)

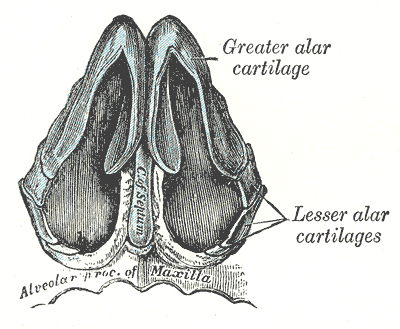
- Cartilages of the nose, seen from below.

Details

Identifiers
- Latin: cartilagines nasi
- MeSH: D055171
- TA98: A06.1.01.006
- TA2: 939
- FMA: 59502

The nasal cartilages are structures within the nose that provide form and support to the nasal cavity. The nasal cartilages are made up of a flexible material called hyaline cartilage (packed collagen) in the distal portion of the nose. There are five individual cartilages that make up the nasal cavity: septal nasal cartilage, lateral nasal cartilage, major alar cartilage (greater alar cartilage, or cartilage of the aperture), minor alar cartilage (lesser alar cartilage, sesamoid, or accessory cartilage), and vomeronasal cartilage (Jacobson's cartilage).

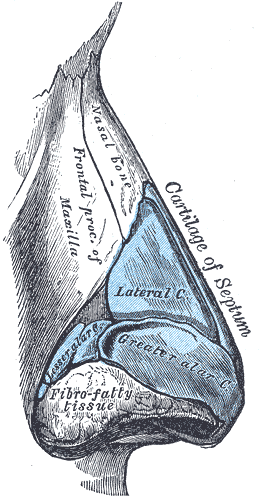
Side view of the cartilages in the nose.

The nasal cartilages associate with other cartilage structures of the nose or with bones of the facial skeleton. These associations create vent-like structures within the nose so that air can flow from the nasal cavity to the lungs or vice versa. Therefore, the nasal cartilages are structures that aid the body in respiratory functions to intake oxygen or expire carbon dioxide.

Abnormalities or defects in the nasal cartilages affect airflow through the nasal cavity, resulting in respiratory issues. Surgical techniques have been produced to adjust the position or repair the nasal cartilages so that maximal airflow is once again accomplished. Some of these surgical techniques include: septoplasty (restructuring the septal nasal cartilage), upper lateral cartilage repositioning (restructuring the lateral nasal cartilage), and sliding alar cartilage (restructuring the major alar cartilage). Rhinoplasty, which is the surgical reconstruction of the nose, has increased in recent popularity for functional and social purposes.

Other mammals also contain nasal cartilages in order to maintain structure and function for the nasal cavity. The orientation of the nasal cartilages can produce different shapes and sizes of the nostrils and nasal cavities. For the most part, animals contain similar cartilage structures within the nose but vary in the number of different cartilage structures they have. Donkeys, buffalo, and camels have a variety of cartilage structures that are analogous to humans but they all lack septal nasal cartilages. Instead, they have multiple components merging to form the nasal septum. Even though nasal cartilages differ between species, they all aid in the function of the respiratory system.

== Structure and function ==
=== Septal nasal cartilage ===
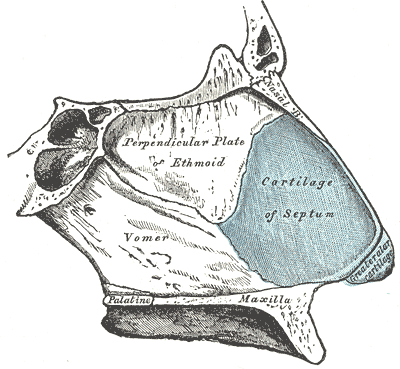
Right side view of the septal nasal cartilage.

The septal nasal cartilage is a flat, quadrilateral piece of hyaline cartilage that separates both nasal cavities from one another. The septal nasal cartilage fits in a place between the perpendicular plate of the ethmoid and vomer bones while also being covered by an internal mucous membrane. The superior portion of the septal nasal cartilage attaches to the nasal bones, while the inferior portion attaches to the alar cartilages via fibrous tissues. The septal nasal cartilage separates both right and left nasal cavities, which allows air to pass through them. Providing two cavities generates turbulence within the tight spaces, allowing air to flow quicker bidirectionally. The septal nasal cartilage is also the main structure that provides the orientation of the nose, being the midline structure of the organ. With an offset septal nasal cartilage, the nose will appear crooked to the viewer. A crooked nose can block airflow coming from the nares to the lungs or vice versa. This can lead to respiratory issues due to low oxygen but high carbon dioxide counts within the body. A surgical procedure to correct this issue is called septoplasty.

=== Lateral nasal cartilage ===
The lateral nasal cartilage is a wing-like expansion extending out from the septal nasal cartilage. The lateral nasal cartilage lies inferiorly to the nasal bones while sitting superiorly to the major alar cartilage, separated by a narrow fissure. The lateral nasal cartilage and major alar cartilage curl up upon interaction with one another, forming a tight connection through fibrous tissues. Like the septal nasal cartilage, the lateral nasal cartilage is composed of hyaline cartilage. Hyaline cartilage provides form and flexibility within a specific structure.

The superior portion of the lateral nasal cartilage fuses with the septum to provide support within the nasal cavities. With a collapse of the lateral nasal cartilage, the inner nasal valve could become obstructed and prevent the movement of airflow throughout. A new surgical technique to reposition the lateral nasal cartilage has been constructed to relieve the site of obstruction within the inner nasal valve and regain maximal airflow throughout the nose (upper lateral cartilage repositioning).

=== Major alar cartilage ===
The major alar cartilages are positioned with one structure on each side of the nasal tip. Superiorly, the major alar cartilages are connected to the lateral nasal cartilage via fibrous tissues. Composed of hyaline cartilage, these structures are very thin and folded to form the lateral and medial crus. The medial crus is the inner portion of the major alar cartilages that are situated perpendicularly to the septal nasal cartilage. The lateral crus is the outer portion of the major alar cartilages that associate with the ala of the nose.

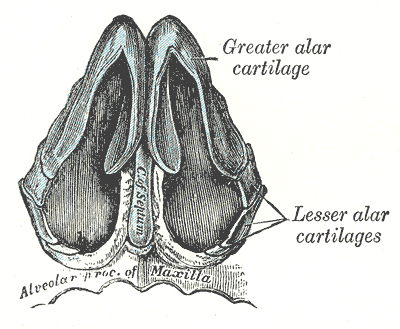
Major alar and minor alar cartilages, seen from below.

Both crus come together to form an oval tip at each nostril. Both sides of the major alar cartilages merge to form a notch at the tip, which is referred to as the apex of the nose. With the formation of the medial and lateral walls within the nares, the major alar cartilages function to hold open each naris. This allows maximal airflow to reach the nasal valve, allowing optimal respiration. Due to weakness corresponding with the lateral crus in certain individuals, a technique called sliding alar cartilage (SAC) has been a procedure practiced to restructure and support the nasal tip.

=== Minor alar cartilage ===
The minor alar cartilages are 3 to 4 small hyaline cartilage pieces on both sides of the nose that sit between the lateral nasal cartilage and the major alar cartilage. Associated within the ala of the nose, these small structures are contained within the most dorsal part of the ala. Also known by its other name, "accessory cartilage", these structures aid to provide form and strength at the base of the nares in conjunction with the major alar cartilage.

=== Vomeronasal cartilage ===
The vomeronasal cartilage is a thin piece of hyaline cartilage that attaches to the vomer and extends to the septal nasal cartilage. This structure is associated with the vomeronasal organ, which is part of the accessory olfactory system. This associated organ plays an important role in the sense of smell by being lined with similar epithelium to that of the olfactory region of the nose. The vomeronasal cartilage is another small component of the nose that provides strength and structure.

== Reconstruction ==
With emerging technological advancements, reconstruction and surgical techniques have been developed to adjust the lifestyle and health of individuals. Rhinoplasty is one of the surgical practices that has become more common in the modern era. Some rhinoplastic procedures include septoplasty, sliding alar cartilage, and upper lateral cartilage repositioning. These procedures aid in cosmetic as well as functional issues involving the nose. Other reconstruction procedures are being produced and tested as the knowledge for nasal cartilages increase.

=== Septoplasty ===
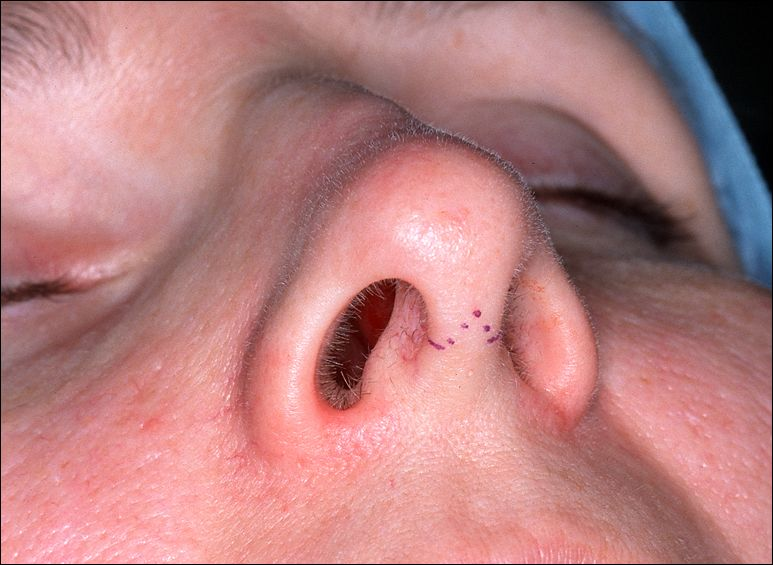
External incision used during a rhinoplasty

Septoplasty is a surgical procedure that straightens the septal nasal cartilage within the center of the nose. With a crooked septum, it is more difficult for an individual to breathe and the risk for getting a sinus infection increases. Also called a deviated septum, a crooked nose will block one or both sides of the nose, affecting the quality of life. However, a deviated septum is very common and does not always create respiratory issues. Respiratory issues usually occur in more severe cases, requiring surgery to repair. Surgery is also permitted to individuals that seek cosmetic changes due to moderate cases of a deviated septum. Surgery may require a surgeon to cut and remove parts of the septal nasal cartilages, replacing them later in a reconstructed format. This will allow the individual to receive more airflow through the nostrils when the surgery fully heals after 3 to 6 months. However, there are some risks correlated with this surgical procedure. These risks include a change in the shape of the nose, excessive bleeding, vacant space in the septum, trouble smelling, blood clots that need to be removed, and numbness by the facial region. Smoking can also cause further damage during the healing process of septoplastic surgery.

=== Upper lateral cartilage repositioning ===
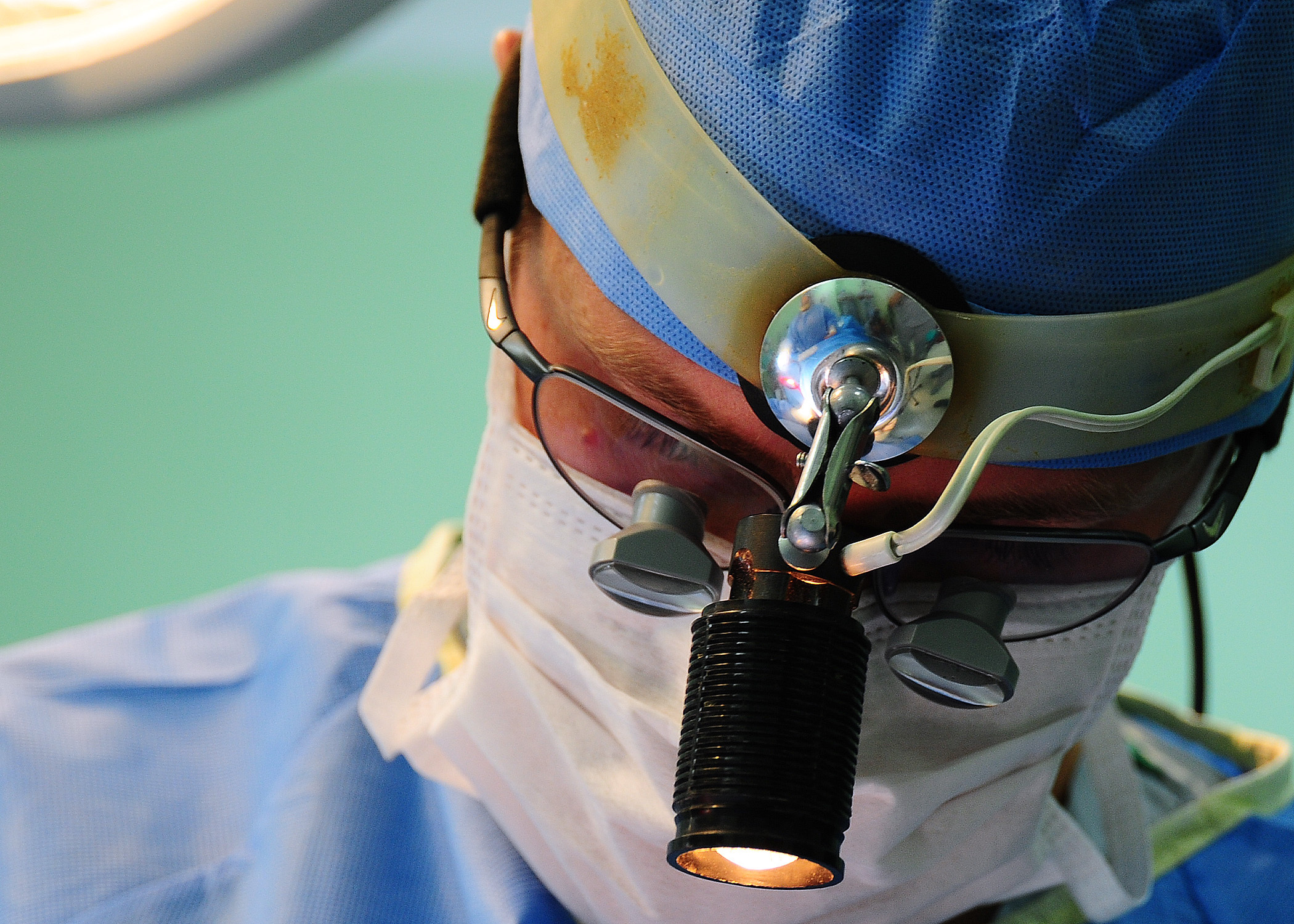
Surgeon in scrubs performing a septoplasty

The upper lateral cartilage repositioning procedure is done to move the lateral nasal cartilage from blocking the nasal valve. The nasal valve is the smallest airway within the nose and is a common site for obstruction. Other surgical procedures open up this air way by employing grafts to separate the septal nasal and lateral nasal cartilages from one another. Grafts need to be used permanently due to the complications of removing such a device. The upper lateral cartilage repositioning technique deploys a temporary stint that repositions the lateral nasal cartilage, lets it heal/be stationary due to scar tissue formation, then is removed. This open rhinoplastic procedure allows the nose to heal to an optimal position without the permanent use of man-made hardware. This procedure is just one way to resolve issues involving lateral nasal cartilage deformities. Other procedures are being produced and improved upon in order to generate the simplest and most safe surgical procedure.

=== Sliding alar cartilage (SAC) ===
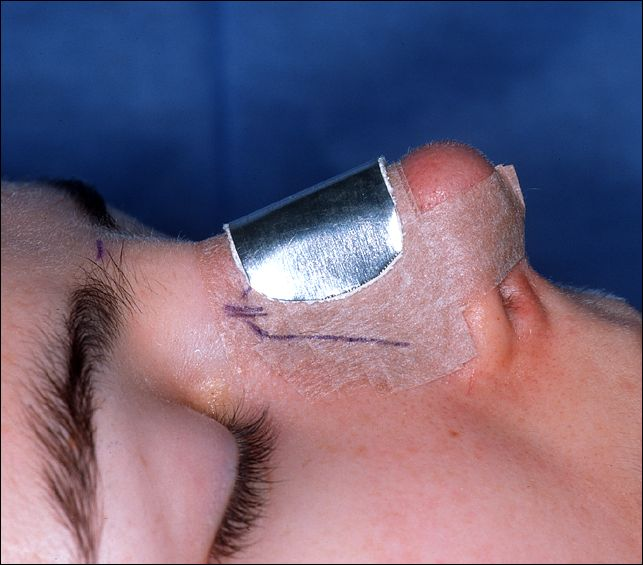
Patient with metal split after a rhinoplastic procedure.

The sliding alar cartilage is a procedure to strengthen and support the nasal tip. This medical practice is completed on the greater alar cartilage in order to reshape this structure. The greater alar cartilages can become very weak or have deformities, creating respiratory issues. Other medical procedures that reshape the greater alar cartilages use grafts or cartilage re-sectioning. The SAC procedure is completed within two to three minutes. In that timeframe, the tip of the nose is cut open, the greater alar cartilage is manipulated to preserve the scroll area, providing strength and structure, then the incision is sutured back up. This simple technique creates tip definition while maintaining airway function. While there are other procedures to strengthen the greater alar cartilage, the SAC procedure is gaining momentum into common rhinoplastic operations.
