= Piriform aperture =

Opening in the human skull

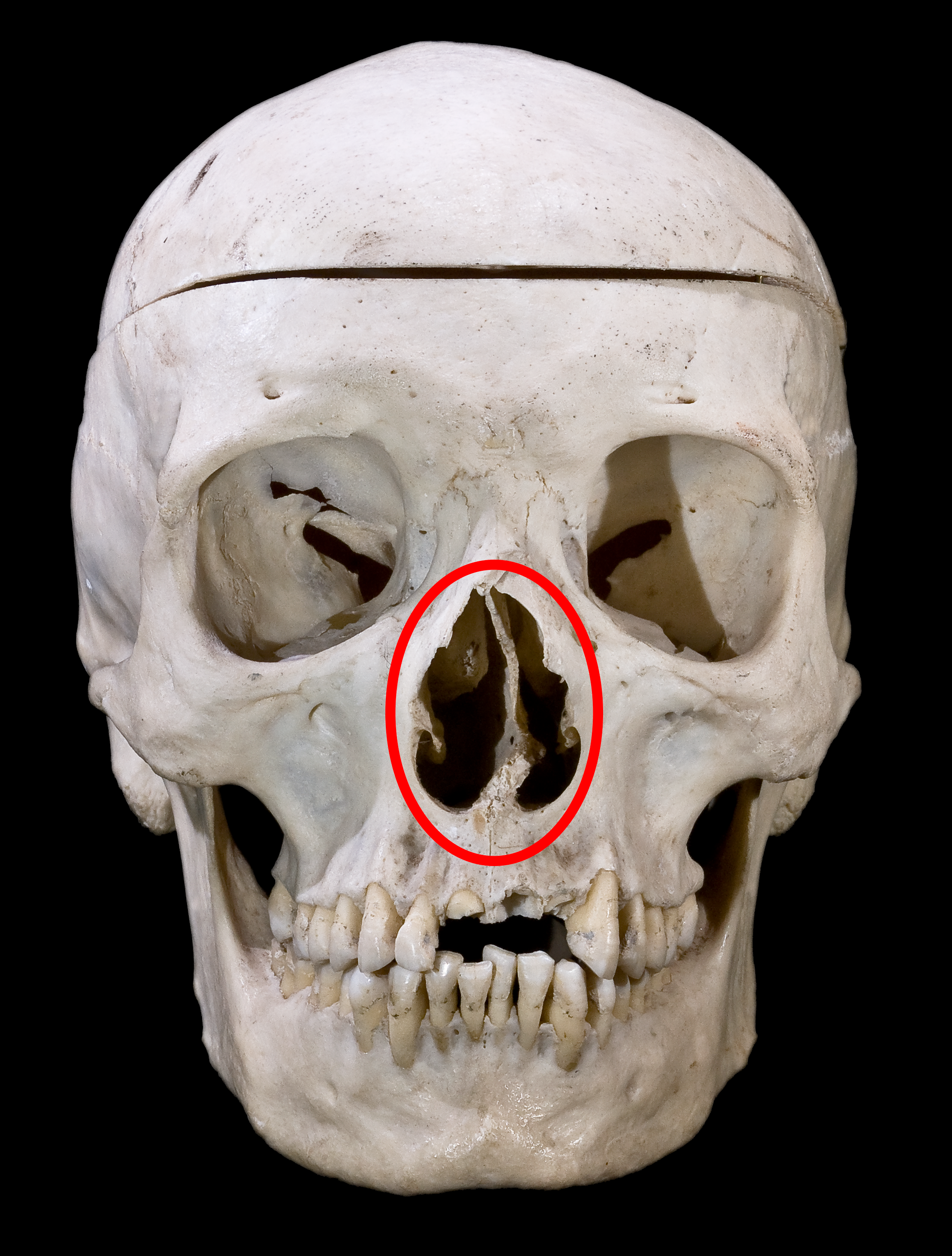
- A human skull with the piriform aperture circled in red

Details

Identifiers
- Latin: apertura piriformis
- TA98: A02.1.00.088
- TA2: 493
- FMA: 53137

The piriform aperture, pyriform aperture, or anterior nasal aperture is a pear-shaped opening in the human skull. Its long axis is vertical, and narrow end upward; in the recent state it is much contracted by the lateral nasal cartilage and the greater and lesser alar cartilages of the nose. It is bounded above by the inferior borders of the nasal bones; laterally by the thin, sharp margins which separate the anterior from the nasal surfaces of the maxilla; and below by the same borders, where they curve medialward to join each other at the anterior nasal spine.

Congenital nasal piriform aperture stenosis (CNPAS) is a rare neonatal condition related to holoprosencephaly. Infants with the condition present bony growth of the frontonasal process which narrows the piriform aperture and causes mild to severe respiratory distress. Surgical intervention may be needed to treat CNPAS.

The enlargement of the piriform aperture, called piriplasty, is an surgical procedure used to treat internal nasal valve obstruction in adults. Piriplasty may be effective in some cases, although it has not been studied much, and there is no current consensus on what normal piriform aperture dimensions may be.
