= Dilator naris muscle =

Facial muscle that controls the nostril opening

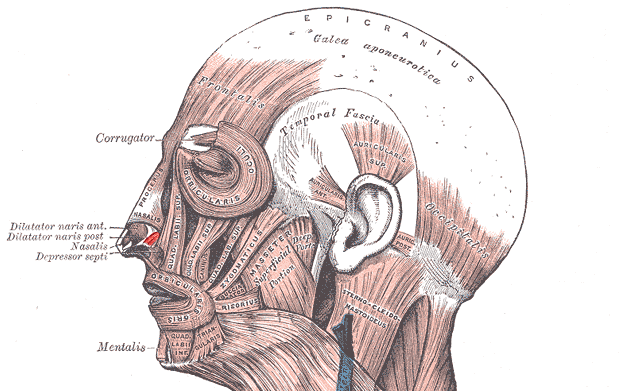
- Muscles of the head, face, and neck.

Details
- Origin: Margin of the nasal notch of the maxilla, greater and lesser alar cartilages
- Insertion: Skin near the margin of the nostril
- Nerve: Buccal branch of the facial nerve
- Actions: Dilates nostrils

Identifiers
- Latin: pars alaris musculi nasalis

The dilator naris muscle (or alae nasi muscle) is a part of the nasalis muscle. It has an anterior and a posterior part. It has origins from the nasal notch of the maxilla and the major alar cartilage, and a single insertion near the margin of the nostril. It controls nostril width, including changes during breathing. Its function can be tested as an analogue for the function of the facial nerve (VII), which supplies it.

== Structure ==
The dilator naris muscle is divided into posterior and anterior parts.

- The dilator naris posterior is placed partly beneath the levator labii superioris muscle. It arises from the margin of the nasal notch of the maxilla, and from the minor alar cartilages. It is inserted into the skin near the margin of the nostril.
- The dilator naris anterior is a delicate fasciculus. It originates from the lateral crus of the major alar cartilage, more laterally. It inserts into the margin of the nostril, the alar groove. It is situated in front of the dilatator naris posterior muscle.

=== Nerve supply ===
The dilator naris muscle is supplied by the facial nerve (VII).

== Function ==
The dilator naris muscle has a role in widening and narrowing the nostril, along with other muscles. It may prevent the collapse of the nostril during inhalation, particularly in people with narrower nostrils. The respiratory centre of the brainstem can use the muscle to control nostril width in relation to breathing. It also moves the tip of the nose slightly.

== Clinical significance ==
The function of the dilator naris muscle can be used as an analogue for the activity of the facial nerve (VII).

== History ==
The dilator naris muscle may also be known as the alae nasi muscle.
