= Alar septum =

Alar septum can refer to:

- Greater alar cartilage
- Lesser alar cartilages
