= Nasal aperture =

Nasal aperture may refer to:

- Posterior nasal apertures
- Anterior nasal aperture
