= Alaris (disambiguation) =

Alaris is a regional rail network run by the Spanish national rail company Renfe Operadora.

Alaris may also refer to:

== Business ==
- Alaris, Inc., a defunct computer motherboard manufacturer
- Kodak Alaris, a manufacturer and marketer of traditional photographic supplies
- A line of medical infusion pumps produced by BD
- A brand of 3D desktop printer from Objet Geometries

== Fiction ==
- Alaris (comics), a Marvel Comics character
- EverQuest: Veil of Alaris, an expansion of the EverQuest online role-playing game
- Alaris Prime, a moon in the Star Wars universe

== Other ==
- A grammatical form of alar, as in Alar cartilages
- Euthycera alaris, a species of fly
- Gallicolumba rufigula alaris, a subspecies of the Cinnamon ground dove
