= Depressor septi nasi muscle =

Muscle of face

Depressor septi nasi
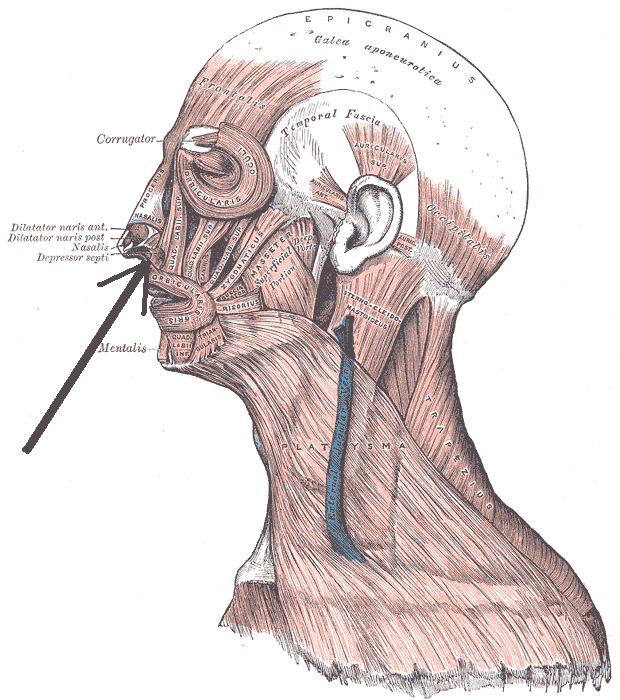
- Muscles of the head, face, and neck.

Details
- Origin: Incisive fossa of the maxilla
- Insertion: Nasal septum and back part of the alar part of nasalis muscle
- Nerve: Buccal branch of the facial nerve
- Actions: Depresses nasal septum, constricts nostril, moves apex of nose during movement of upper lip (e.g. talking)

Identifiers
- Latin: musculus depressor septi nasi
- TA98: A04.1.03.012
- TA2: 2065
- FMA: 46777

The depressor septi nasi muscle (or depressor alae nasi muscle) is a muscle of the face. It connects the incisive fossa of the maxilla and the orbicularis oris muscle to the nasal septum of the nose. It draws the ala of the nose downwards, reducing the size of the nostrils.

== Structure ==
The depressor septi nasi muscle arises from the incisive foramen of the maxilla. It may also partially originate from the orbicularis oris muscle. Its fibers ascend to be inserted into the nasal septum and back part of the alar part of nasalis muscle.

It lies between the mucous membrane and the muscular structure of the lip.

== Function ==
The depressor septi is a direct antagonist of the other muscles of the nose, drawing the ala of the nose downward, constricting the nostrils.

It works like the alar part of the nasalis muscle.

== Clinical significance ==
During rhinoplasty, repositioning of the head of the depressor septi nasi muscle ensures normal nose position after surgery. Various approaches may be used, with similar results.

== Additional images ==
Position of depressor septi nasi muscle (shown in red).
