= Classification of cleft lip and cleft palate =

Cleft lip and clip palate is an "umbrella term" for a heterogeneous collection of orofacial clefts. It includes clefting of the upper lip, the maxillary alveolus (dental arch), and the hard or soft palate, in various combinations. The anatomic combinations include:

- cleft lip [CL]
- cleft lip and alveolus [CLA]
- cleft lip, alveolus, and palate [CLAP]
- cleft lip and palate (with an intact alveolus) [CLP]
- cleft palate [CP]

== Laterality ==
Embryologically, the upper lip may become clefted in the center (a median cleft lip) or on one or both sides (a paramedian cleft lip). The paramedian form is more common, and the median cleft lip is exceedingly rare. Most classification schemes consider only paramedian cleft lip to fall under the CL/P grouping, although this has been the subject of some controversy. (Many consider the median cleft lip to be better grouped under the Tessier classification for atypical orofacial clefts, with median cleft lip representing a Tessier 0 cleft.) The typical paramedian cleft lip may affect one side (unilateral) or both sides (bilateral). A unilateral cleft lip is much more common.

Clefting of the maxillary alveolus tends to accompany the cleft of the lip, and thus may affect the center (with a median cleft lip) or one or both sides (in unilateral or bilateral paramedian cleft lip, respectively).

Cleft palate does not have laterality in the same sense that the cleft lip does. Rather, there are certain morphologic forms of cleft palate (described succinctly by the Veau classification, as explained in detail below). An isolated cleft of the palate (whether Veau-I soft palate only or Veau-II hard and soft palate) is a "midline" cleft. A Veau-III cleft may be considered "unilateral," as it is contiguous with a unilateral cleft lip. A Veau-IV cleft may be considered "midline" or "bilateral" as it is contiguous with a bilateral cleft lip. Due to the confusion regarding laterality of the palate, usage of the terms "midline," "unilateral," and "bilateral" should be discouraged in favor of more accurate morphologic descriptions.

== Severity of cleft lip ==
The clefting of the lip may be complete, incomplete, or lesser-form, with the lesser-form clefts being further subdivided into minor-form, microform, and mini-microform. A bilateral cleft lip may feature the same degree of clefting on each side (and thus be symmetric bilateral cleft lip) or may differ from side-to-side (asymmetric bilateral cleft lip). The severity of the cleft lip informs the choice for operative repair.

== Morphology of cleft palate ==
The clefting of the palate is most usefully described by the Veau classification:

- Veau-I cleft palate: A midline cleft of the velum (soft palate), with the intact hard palate.
- Veau-II cleft palate: A midline cleft of the velum (soft palate) and secondary hard palate (posterior to the incisive foramen), with intact primary palate (anterior to the incisive foramen)
- Veau-III cleft palate: A cleft of the velum (soft palate), extending unilaterally through the secondary hard palate, past the incisive foramen, and through the primary hard palate and alveolus. The vomer (the bony part of the nasal septum) remains attached to the palatal shelf on the greater segment (non-cleft side).
- Veau-IV cleft palate: A cleft of the velum (soft palate), extending in the midline through the secondary hard palate up to the incisive foramen and then bilaterally through the primary hard palate and alveolus on each side. The vomer (the bony part of the nasal septum) remains in the midline and is attached to the premaxilla.

In addition to these four types, there exists a submucous cleft palate. In the submucous cleft palate, the palate appears grossly intact, without an obvious cleft. However, deep to the intact mucosa, there may be a separation of the levator palatini muscles, and thus palatal function is affected. Subtle signs of submucous cleft palate may include the zona pellucida (a pale coloring of the midline of the palate, indicative of a submucous bony defect), notching of the hard palate at its posterior edge, and bifid uvula. Some clinicians make the distinction between overt submucous cleft palate (in which these signs are present) and occult submucous cleft palate, in which case they may not be appreciable, but the levator musculature is in fact clefted.

Another method of morphologic description of the palate is the Randall classification, which describes palatal length (Randall class I being the normal length and class IV being severely short). Several studies have shown a correlation between Randall classification and future speech quality after palatal repair; however, the utility of the Randall classification is contested as being too subjective and having poor inter-rater reliability.

== Notation ==
=== Pictographic notation ===
Various forms of pictographic notation have been developed to illustrate the exact anatomic involvement, as well as severity. The most popular of these diagrams was developed by Kernahan and was called the "striped-Y diagram." It was commonly used in the era of paper-based medical records, but its usage has diminished considerably with the advent of electronic health records (EHR). Examples of various forms of pictographic notation are available.

=== Phenotypic description by LAHSHAL notation ===
LAHSHAL is a palindrome representing the anatomic structures, proceeding from the patient's right side toward left side:

L	A	H	S	H	A	L
right lip	right alveolus	right hard palate	midline soft palate	left hard palate	left alveolus	left lip

In the LAHSHAL system, each column of the acronym is filled by a letter or symbol that confirms involvement of that part of the anatomy as well as the severity of the clefting: A capital letter means that anatomic feature was completely clefted; a lowercase letter means incomplete clefting; an asterisk (*) means minimal clefting (e.g., lesser-form cleft lip, notched alveolus, submucous cleft palate); and a period (.) or dot (•) means that anatomic feature is normally developed.

The following are examples of LAHSHAL notations and their meanings:

LAHSHAL Shorthand Notation	Longhand Phenotypic Description
[ LAHS••• ]	right unilateral complete cleft lip, complete cleft alveolus, and complete "unilateral" (Veau-III) cleft palate
[ laHS••• ]	right unilateral incomplete cleft lip and alveolus, with complete "unilateral" (Veau-III) cleft palate
[ •••SHal ]	left unilateral incomplete cleft lip and alveolus, with complete "unilateral" (Veau-III) cleft palate
[ LAHSHAL ]	bilateral symmetric complete cleft lip, complete cleft alveolus, and complete "bilateral" (Veau-IV) cleft palate
[ l*HSH*L ]	bilateral symmetric incomplete cleft lip, notched cleft alveolus, and complete "bilateral" (Veau-IV) cleft palate
[ ••HSH•• ]	complete "midline" (Veau-II) cleft of hard and soft palate
[ •••S••• ]	complete "midline" (Veau-I) cleft of soft palate

A further modification to the LAHSHAL system has been described, which allows designation of a skin band (sometimes referred to as Simonart band) that is present in a complete cleft lip, using a plus sign (+) in the L column if a skin band is present.

The LAHSHAL system can describe over 12,000 combinations (of anatomy and severity) for CL/P. As such, it is extremely detailed. While its conciseness lends it well to usage in informatics, its steep learning curve has resulted in limited utility.

=== Phenotypic description by CLAP notation ===
The CLAP notation was developed to be a more readable and clinically informative representation of cleft phenotype. The CLAP notation consists of the capital letters L, A, and P, denoting involvement of the lip, alveolus, and palate, respectively—Presence of that capital letter signifies clefting of that part of the anatomy, and absence of that letter signifies that part of the anatomy is normal (non-clefted). To represent laterality and severity of any cleft lip, a lowercase prefix composed of two letters is added: that is, for laterality, u designates unilateral and b designates bilateral; and for severity, c designates complete, i designates incomplete, and m designates lesser-forms (minor-form, microform, and mini-microform). To describe the morphology of cleft palate, a suffix is appended using lowercase v1 to designate Veau-I, v2 for Veau-II, v3 for Veau-III, v4 for Veau-IV, sm for occult submucous cleft palate, and bu for overt submucous cleft palate with bifid uvula. (Note that no severity notation is given for any clefting of the alveolus, as the mere presence of the capital A is informative enough for treatment planning.)

Prefix (describing cleft lip)		CLAP (anatomic involvement)		Suffix (describing cleft palate)
Laterality	Severity	CLAP (anatomic involvement)		Suffix (describing cleft palate)
u (unilateral) b (bilateral)	c (complete) i (incomplete) m (lesser-form)	C	L (lip); A (alveolus); P (palate)	v1 (Veau-I) v2 (Veau-II) v3 (Veau-III) v4 (Veau-IV) sm (occult submucous) bu (overt submucous, with bifid uvula)

Examples of CLAP notations are provided below:

CLAP Shorthand Notation	Longhand Phenotypic Description
[ ucCLA ]	unilateral complete cleft lip and alveolus
[ uiCLA ]	unilateral incomplete cleft lip and alveolus
[ umCL ]	unilateral lesser-form cleft lip
[ CPv2 ]	Veau-II cleft palate
[ CPsm ]	Submucous cleft palate
[ ucCLAPv3 ]	unilateral complete cleft lip, alveolus, and Veau-III palate
[ bcCLAPv4 ]	bilateral complete cleft lip, alveolus, and Veau-IV palate

Sidedness (left/right) of unilateral clefts is not abbreviated but may optionally be included in the square braces, e.g. [right ucCLAPv3].

CLAP notation appeals to the embryologically based classification systems because it provides an adequate description of the preforaminal and postforaminal components of the cleft (i.e., anterior and posterior to the incisive foramen). It is also appealing to clinicians because it concisely conveys the important information about anatomy, severity, and morphology that is useful to treatment planning.

=== Coding ===
Diagnostic codes exist to describe the various forms of CL/P. The two most common coding systems used for description of the type of cleft include ICD-9 and ICD-10 (or modifications in the United States, ICD-9-CM and ICD-10-CM). In ICD-9-CM, cleft lip is encoded by 749.10-749.14; cleft palate by 749.00-749.04; and cleft lip with cleft palate by 749.20-749.25. In ICD-10-CM, cleft lip is encoded by Q36.0-Q36.9; cleft palate by Q35.7-Q35.9; and cleft lip with cleft palate by Q37.8-Q37.9.

Because ICD-9-CM and ICD-10-CM systems are very generic and do not adequately convey the complexity of the various forms of CL/P, modifications to these coding systems were developed for use in epidemiologic surveillance and research. These systems include information about laterality, severity, and specific anatomic involvement (including the status of the alveolus, which is notably ignored by the ICD-based systems). The most commonly used modification is the BPA/CDC system, which is used by the Centers for Disease Control and Prevention (CDC) and many departments of health in the United States. The BPA/CDC system was originally a modification of the ICD-9 system, although the two systems diverged significantly. The BPA/CDC system is still used widely for birth defects monitoring and research, even though ICD-9-CM has been replaced in clinical use by ICD-10-CM.

More recently, an expansion to the ICD-10-CM framework was developed, with a 1:1 equivalency between true phenotypic class and expanded code.
