= Alar cartilages =

Alar cartilages may refer to:

- Major alar cartilage (cartilago alaris major)
- Minor alar cartilage (cartilago alaris minor)
