= Nasal glands =

Mucous-producing glands in the nose

Details
- Nerve: Facial nerve via parasympathetic branch of nerve of pterygoid canal

Identifiers
- Latin: glandula nasales
- TA98: A06.1.02.020
- TA2: 3161
- FMA: 71625

The nasal glands are the seromucous glands in the respiratory region of the nasal mucous membrane. The three major types of nasal glands are anterior serous glands, seromucous glands, and Bowman glands.

== Glands ==
=== Anterior serous glands ===
The anterior nasal glands help moisturize the nasal mucosa.

=== Seromucous glands ===
The seromucous glands are found primarily in the anterior nasal cavity, and they are also found within the nasal cavity.

=== Bowman glands ===
The Bowman glands are serous glands that help the olfactory region with smelling.

== Notes ==
1. Medical Definition
2. Pediatric Otolaryngology
