= Internal nasal branches of infraorbital nerve =

Group of nerves of the face

Details
- From: infraorbital nerve

Identifiers
- Latin: rami nasales interni nervi infraorbitalis
- TA98: A14.2.01.062
- TA2: 6244
- FMA: 52985

The internal nasal branches of infraorbital nerve are small branches which can supply the septum.
