= Vomeronasal cartilage =

Connective tissue of the nasal cavity

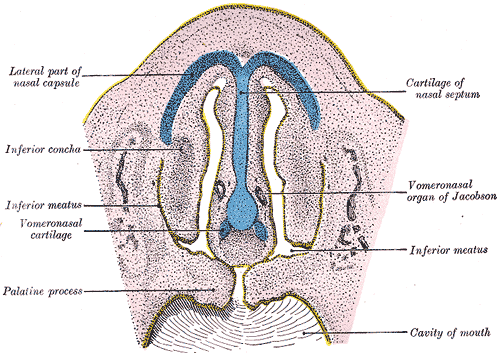
- Frontal section of nasal cavities of a human embryo 28 mm long. (Vomeronasal cartilage labeled at bottom left.)

Details

Identifiers
- Latin: cartilago vomeronasalis
- TA98: A06.1.01.016
- TA2: 949
- FMA: 59514

The vomeronasal cartilage (or Jacobson's cartilage) is a narrow strip of cartilage, low on the medial wall of the nasal cavity. It lies between the septal nasal cartilage and the vomer. The cartilage lies below, but is not connected to, the rudimentary vomeronasal organ.

Ludwig Lewin Jacobson (1783–1843), a Danish anatomist, named this structure in 1809.
