= Nostril =

Nose orifice that enables the entry and exit of air

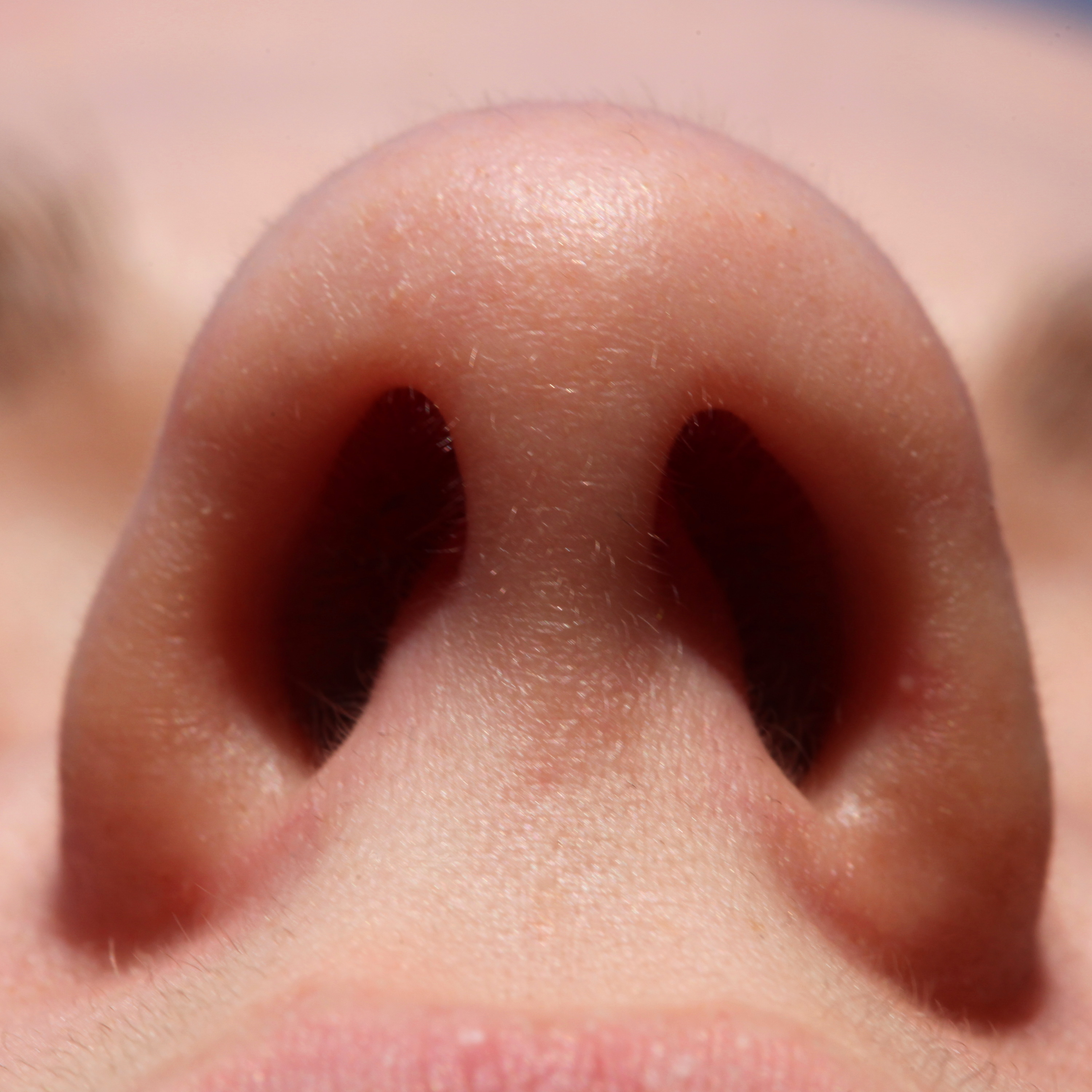
- Human nostrils

Details
- Part of: Nose
- System: Olfactory system

Identifiers
- Latin: naris
- TA98: A06.1.02.002
- TA2: 3166

A nostril (or naris /ˈnɛərɪs/, pl.: nares /ˈnɛəriːz/) is either of the two orifices of the nose. They enable the entry and exit of air and other gasses through the nasal cavities. In birds and mammals, they contain branched bones or cartilages called turbinates, whose function is to warm air on inhalation and remove moisture on exhalation. Fish do not breathe through noses, but they do have two small holes used for smelling, which can also be referred to as nostrils (with the exception of Cyclostomi, which have just one nostril).

In humans, the nasal cycle is the normal ultradian cycle of each nostril's blood vessels becoming engorged in swelling, then shrinking.

The nostrils are separated by the septum. The septum can sometimes be deviated, causing one nostril to appear larger than the other. With extreme damage to the septum and columella, the two nostrils are no longer separated and form a single larger external opening.

Like other tetrapods, humans have two external nostrils (anterior nares) and two additional nostrils at the back of the nasal cavity, inside the head (posterior nares, posterior nasal apertures or choanae). They also connect the nose to the throat (the nasopharynx), aiding in respiration. Though all four nostrils were on the outside of the head of the aquatic ancestors of modern tetrapods, the nostrils for outgoing water (excurrent nostrils) migrated to the inside of the mouth, as evidenced by the discovery of Kenichthys campbelli, a 395-million-year-old fossilized lobe-finned fish which shows this migration in progress. It has two nostrils between its front teeth, similar to human embryos at an early stage. If these fail to join up, the result is a cleft palate.

Each external nostril contains approximately 1,000 strands of nasal hair, which function to filter foreign particles such as pollen and dust.

It is possible for humans to smell different olfactory inputs in the two nostrils and experience a perceptual rivalry akin to that of binocular rivalry when there are two different inputs to the two eyes. Furthermore, scent information from the two nostrils leads to two types of neural activity with the first cycle corresponding to the ipsilateral and the second cycle corresponding to the contralateral odor representations. In some cultures the extreme wide flaring of the nostrils accompanied by the baring of the upper teeth is often referred to as "doing the nostrils."

The Procellariiformes are distinguished from other birds by having tubular extensions of their nostrils.

Widely-spaced nostrils, like those of the hammerhead shark, may be useful in determining the direction of an odour's source.

== See also ==
- Dilator naris muscle
- Nasal cycle
- Piriform aperture
