= Nasal cycle =

Subconscious alternation of the nasal cavities

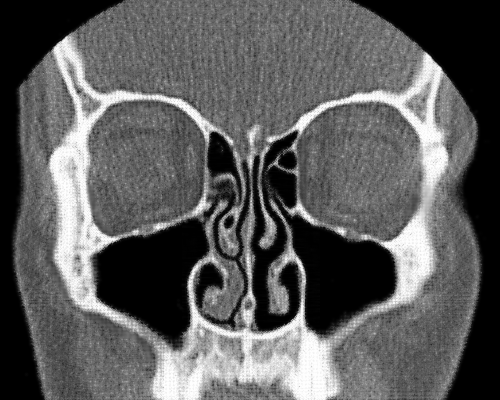
A CT scan showing evidence of the nasal cycle: the more patent airway is on the right of the image, the swollen turbinates congesting the left.

The nasal cycle is the subconscious alternating partial congestion and decongestion of the nasal cavities in humans and other animals. This results in greater airflow through one nostril with periodic alternation between the nostrils. It is a physiological congestion of the nasal conchae, also called the nasal turbinates (curled bony projections within the nasal cavities), due to selective activation of one half of the autonomic nervous system by the hypothalamus. It should not be confused with pathological nasal congestion.

== Description ==
In the modern western literature, it was first described by the German physician Richard Kayser in 1895.

In 1927, Heetderks described the alternating turgescence of the inferior turbinates in 80% of a normal population. According to Heetderks, the cycle is the result of alternating congestion and decongestion of the nasal conchae or turbinates, predominantly the inferior turbinates, which are by far the largest of the turbinates in each nasal fossa. Turbinates consist of bony projections covered by erectile tissue, much like the tissues of the penis and clitoris. The turbinates in one fossa fill up with blood while the opposite turbinates decongest by shunting blood away. This cycle, which is controlled by the autonomic nervous system, has a mean duration of two and a half hours but varies widely with age, body-posture, and other conditions. He further observed and documented that the turbinates in the dependent nasal fossa fill when the patient is lying down. The nasal cycle is an alternation in both time and between left and right sides, with the total resistance in the nose remaining constant. In patients with a fixed septal deviation and intermittent nasal obstruction, the interplay of the nasal cycle becomes evident; the sensation of obstruction frequently mirrors the congestion phase.

It is possible that the nasal cycle may exacerbate the nasal congestion caused by the common cold, as the lack of motility of the cilia in one half of the nose may lead to an uncomfortable sensation of not being able to shift mucus by blowing the nose.

== Benefits for breathing ==
It has been shown that the cilia of the congested side suspend their motility until that side decongests. Thus the cycle ensures that one side of the nose is always moist, to facilitate humidification, which is one of the three functions of the nose, the other two being filtration and warming of inspired air prior to its entering the lungs.

== Benefits for olfaction ==
The asymmetric airflow through both nostrils may have some benefit to overall olfactory sensitivity. So some odor chemicals bind with olfactory receptors easily, even under conditions of high airflow, while other odors need more time, under low airflow conditions, to bind with receptors. By consequence, with high airflow on one side and low airflow on the other side, the olfactory center may detect a greater range of smells.

== Distinction ==
The nasal cycle should not be confused with pathological nasal congestion: individuals with normal nasal breathing usually do not realize their breathing is asymmetric unless there is underlying nasal obstruction. In pathological conditions, however, the nasal cycle may influence the symptoms.

== Research on the effects ==
A 1994 study suggested that breathing through alternate nostrils can affect brain hemisphere symmetry on EEG topography. A later study in 2007 showed that this cycle (as well as manipulation through forced nostril breathing on one side) has an effect on endogenous ultradian rhythms of the autonomic and central nervous system. However, more recent research has shown no statistically significant association between spontaneously (i.e., not forced) dominant nostril and active brain hemisphere.
