= Major alar cartilage =

Cartilaginous plate in the nose

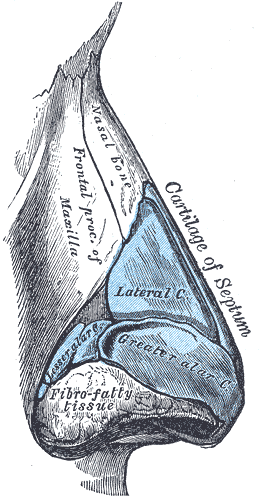
- Cartilages of the nose. Side view. (Major alar cartilage visible in blue at center right.)

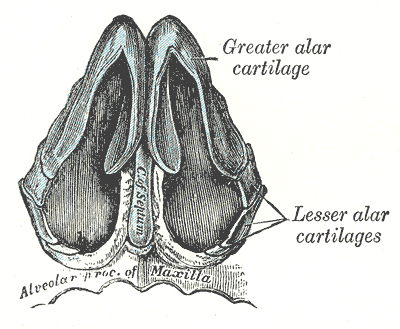
- Cartilages of the nose, seen from below.

Details

Identifiers
- Latin: cartilago alaris major
- TA98: A06.1.01.007
- TA2: 940
- FMA: 59504

The major alar cartilage (greater alar cartilage) (lower lateral cartilage) is a thin, flexible plate, situated immediately below the lateral nasal cartilage, and bent upon itself in such a manner as to form the medial wall and lateral wall of the nostril of its own side.

The portion which forms the medial wall (crus mediale) is loosely connected with the corresponding portion of the opposite cartilage, the two forming, together with the thickened integument and subjacent tissue, the nasal septum.

The part which forms the lateral wall (crus laterale) is curved to correspond with the ala of the nose; it is oval and flattened, narrow behind, where it is connected with the frontal process of the maxilla by a tough fibrous membrane, in which are found three or four small cartilaginous plates, the lesser alar cartilages (cartilagines alares minores; sesamoid cartilages).

Above, it is connected by fibrous tissue to the lateral cartilage and front part of the cartilage of the septum; below, it falls short of the margin of the nostril, the ala being completed by fatty and fibrous tissue covered by skin.

In front, the greater alar cartilages are separated by a notch which corresponds with the apex of the nose.
