= Lateral nasal cartilage =

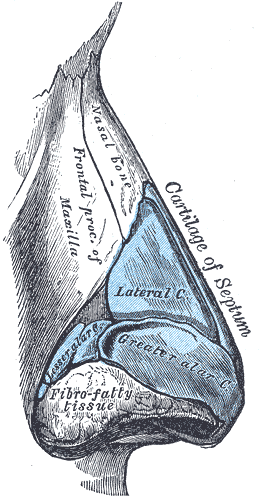
- Cartilages of the nose. Side view. (Lateral C. visible in blue at right.)

Details

Identifiers
- Latin: cartilago nasi lateralis
- TA98: A06.1.01.014
- TA2: 947
- FMA: 59579 59511, 59579

The lateral nasal cartilage (upper lateral cartilage, lateral process of septal nasal cartilage) is situated below the inferior margin of the nasal bone, and is flattened, and triangular in shape.

Its anterior margin is thicker than the posterior, and is continuous above with the septal nasal cartilage, but separated from it below by a narrow fissure; its superior margin is attached to the nasal bone and the frontal process of the maxilla; its inferior margin is connected by fibrous tissue with the greater alar cartilage. Where the lateral cartilage meets the greater alar cartilage, the lateral cartilage often curls up, to join with an inward curl of the greater alar cartilage. That curl of the inferior portion of the lateral cartilage is called its "scroll."
