= Septal nasal cartilage =

Hyaline cartilage in the nose

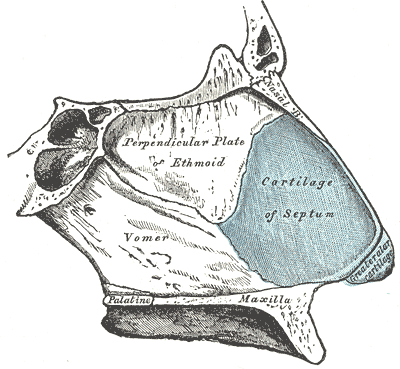
- Bones and cartilages of the septum of the nose. Right side (cartilage of the septum visible as the blue structure at right)

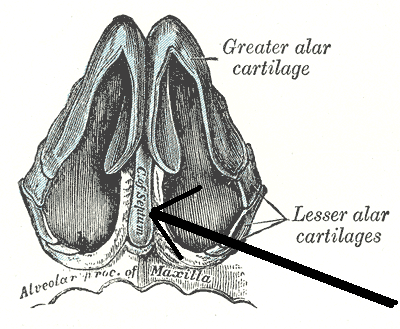
- Cartilages of the nose, seen from below (cartilage of septum visible in blue at bottom center)

Details

Identifiers
- Latin: cartilago septi nasi
- TA98: A06.1.01.013
- TA2: 946
- FMA: 59503

The septal nasal cartilage (also known as the cartilage of the septum, quadrangular cartilage, cartilaginous nasal septum, mesorostral cartilage, or mesethmoid cartilage) is composed of hyaline cartilage. It is somewhat quadrilateral in form, thicker at its margins than at its center, and completes the separation between the nasal cavities in front.

Its anterior margin, thickest above, is connected with the nasal bones, and is continuous with the anterior margins of the lateral cartilages; below, it is connected to the medial crura of the major alar cartilages by fibrous tissue.

Its posterior margin is connected with the perpendicular plate of the ethmoid; its inferior margin with the vomer and the palatine processes of the maxillae.

== In other animals ==
=== Ossification ===
In some animals, the cartilaginous nasal septum becomes partly or completely ossified. The homology of this element is complex, and the septum may ossify from a number of different ossification centres. As such, different bones make up the bony septum in different species. Depending on the taxon, it may have contributions from the presphenoid, the mesethmoid, the orbitosphenoid, and/or the sphenethmoid. In pigs, the septum may undergo increasing ossification with age, eventually fusing with the rostral bone.
