= Nasal septum =

Separator of the left and right airways in the nose

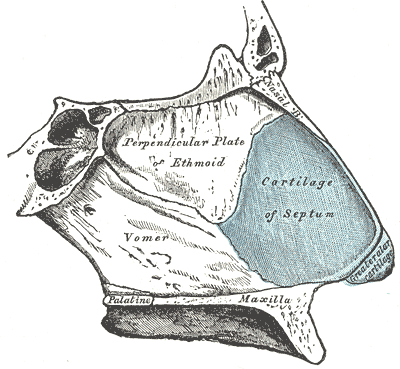
- Bones and cartilages of the septum of the nose. Right side.

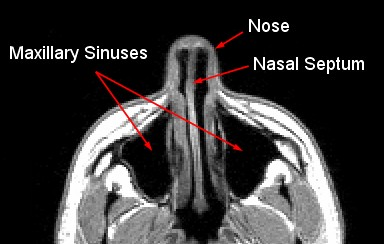
- MRI image showing nasal septum from an axial slice through human head

Details
- Artery: Anterior ethmoidal posterior ethmoidal sphenopalatine greater palatine branch of superior labial
- Nerve: Anterior ethmoidal nasopalatine nerves, medial posterosuperior nasal branches of pterygopalatine ganglion
- Lymph: Anterior half to submandibular nodes, posterior half to retropharyngeal and deep cervical lymph nodes

Identifiers
- Latin: septum nasi
- MeSH: D009300
- TA98: A06.1.02.004
- TA2: 3137
- FMA: 54375

The nasal septum (Latin: septum nasi) separates the left and right airways of the nasal cavity, dividing the two nostrils.

It is depressed by the depressor septi nasi muscle.

== Structure ==
The fleshy external end of the nasal septum is called the columella or columella nasi, and is made up of cartilage and soft tissue. The nasal septum contains bone and hyaline cartilage. It is normally about 2 mm thick.

The nasal septum is composed of four structures:

- Maxillary bone (the crest)
- Perpendicular plate of ethmoid bone
- Septal nasal cartilage (i.e., quandrangular cartilage)
- Vomer bone

The lowest part of the septum is a narrow strip of bone that projects from the maxilla and the palatine bones, and is the length of the septum. This strip of bone is called the maxillary crest; it articulates in front with the septal nasal cartilage, and at the back with the vomer. The maxillary crest is described in the anatomy of the nasal septum as having a maxillary component and a palatine component.

=== Development ===
Vomer of infant

At an early period, the septum of the nose consists of a plate of cartilage, known as the ethmovomerine cartilage.

The posterosuperior part of this cartilage is ossified to form the perpendicular plate of the ethmoid; its anteroinferior portion persists as the septal cartilage, while the vomer is ossified in the membrane covering its posteroinferior part.

Two ossification centers, one on either side of the middle line, appear about the eighth week of fetal development in this part of the membrane, and hence the vomer consists primarily of two lamellae.

About the third month, these unite below, and thus a deep groove is formed in which the cartilage is lodged.

As growth proceeds, the union of the lamellae extends upward and forward, and at the same time, the intervening plate of cartilage undergoes absorption.

By the onset of puberty the lamellae are almost completely united to form a median plate, but evidence of the bilaminar origin of the bone is seen in the everted alae of its upper border and in the groove on its anterior margin.

== Clinical significance ==
The nasal septum is the wall between the left and right sides of the nose. It is firm but bendable, and it is covered by skin that has a rich supply of blood vessels. Ideally, the nasal septum lies exactly in the center so that the left and right sides of the nose are of equal size. In about 80% of the population, this nasal septum is a little off-center but not noticeable. However, if this off-centering is more pronounced, it is known as a deviated septum. An operation to straighten the nasal septum is known as a septoplasty.

A perforated nasal septum can be caused by an ulcer, trauma due to an inserted object, long-term exposure to welding fumes, or cocaine use. There is a procedure that can be of help to those suffering from the perforated septum. A silicone button can be inserted in the hole to close the open sore.

The nasal septum can be affected by both benign tumors such as fibromas, and hemangiomas, and malignant tumors such as squamous cell carcinoma.

== Cosmetic procedures ==
A nasal septum piercing is usually carried out through the fleshy columella close to the end of the nasal septum.
