= Minor alar cartilage =

Group of cartilages in the nose

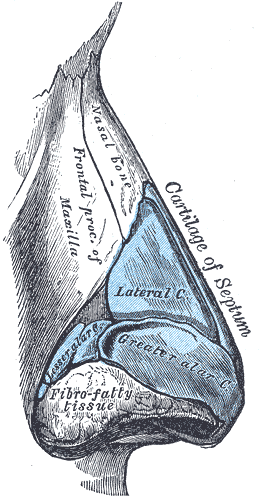
- Cartilages of the nose. Side view. (Minor alar cartilage visible in blue at center left.)

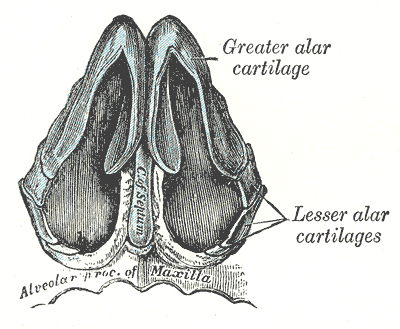
- Cartilages of the nose, seen from below.

Details

Identifiers
- Latin: cartilago alaris minor
- TA98: A06.1.01.011
- TA2: 944
- FMA: 71705

In human anatomy, the part of the nose which forms the lateral wall is curved to correspond with the ala of the nose; it is oval and flattened, narrow behind, where it is connected with the frontal process of the maxilla by a tough fibrous membrane, in which are found three or four small nasal cartilages the minor alar cartilages, also referred to as lesser alar or sesamoid cartilages or accessory cartilages.
