= Sinus implant =

Medical implant

Paranasal sinus. A. Frontal sinus B. Line of basolacrimal duct C. Maxillary sinus.

A Sinus implant is a medical device that is inserted into the sinus cavity. Implants can be in conjunction with sinus surgery to treat chronic sinusitis and also in sinus augmentation to increase bone structure for placement of dental implants.

== Types ==
=== Maxillary implant ===
A maxillary implant is an implant that is placed between the jaw and the maxillary sinuses. It is inserted during a sinus lift or augmentation, and is used to increase the amount of bone to support dental implants. Implants are either inserted after drilling, or by using a non-drilling method known as the osteotome technique. Issues such as bulging within the sinuses can occur with maxillary implants.

Maxillary implants can also be made by using Choukroun's technique with subsinus filling material. The material is used to stimulate natural bone regeneration. A clinical study of this technique detailed that all patients within the study had continuous stable implants six months after placement. It also showed a vertical bone gain in all subjects.

=== Rhinoplasty ===
Numerous different types of material have been used as sinus implants during rhinoplasty procedures. Plaster of Paris is often used during rhinoplasty and implanted into the frontal sinus. Implants used in rhinoplasty have also been reported to cause enophthalmos.

=== Sinus stent ===
Steroid-eluting sinus stents maybe used in addition to endoscopic sinus surgery. They are, however, of unclear benefit as of 2015.

== See also ==
- Bioresorbable stents
- Middle nasal concha
