= Rhinoplasty =

Surgical procedure to enhance or reconstruct a human nose

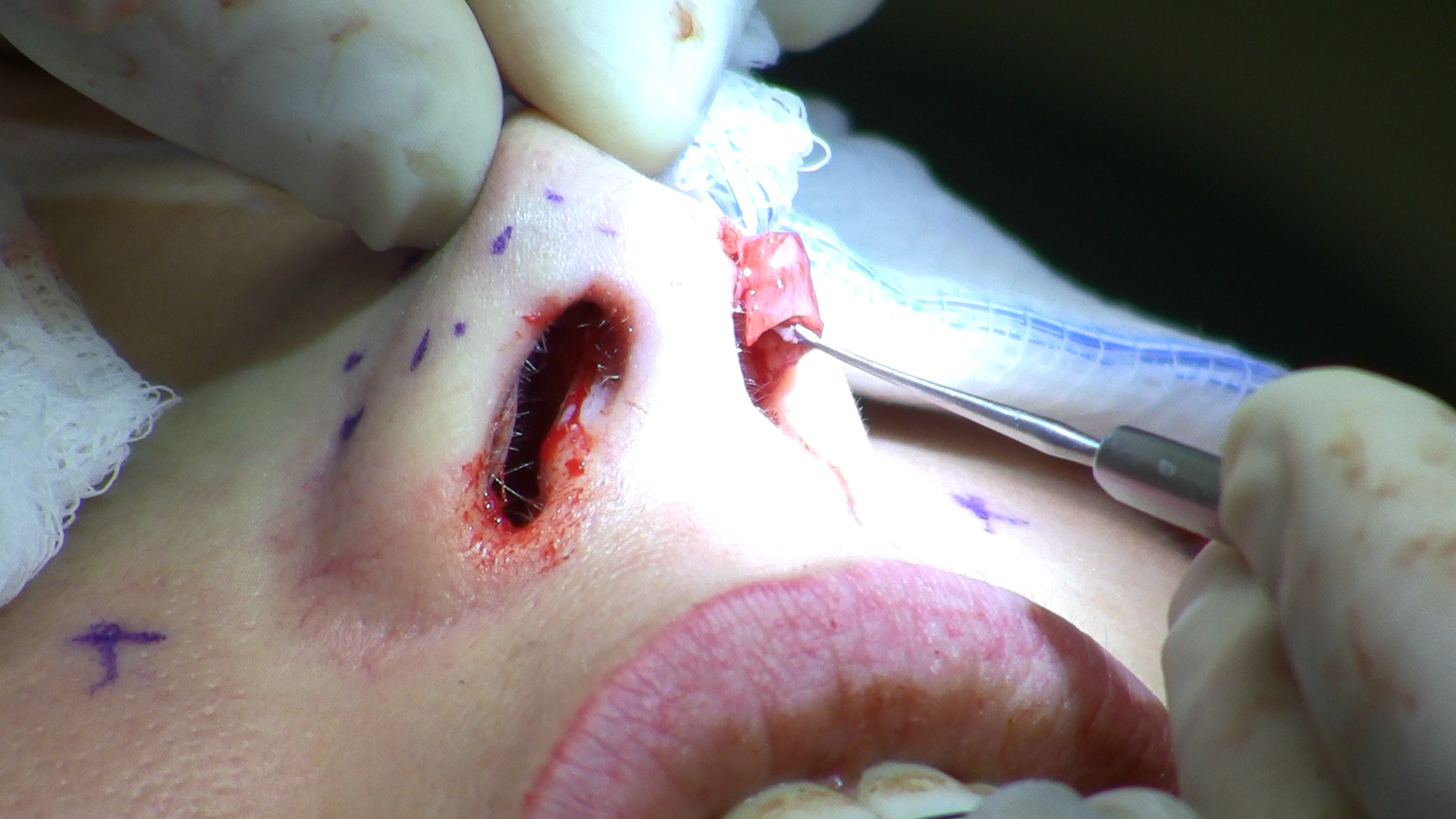
- Rhinoplasty: The lower lateral cartilage (greater alar cartilage) exposed for plastic modification via the left nostril.
- Pronunciation: /ˈraɪnəˌplæsti/, /ˈraɪnoʊˌplæsti/
- ICD-9-CM: 21.87
- MeSH: D012225
- MedlinePlus: 002983

Rhinoplasty (Note: From Ancient Greek ῥίς rhís, "nose", and πλαστός plastós, "moulded". It is commonly called nose job and medically called nasal reconstruction.), sometimes referred to as a "nose job", is a plastic surgery procedure performed to change the shape, size, or proportions of the nose or to improve nasal function and breathing. There are two types of plastic surgery used – reconstructive surgery that restores the form and functions of the nose and cosmetic surgery that changes the appearance of the nose. Reconstructive surgery seeks to resolve nasal injuries caused by various traumas including blunt, and penetrating trauma and trauma caused by blast injury. Reconstructive surgery can also treat birth defects, breathing problems, and failed primary rhinoplasties. Rhinoplasty may remove a dorsal hump, narrow the nostril width, alter the nasolabial angle, or address injuries, birth defects, or other functional issues that affect breathing, such as a deviated nasal septum, internal nasal valve collapse, or external nasal valve collapse. Surgery only on the septum is called a septoplasty.

In closed rhinoplasty and open rhinoplasty surgeries – a plastic surgeon, an otolaryngologist (ear, nose, and throat specialist), or an oral and maxillofacial surgeon (jaw, face, and neck specialist), creates a functional, aesthetic, and facially proportionate nose by separating the nasal skin and the soft tissues from the nasal framework, altering them as required for form and function, suturing the incisions, using tissue glue and applying either a package or a stent, or both, to immobilize the altered nose to ensure the proper healing of the surgical incision.

== History ==
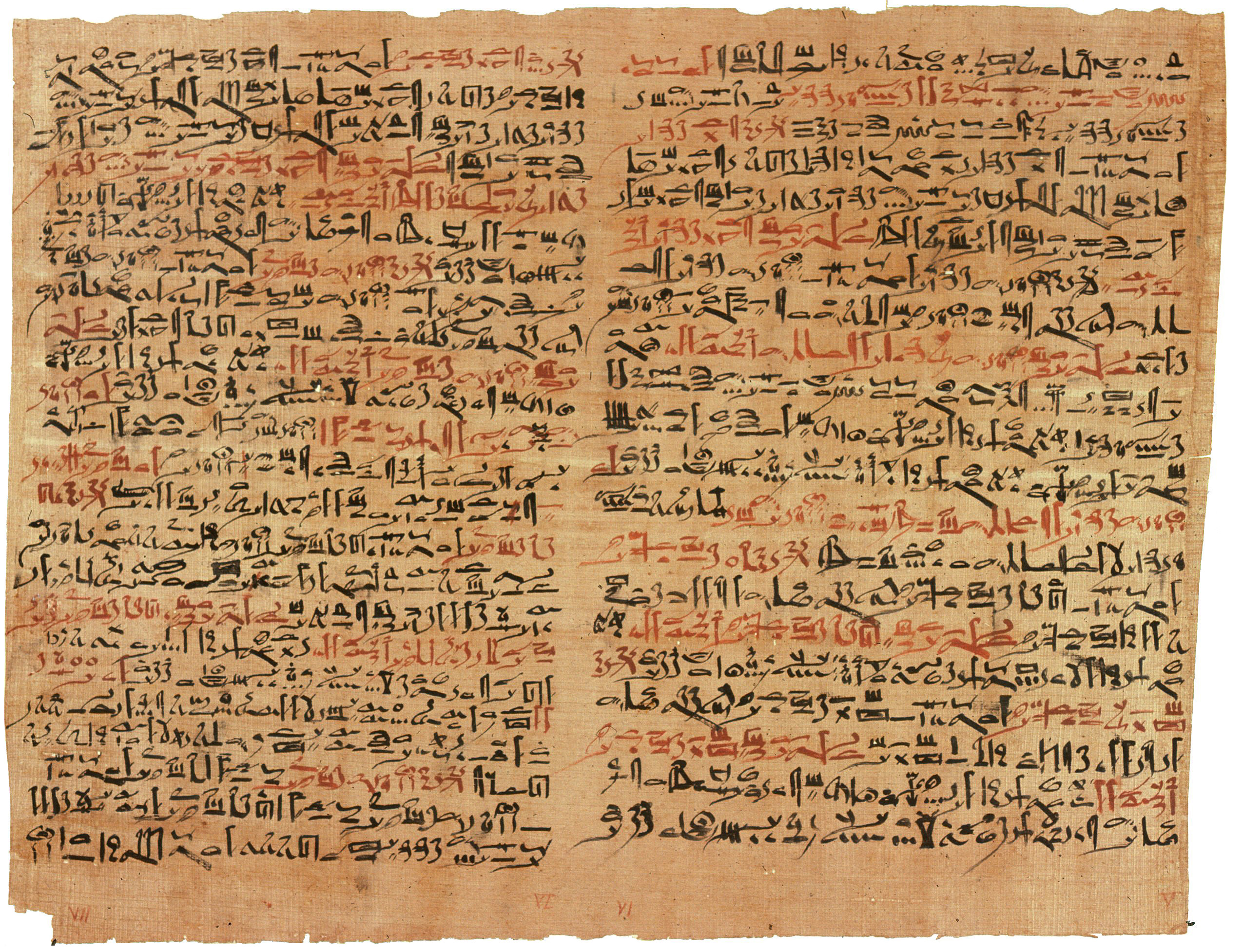
Plates vi & vii of the Edwin Smith Papyrus at the Rare Book Room, New York Academy of Medicine

Treatments for the plastic repair of a broken nose are first mentioned in the Edwin Smith Papyrus, a transcription of text dated to the Old Kingdom from 3000 to 2500 BCE.

The Ebers Papyrus (c. 1550 BC), an Ancient Egyptian medical papyrus, describes rhinoplasty as the plastic surgical operation for reconstructing a nose destroyed by rhinectomy. Such a mutilation was inflicted as a criminal, religious, political, and military punishment in that time and culture.

Rhinoplasty techniques are described in the ancient Indian text Sushruta samhita by Sushruta, where a nose is reconstructed by using a flap of skin from the cheek.

During the Roman Empire (27 BC – 476 AD) the encyclopaedist Aulus Cornelius Celsus (c. 25 BC – 50 AD) published the 8-tome De Medicina (On Medicine, c. 14 AD), which described plastic surgery techniques and procedures for the correction and the reconstruction of the nose and other body parts.

At the Byzantine Roman court of the Emperor Julian the Apostate (331–363 AD), the royal physician Oribasius (c. 320–400 AD) published the 70-volume Synagogue Medicae (Medical Compilations, 4th century AD), which described facial-defect reconstructions that featured loose sutures that permitted a surgical wound to heal without distorting the facial flesh; how to clean the bone exposed in a wound; debridement, how to remove damaged tissue to forestall infection and so accelerate healing of the wound; and how to use autologous skin flaps to repair damaged cheeks, eyebrows, lips, and nose, to restore the patient's normal visage.

In Italy, Gasparo Tagliacozzi (1546–1599), professor of surgery and anatomy at the University of Bologna, published Curtorum Chirurgia Per Insitionem (The Surgery of Defects by Implantations, 1597), a technico–procedural manual for the surgical repair and reconstruction of facial wounds in soldiers. The illustrations featured a reattachment rhinoplasty using a biceps muscle pedicle flap; the graft attached at 3-weeks post-procedure; which, at 2-weeks post-attachment, the surgeon then shaped into a nose.

In Great Britain, Joseph Constantine Carpue (1764–1846) published the descriptions of two rhinoplasties: the reconstruction of a battle-wounded nose, and the repair of an arsenic-damaged nose. (cf. Carpue's operation).

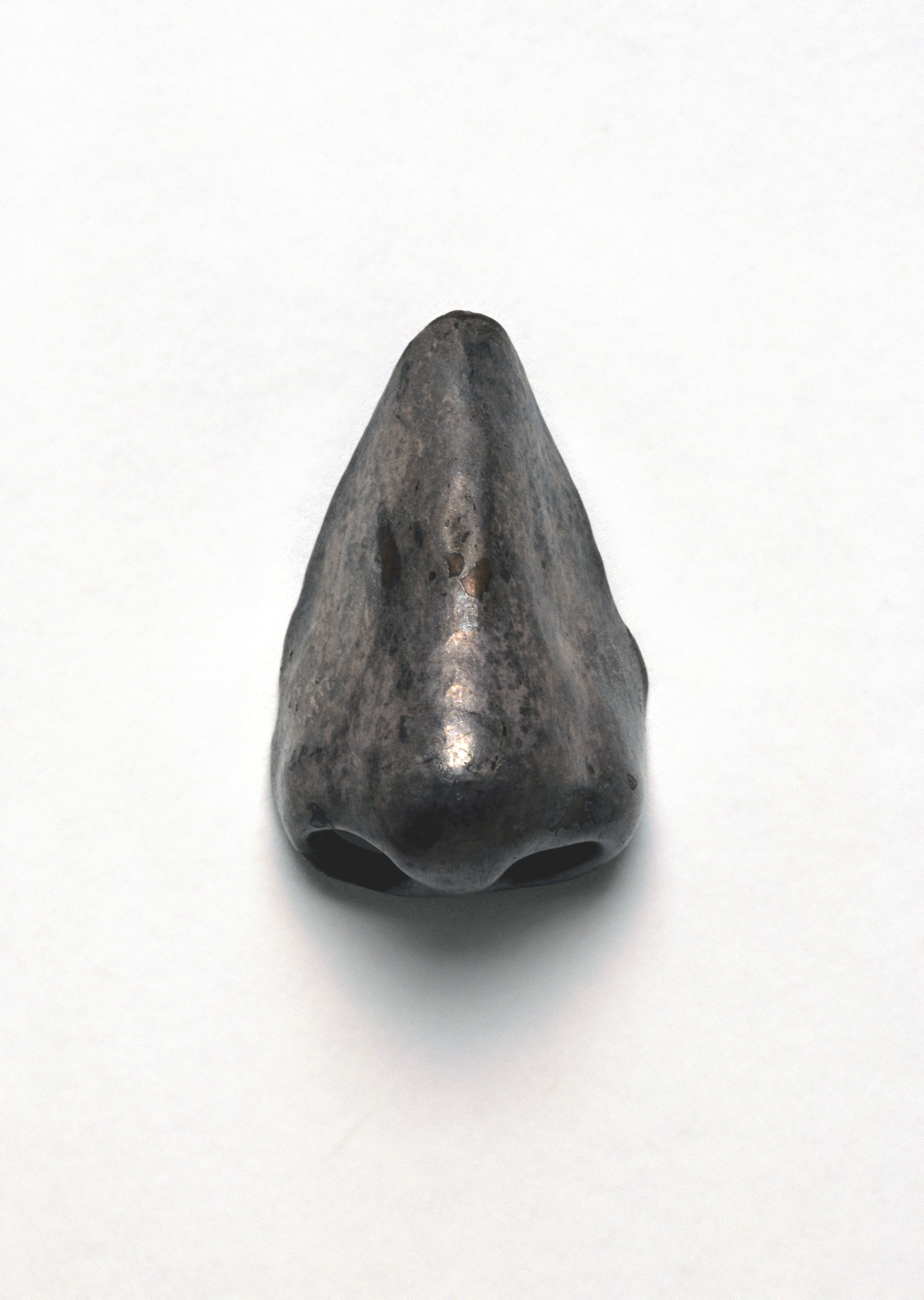
Artificial nose, made of plated metal, 17th–18th century Europe. This would have been worn as an alternative to rhinoplasty.

In Germany, rhinoplastic technique was refined by surgeons such as the Berlin University professor of surgery Karl Ferdinand von Gräfe (1787–1840), who published Rhinoplastik (Rebuilding the Nose, 1818) wherein he described 55 historical plastic surgery procedures, and his technically innovative free-graft nasal reconstruction (with a tissue-flap harvested from the patient's arm), and surgical approaches to eyelid, cleft lip, and cleft palate corrections. Dr. von Gräfe's protégé, the medical and surgical polymath Johann Friedrich Dieffenbach (1794–1847), who was among the first surgeons to anaesthetize the patient before performing the nose surgery, published Die Operative Chirurgie (Operative Surgery, 1845), which became a foundational medical and plastic surgical text (see strabismus, torticollis). Moreover, the Prussian Jacques Joseph (1865–1934) published Nasenplastik und sonstige Gesichtsplastik (Rhinoplasty and other Facial Plastic Surgeries, 1928), which described refined surgical techniques for performing nose-reduction rhinoplasty via internal incisions.

In the United States, in 1887, the otolaryngologist John Orlando Roe (1848–1915) performed the first modern endonasal rhinoplasty (closed rhinoplasty) in order to treat saddle nose deformities. In America June 1894, a successful operation was reported to remove cartilage and "gratify the vanity" of a large nosed individual.

In the early 20th century, Freer, in 1902, and Killian, in 1904, pioneered the submucous resection septoplasty (SMR) procedure for correcting a deviated septum; they raised mucoperichondrial tissue flaps, and resected the cartilaginous and bony septum (including the vomer bone and the perpendicular plate of the ethmoid bone), maintaining septal support with a 1.0-cm margin at the dorsum and a 1.0-cm margin at the caudad, for which innovations the technique became the foundational, standard septoplastic procedure. In 1929, Peer and Metzenbaum performed the first manipulation of the caudal septum, where it originates and projects from the forehead. In 1934, Aurel Rethi introduced the open rhinoplasty approach featuring an incision to the nasal septum to facilitate modifying the tip of the nose. In 1947, Maurice H. Cottle (1898–1981) endonasally resolved a septal deviation with a minimalist hemitransfixion incision, which conserved the septum; thus, he advocated for the practical primacy of the closed rhinoplasty approach. In 1957, A. Sercer advocated the "decortication of the nose" (Dekortication des Nase) technique which featured a columellar-incision open rhinoplasty that allowed greater access to the nasal cavity and to the nasal septum.

The endonasal rhinoplasty was the usual approach to nose surgery until the 1970s, when Padovan presented his technical refinements, advocating the open rhinoplasty approach; he was seconded by Wilfred S. Goodman in the later 1970s, and by Jack P. Gunter in the 1990s. Goodman impelled technical and procedural progress and popularized the open rhinoplasty approach. In 1987, Gunter reported the technical effectiveness of the open rhinoplasty approach for performing a secondary rhinoplasty; his improved techniques advanced the management of a failed nose surgery.

In early 2021, it was reported that a trend that involved getting a rhinoplasty had emerged on the social media platform TikTok. The trend became known as the #NoseJobCheck trend and involved users of the platform posting videos that showed how their noses looked before and after their rhinoplasty surgeries, with a specific audio soundtracking the video. From October 2020 to January 2021, the #NoseJobCheck audio had been used in over 120,000 videos and videos with the #NoseJobCheck hashtag had accumulated over one billion views.

== Anatomy of the human nose ==
=== The structures of the nose ===
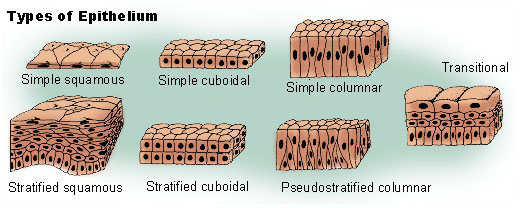
Nasal anatomy: Squamous epithelium is one of several types of epithelia.

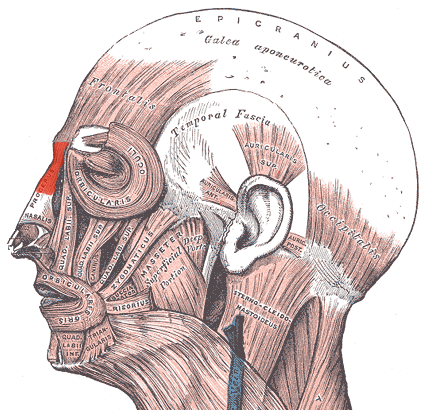
Nasal anatomy: The procerus muscle (musculus procerus, pyramidalis nasi, depressor glabellae).

For plastic surgical correction, the structural anatomy of the nose comprises: A. the nasal soft tissues; B. the aesthetic subunits and segments; C. the blood supply arteries and veins; D. the nasal lymphatic system; E. the facial and nasal nerves; F. the nasal bone; and G. the nasal cartilages.

==== A. The nasal soft tissues ====
- Nasal skin – Like the underlying bone-and-cartilage (osseo-cartilaginous) support framework of the nose, the external skin is divided into vertical thirds (anatomic sections); from the glabella (the space between the eyebrows), to the bridge, to the tip, for corrective plastic surgery, the nasal skin is anatomically considered, as the:
1. Upper third section – the skin of the upper nose is thin, subcutaneous fat layer is thicker and relatively distensible (flexible and mobile), but then tapers, adhering tightly to the osseo-cartilaginous framework, and becomes the thinner skin of the dorsal section, the bridge of the nose.
2. Middle third section – the skin overlying the bridge of the nose (mid-dorsal section) is the thinnest, least distensible, nasal skin, because it most adheres to the support framework.
3. Lower third section – the skin of the lower nose and tip is significantly thicker and less mobile due to a higher density of sebaceous glands. This increased thickness can often efface the underlying cartilaginous framework, requiring more aggressive surgical definition in the tip area. The subcutaneous fat layer is very thin.
- Nasal lining – At the vestibule, the human nose is lined with a mucous membrane of squamous epithelium, which tissue then transitions to become columnar respiratory epithelium, a pseudo-stratified, ciliated (lash-like) tissue with abundant seromucous glands, which maintains the nasal moisture and protects the respiratory tract from bacteriologic infection and foreign objects.
- Nasal muscles – The movements of the human nose are controlled by groups of facial and neck muscles that are set deep to the skin; they are in four functional groups that are interconnected by the nasal superficial aponeurosis—the superficial musculoaponeurotic system (SMAS)—which is a sheet of dense, fibrous, collagenous connective tissue that covers, invests, and forms the terminations of the muscles.

===== The movements of the nose are affected by =====
1. the elevator muscle group – which includes the procerus muscle and the levator labii superioris alaeque nasi muscle.
2. the depressor muscle group – which includes the alar nasalis muscle and the depressor septi nasi muscle.
3. the compressor muscle group – which includes the transverse nasalis muscle.
4. the dilator muscle group – which includes the dilator naris muscle that expands the nostrils; it is in two parts: (i) the dilator nasi anterior muscle, and (ii) the dilator nasi posterior muscle.

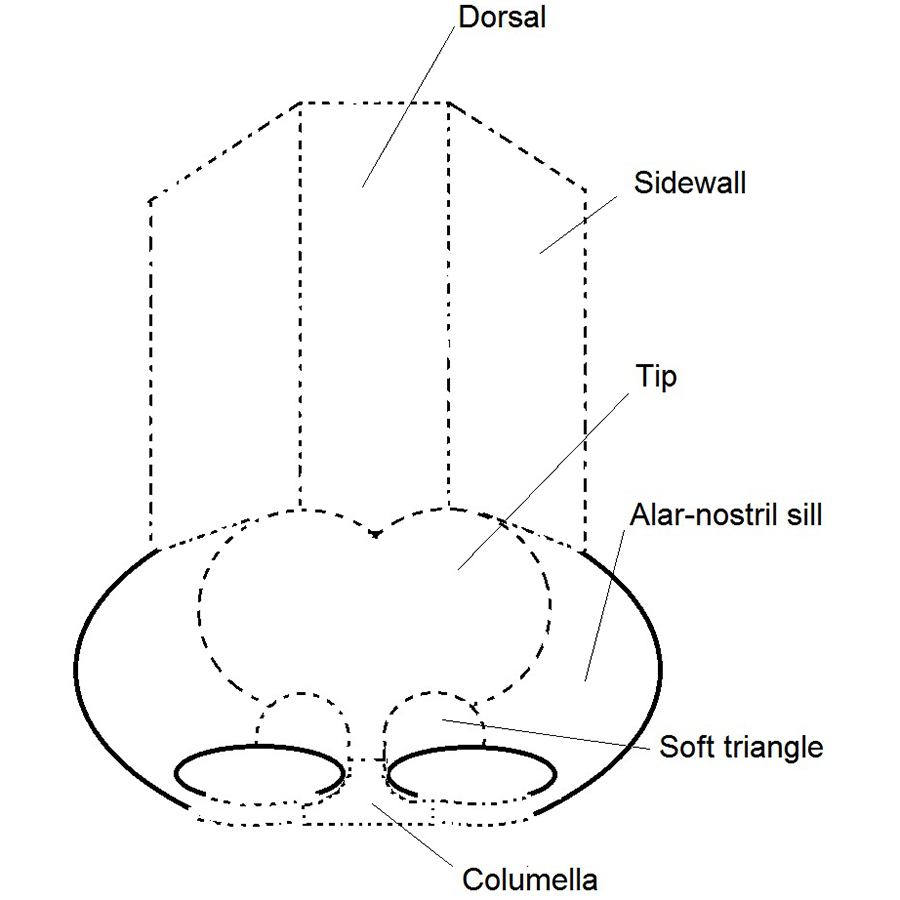
Rhinoplasty: the surgical nose as aesthetic nasal segments.

==== B. Aesthetics of the nose – nasal subunits and nasal segments ====
To plan, map, and execute the surgical correction of a nasal defect or deformity, the structure of the external nose is divided into nine aesthetic nasal subunits, and six aesthetic nasal segments, which provide the plastic surgeon with the measures for determining the size, extent, and topographic locale of the nasal defect or deformity.

===== The surgical nose as nine aesthetic nasal subunits =====
1. tip subunit
2. columellar subunit
3. right alar base subunit
4. right alar wall subunit
5. left alar wall subunit
6. left alar base subunit
7. dorsal subunit
8. right dorsal wall subunit
9. left dorsal wall subunit

In turn, the nine aesthetic nasal subunits are configured as six aesthetic nasal segments; each segment comprehends a nasal area greater than that comprehended by a nasal subunit.

===== The surgical nose as six aesthetic nasal segments =====
1. the dorsal nasal segment
2. the lateral nasal-wall segments
3. the hemi-lobule segment
4. the soft-tissue triangle segments
5. the alar segments
6. the columellar segment

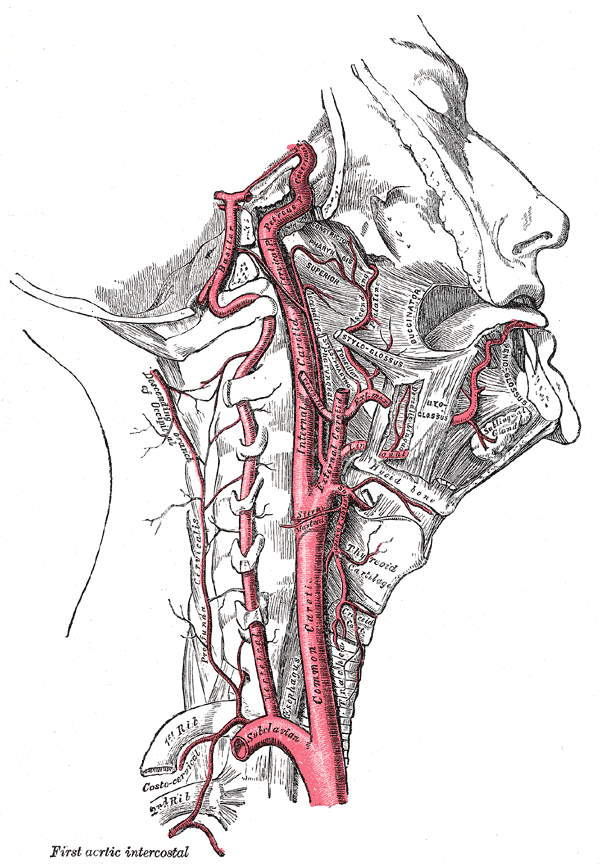
Rhinoplasty: The common carotid artery.

Using the co-ordinates of the subunits and segments to determine the topographic location of the defect on the nose, the plastic surgeon plans, maps, and executes a rhinoplasty procedure. The unitary division of the nasal topography permits minimal, but precise, cutting, and maximal corrective-tissue coverage, to produce a functional nose of proportionate size, contour, and appearance for the patient. Hence, if more than 50 percent of an aesthetic subunit is lost (damaged, defective, destroyed) the surgeon replaces the entire aesthetic segment, usually with a regional tissue graft, harvested from either the face or the head, or with a tissue graft harvested from elsewhere on the patient's body.

==== C. Nasal blood supply – arteries and veins ====
Like the face, the human nose is well vascularized with arteries and veins, and thus supplied with abundant blood. The principal arterial blood-vessel supply to the nose is two-fold: (i) branches from the internal carotid artery, the branch of the anterior ethmoidal artery, the branch of the posterior ethmoidal artery, which derive from the ophthalmic artery; (ii) branches from the external carotid artery, the sphenopalatine artery, the greater palatine artery, the superior labial artery, and the angular artery.

The external nose is supplied with blood by the facial artery, which becomes the angular artery that courses over the superomedial aspect of the nose. The sellar region (sella turcica, "Turkish chair") and the dorsal region of the nose are supplied with blood by branches of the internal maxillary artery (infraorbital artery) and the ophthalmic arteries that derive from the internal common carotid artery system.

Internally, the lateral nasal wall is supplied with blood by the sphenopalatine artery (from behind and below) and by the anterior ethmoid artery and the posterior ethmoid artery (from above and behind). The nasal septum also is supplied with blood by the sphenopalatine artery, and by the anterior and posterior ethmoid arteries, with the additional circulatory contributions of the superior labial artery and of the greater palatine artery. These three vascular supplies to the internal nose converge in the Kiesselbach plexus (the Little area), which is a region in the anteroinferior-third of the nasal septum, (in front and below). Furthermore, the nasal vein vascularisation of the nose generally follows the arterial pattern of nasal vascularisation. The nasal veins are biologically significant, because they have no vessel-valves, and because of their direct, circulatory communication to the cavernous sinus, which makes possible the potential intracranial spreading of a bacterial infection of the nose. Hence, because of such an abundant nasal blood supply, tobacco smoking does therapeutically compromise post-operative healing.

==== D. Lymphatic system of the nose ====
The pertinent nasal lymphatic system arises from the superficial mucosa, and drains posteriorly to the retropharyngeal nodes (in back), and anteriorly (in front), either to the upper deep cervical nodes (in the neck), or to the submandibular glands (in the lower jaw), or into both the nodes and the glands of the neck and the jaw.

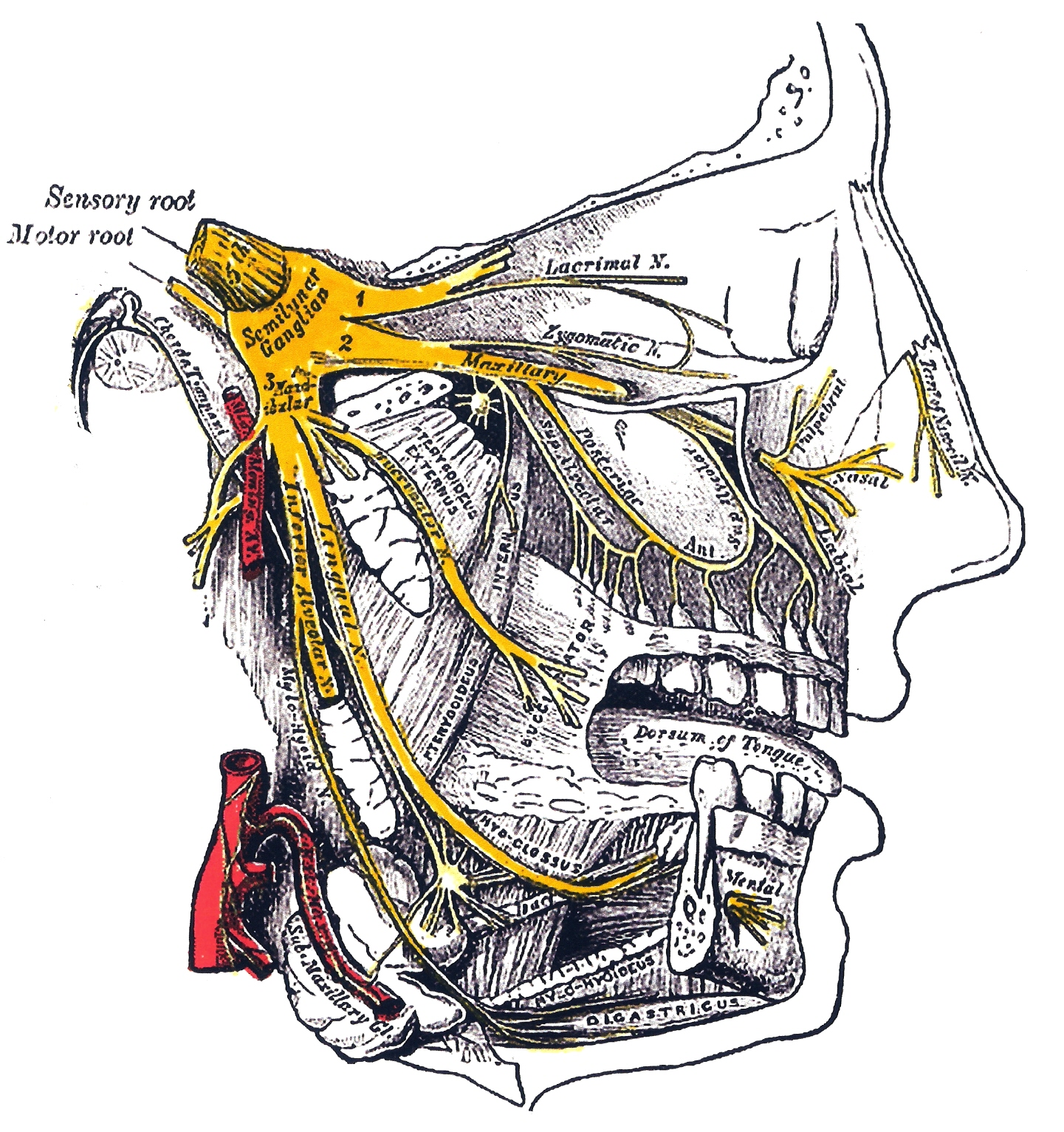
Nasal innervation: Cranial nerve V, the trigeminal nerve (nervus trigeminis) gives sensation to the nose, the face, and the upper jaw (maxilla).

==== E. Nerves of the nose ====
The sensations registered by the human nose derive from the first two branches of cranial nerve V, the trigeminal nerve. The nerve listings indicate the respective innervation (sensory distribution) of the trigeminal nerve branches within the nose, the face, and the upper jaw (maxilla).

Nasal innervation: Cranial nerve VII (nervus facialis) is the facial nerve that gives sensation to the nose and the upper jaw (maxilla).

The indicated nerve serves the named anatomic facial and nasal regions

===== Ophthalmic division innervation =====
- Lacrimal nerve – conveys sensation to the skin areas of the lateral orbital (eye socket) region, except for the lacrimal gland.
- Frontal nerve – conveys sensation to the skin areas of the forehead and the scalp.
- Supraorbital nerve – conveys sensation to the skin areas of the eyelids, the forehead, and the scalp.
- Supratrochlear nerve – conveys sensation to the medial region of the eyelid skin area, and the medial region of the forehead skin.
- Nasociliary nerve – conveys sensation to the skin area of the nose, and the mucous membrane of the anterior (front) nasal cavity.
- Anterior ethmoid nerve – conveys sensation in the anterior (front) half of the nasal cavity: (a) the internal areas of the ethmoid sinus and the frontal sinus; and (b) the external areas, from the nasal tip to the rhinion: the anterior tip of the terminal end of the nasal-bone suture.
- Posterior ethmoid nerve – serves the superior (upper) half of the nasal cavity, the sphenoids, and the ethmoids.
- Infratrochlear nerve – conveys sensation to the medial region of the eyelids, the palpebral conjunctiva, the nasion (nasolabial junction), and the bony dorsum.

===== The maxillary division innervation =====
- Maxillary nerve – conveys sensation to the upper jaw and the face.
- Infraorbital nerve – conveys sensation to the area from below the eye socket to the external nares (nostrils).
- Zygomatic nerve – through the zygomatic bone and the zygomatic arch, conveys sensation to the cheekbone areas.
- Superior posterior dental nerve – sensation in the teeth and the gums.
- Superior anterior dental nerve – mediates the sneeze reflex.
- Sphenopalatine nerve – divides into the lateral branch and the septal branch, and conveys sensation from the rear and the central regions of the nasal cavity.

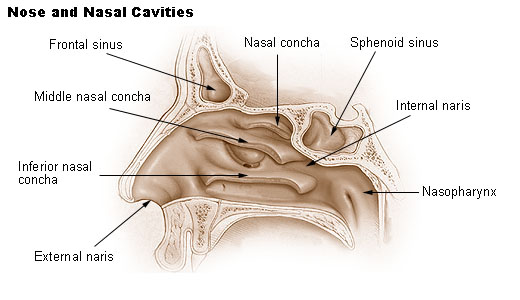
Nasal anatomy: The shell-form turbinates (conchae nasales).

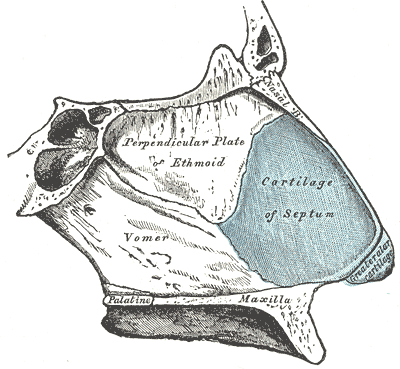
Nasal anatomy: The septum nasi bones and cartilages.

The supply of parasympathetic nerves to the face and the upper jaw (maxilla) derives from the greater superficial petrosal (GSP) branch of cranial nerve VII, the facial nerve. The GSP nerve joins the deep petrosal nerve (of the sympathetic nervous system), derived from the carotid plexus, to form the vidian nerve (in the vidian canal) that traverses the pterygopalatine ganglion (an autonomic ganglion of the maxillary nerve), wherein only the parasympathetic nerves form synapses, which serve the lacrimal gland and the glands of the nose and of the palate, via the (upper jaw) maxillary division of cranial nerve V, the trigeminal nerve.

==== F. Bony anatomy of the nose ====
In the upper portion of the nose, the paired nasal bones attach to the frontal bone. Above and to the side (superolaterally), the paired nasal bones connect to the lacrimal bones, and below and to the side (inferolaterally), they attach to the ascending processes of the maxilla (upper jaw). Above and to the back (posterosuperiorly), the bony nasal septum is composed of the perpendicular plate of the ethmoid bone. The vomer bone lies below and to the back (posteroinferiorly), and partially forms the choanal opening into the nasopharynx, (the upper portion of the pharynx that is continuous with the nasal passages). The floor of the nose comprises the premaxilla bone and the palatine bone, the roof of the mouth.

The nasal septum is composed of the quadrangular cartilage, the vomer bone (the perpendicular plate of the ethmoid bone), aspects of the premaxilla, and the palatine bones. Each lateral nasal wall contains three pairs of turbinates (nasal conchae), which are small, thin, shell-form bones: (i) the superior concha, (ii) the middle concha, and (iii) the inferior concha, which are the bony framework of the turbinates. Lateral to the turbinates is the medial wall of the maxillary sinus. Inferior to the nasal conchae (turbinates) is the meatus space, with names that correspond to the turbinates, e.g. superior turbinate, superior meatus, et alii. The internal roof of the nose is composed by the horizontal, perforated cribriform plate (of the ethmoid bone) through which pass sensory filaments of the olfactory nerve (cranial nerve I); finally, below and behind (posteroinferior) the cribriform plate, sloping down at an angle, is the bony face of the sphenoid sinus.

==== G. The cartilaginous pyramid of the nose ====
The cartilaginous septum (septum nasi) extends from the nasal bones in the midline (above) to the bony septum in the midline (posteriorly), then down along the bony floor. The septum is quadrangular; the upper half is flanked by two triangular-to-trapezoidal cartilages: the upper lateral-cartilages, which are fused to the dorsal septum in the midline, and laterally attached, with loose ligaments, to the bony margin of the pyriform (pear-shaped) aperture, while the inferior ends of the upper lateral-cartilages are free (unattached). The internal area (angle), formed by the septum and upper lateral-cartilage, constitutes the internal valve of the nose; the sesamoid cartilages are adjacent to the upper lateral-cartilages in the fibroareolar connective tissue.

Beneath the upper lateral-cartilages lay the lower lateral-cartilages; the paired lower lateral-cartilages swing outwards, from medial attachments, to the caudal septum in the midline (the medial crura) to an intermediate crus (shank) area. Finally, the lower lateral-cartilages flare outwards, above and to the side (superolaterally), as the lateral crura; these cartilages are mobile, unlike the upper lateral cartilages. Furthermore, some persons present anatomical evidence of nasal scrolling—i.e., an outward curving of the lower borders of the upper lateral-cartilages, and an inward curving of the cephalic borders of the alar cartilages.

=== External nasal anatomy ===
The form of the nasal subunits—the dorsum, the sidewalls, the lobule, the soft triangles, the alae, and the columella—are configured differently, according to the race and the ethnic group of the patient, thus the nasal physiognomies denominated as: African, platyrrhine (flat, wide nose); Asiatic, subplatyrrhine (low, wide nose); Caucasian, leptorrhine (narrow nose); and Hispanic, paraleptorrhine (narrow-sided nose). The respective external nasal valve of each nose is variably dependent upon the size, shape, and strength of the lower lateral cartilage.

=== Internal nasal anatomy ===
In the midline of the nose, the septum is a composite (osseo-cartilaginous) structure that divides the nose into two similar halves. The lateral nasal wall and the paranasal sinuses, the superior concha, the middle concha, and the inferior concha, form the corresponding passages, the superior meatus, the middle meatus, and the inferior meatus, on the lateral nasal wall. The superior meatus is the drainage area for the posterior ethmoid bone cells and the sphenoid sinus; the middle meatus provides drainage for the anterior ethmoid sinuses and for the maxillary and frontal sinuses; and the inferior meatus provides drainage for the nasolacrimal duct.

The internal nasal valve comprises the area bounded by the upper lateral-cartilage, the septum, the nasal floor, and the anterior head of the inferior turbinate. In the narrow (leptorrhine) nose, this is the narrowest portion of the nasal airway. Generally, this area requires an angle greater than 15 degrees for unobstructed breathing; for the correction of such narrowness, the width of the nasal valve can be increased with spreader grafts and flaring sutures.

== Nasal analysis ==
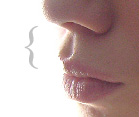
Rhinoplasty. Nasal anatomy: The philtrum.

The surgical management of nasal defects and deformities divides the nose into six anatomic subunits: (i) the dorsum, (ii) the sidewalls (paired), (iii) the hemilobules (paired), (iv) the soft triangles (paired), (v) the alae (paired), and (vi) the columella. Surgical correction and reconstruction comprehend the entire anatomic subunit affected by the defect (wound) or deformity, thus, the entire subunit is corrected, especially when the resection (cutting) of the defect encompasses more than 50 percent of the subunit. Aesthetically, the nose—from the nasion (the midpoint of the nasofrontal junction) to the columella-labial junction—ideally occupies one-third of the vertical dimension of the person's face; and, from ala to ala, it ideally should occupy one-fifth of the horizontal dimension of the person's face.

The nasofrontal angle, intersection of the line from the nasion to the nasal tip with the line from the nasion to the glabella, usually is 115-130 degrees; the nasofrontal angle is more acute in the male face (115-120°) than in the female face (120-130°). The nasofacial angle, intersection of the line from the nasion to the nasal tip with the line from the nasion to the pogonion, is approximately 30–40 degrees, and this angle is roughly similar between men and women. The nasolabial angle, the intersection of the line of the columella and the line from the subnasale to upper lip (eg, philtrum), is approximately 90–95 degrees in the male face, and approximately 100–105 degrees in the female face. Therefore, when observing the nose in profile, the normal show of the columella (the height of the visible nasal aperture) is 2 mm; and the dorsum should be rectilinear (straight). When observed from below (basal view), the alar base configures an isosceles triangle, with its apex at the infra-tip lobule, immediately beneath the tip of the nose. The facially proportionate projection of the nasal tip (the distance of the nose's tip from the face) is determined with the Goode Method, wherein the projection of the nasal tip should be 55–60 percent of the distance between the nasion (nasofrontal junction) and the tip-defining point. A columellar double break might be present, marking the transition between the intermediate crus of the lower-lateral cartilage and the medial crus.

The Goode Method determines the extension of the nose from the facial surface by comprehending the distance from the alar groove to the tip of the nose, and then relating that measurement (of nasal-tip projection) to the length of the nasal dorsum (eg, the line from the nasion to the nasal tip). The nasal projection measurement is obtained by delineating a right triangle with lines parting from the nasion (nasofrontal juncture) to the alar–facial–groove. Then, a second, perpendicular delineation, that traverses the tip-defining point, establishes the ratio of projection of the nasal tip; hence, the range of 0.55:1 to 0.60:1, is the ideal nasal-tip-to-nasal-length projection. According to Crumley and Lanser, the ideal dimensions of the right triangle formed by the nasion, alar crease, and nasal tip are 3-4-5 (hence 0.6 to 1 ratio).

Systematic approaches to nasal analysis have been described. For example, the 10-7-5 method allows for methodical analysis of the nose. It describes 10 features from the frontal view, 7 features from the lateral view, and 5 features from the basal view.

3D simulations and planning can be used to communicate the patients existing deformities, and plan or propose the desired approach. 3-dimensional cameras allow photographic capture, inspection, analysis, and modification to understand the existing nasal anatomy, and communicate a potential result to the patient.

== Patient characteristics ==
To determine the patient's suitability for undergoing a rhinoplasty procedure, the surgeon clinically evaluates them with a complete medical history (anamnesis) to determine their physical and psychological health. The prospective patient must explain to the physician–surgeon the functional and aesthetic nasal problems that they have. The surgeon asks about the ailments' symptoms and their duration, past surgical interventions, allergies, drugs use and drugs abuse (prescription and commercial medications), and a general medical history. Furthermore, additional to physical suitability is psychological suitability—the patient's psychological motive for undergoing nose surgery is critical to the surgeon's pre-operative evaluation of the patient.

The complete physical examination of the rhinoplasty patient determines if he or she is physically fit to undergo and tolerate the physiologic stresses of nose surgery. The examination comprehends every existing physical problem, and a consultation with an anaesthesiologist, if warranted by the patient's medical data. Specific facial and nasal evaluations record the patient's skin-type, existing surgical scars, and the symmetry and asymmetry of the aesthetic nasal subunits. The external and internal nasal examination concentrates upon the anatomic thirds of the nose—upper section, middle section, lower section—specifically noting their structures; the measures of the nasal angles (at which the external nose projects from the face); and the physical characteristics of the naso-facial bony and soft tissues. The internal examination evaluates the condition of the nasal septum, the internal and external nasal valves, the turbinates, and the nasal lining, paying special attention to the structure and the form of the nasal dorsum and the tip of the nose.

Furthermore, when warranted, specific tests—the mirror test, vasoconstriction examinations, and the Cottle maneuver—are included to the pre-operative evaluation of the prospective rhinoplasty patient. Established by Maurice H. Cottle (1898–1981), the Cottle maneuver is a principal diagnostic technique for detecting an internal nasal-valve disorder; whilst the patient gently inspires, the surgeon laterally pulls the patient's cheek, thereby simulating the widening of the cross-sectional area of the corresponding internal nasal valve. If the maneuver notably facilitates the patient's inspiration, that result is a positive Cottle sign—which generally indicates an airflow-correction to be surgically effected with an installed spreader-graft. Said correction will improve the internal angle of the nasal valve and thus allow unobstructed breathing. Nonetheless, the Cottle maneuver occasionally yields a false-positive Cottle sign, usually observed in the patient affected by alar collapse, and in the patient with a scarred nasal-valve region.

== Surgical rhinoplasty ==
There is limited evidence that a single dose of corticosteroids decreases oedema and bleeding first two days post operation but the difference is not maintained after this. Swelling and edema can take at least 1-year to diminish. Certain adjuncts, including fat grafting may help quicken the time to edema and bruising resolution.

=== Open rhinoplasty versus closed rhinoplasty ===
The plastic surgical correction of congenital and acquired abnormalities of the nose restores functional and aesthetic properties by the surgeon's manipulations of the nasal skin, the subcutaneous (underlying) cartilage-and-bone support framework, and the mucous membrane lining. Technically, the plastic surgeon's incisional approach classifies the nasal surgery either as an open rhinoplasty or as a closed rhinoplasty procedure. In open rhinoplasty, the surgeon makes a small, irregular incision to the columella, the fleshy, exterior-end of the nasal septum; this columellar incision is additional to the usual set of incisions for a nasal correction. Typically the columellar incision is paired with bilateral marginal (eg, infracartilaginous) incisions to open the nose. In closed rhinoplasty, the surgeon performs every procedural incision endonasally (exclusively within the nose), and does not cut the columella.

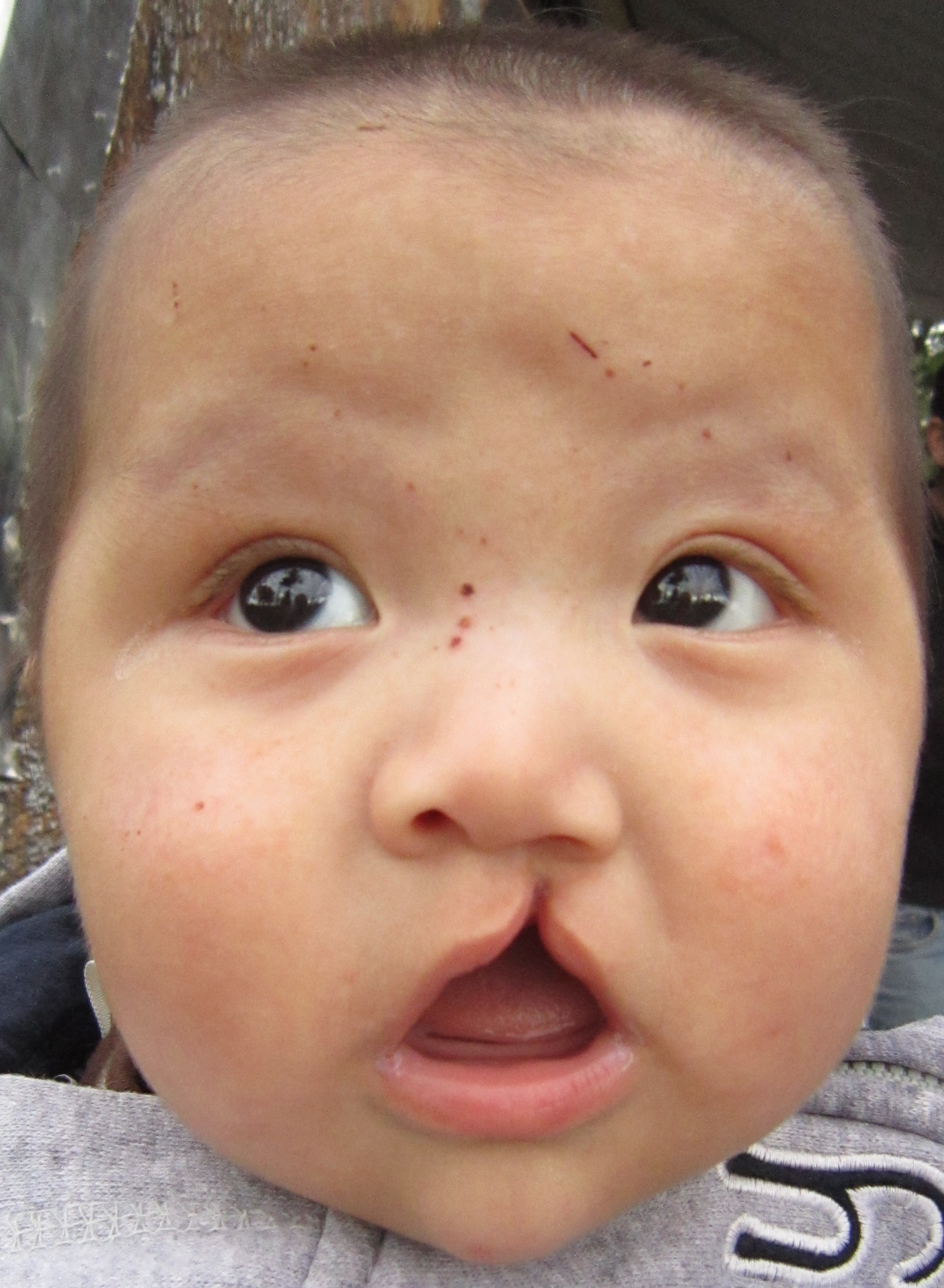
Rhinoplastic correction: A child affected by a cleft lip and a cleft palate.

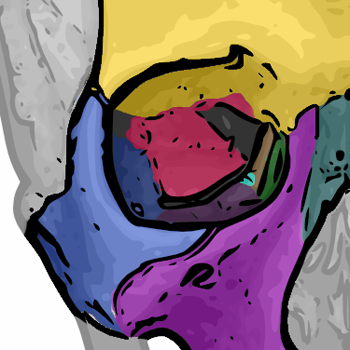
Rhinoplasty: In relation to the nasal bone (teal green), seven bones compose the orbit: (1) the frontal bone (yellow) (2) the lacrimal bone (green) (3) the ethmoid bone (brown) (4) the zygomatic bone (blue) (5) the upper jaw maxillary bone (purple) (6) the palatine bone (aqua) (7) the sphenoid bone (red)

==== Procedural differences ====
Except for the columellar incision, the technical and procedural approaches of open rhinoplasty and of closed rhinoplasty are similar; yet closed rhinoplasty procedure features:

- Reduced dissection (cutting) of the nasal tissues—no columellar incision
- Decreased potential for the excessive reduction (cutting) of the nasal-tip support
- Reduced post-operative edema
- Decreased visible scarring
- Decreased iatrogenic (inadvertent) damage to the nose, by the surgeon
- Increased availability for effecting in situ procedural and technical changes
- Palpation that allows the surgeon to feel the interior changes effected to the nose
- Shorter operating room time
- Quicker post-surgical recovery and convalescence for the patient

On the other hand, benefits of an open procedure include better visualization for surgical access, granting the surgeon greater tip precision. The open approach is therefore usually preferred for revision rhinoplasty.

While the open technique provides direct visualization and greater control in complex cases, systematic reviews and meta-analyses show no significant difference in long-term functional or aesthetic outcomes (eg, NOSE and ROE scores) when compared to the closed approach. The choice of approach is primarily driven by surgeon expertise and the specific anatomical requirements of the patient.

==== The "ethnic nose" ====
The open rhinoplasty approach affords the plastic surgeon advantages of ease in securing grafts (skin, cartilage, bone) and, most importantly, in securing the nasal cartilage properly, and so better to make the appropriate assessment and remedy. This procedural aspect can be especially difficult in revision surgery, and in rhinoplastic alteration of the thick-skinned "ethnic nose" of the person of color. The study, Ethnic Rhinoplasty: a Universal Preoperative Classification System for the Nasal Tip (2009), reports that a nasal-tip classification system, based upon skin thickness, has been proposed to aid the surgeon in determining if an open rhinoplasty or a closed rhinoplasty can best correct the defect or deformity affecting the patient's nose.

==== Cause ====
Cause, the open and closed approaches to rhinoplastic correction resolve: (i) nasal pathologies (diseases intrinsic and diseases extrinsic to the nose); (ii) an unsatisfactory aesthetic appearance (disproportion); (iii) a failed primary rhinoplasty; (iv) an obstructed airway; and (v) congenital nose defects and deformities.

==== Congenital abnormalities ====
- Cleft lip and palate in combination; cleft lip (cheiloschisis) and cleft palate (palatoschisis), individually.
- Congenital nasal abnormalities
- Genetically derived ethnic-nose abnormalities

==== Acquired abnormalities ====
- Allergic and vasomotor rhinitis – inflammations of the mucous membrane of the nose caused by an allergen, and caused by circulatory and nervous system disorders.
- Autoimmune system diseases
- Bites – animal and human
- Burns – caused by chemicals, electricity, friction, heat, light, and radiation.
- Connective-tissue diseases
- Inflammatory conditions
- Nasal fractures
- Naso-orbito-ethmoidal fractures – damages to the nose and the eye-sockets; and damage to the bones and the walls of the nasal cavity; it is the ethmoid bone that separates the brain from the nose.
- Neoplasms – malignant and benign tumors
- Septal hematoma – a mass of (usually) clotted blood in the septum
- Toxins – chemical damages caused by inspired substances – e.g. powdered cocaine, aerosol antihistamine medications, et cetera.
- Traumatic deformities caused by blunt trauma, penetrating trauma, and blast trauma.
- Venereal infection – e.g., syphilis

=== Ultrasonic rhinoplasty ===
Recently, ultrasonic rhinoplasty which was introduced by Massimo Robiony in 2004 has become an alternative to traditional rhinoplasty. Ultrasonic rhinoplasty uses piezoelectric instruments to reshape atraumatically nasal bones, also known as rhinosculpture. Ultrasonic rhinoplasty uses piezoelectric instruments (scrapers rasps, saws) that affect only the bones and the stiff cartilages through ultrasonic vibrations, as the instruments used in dental surgery. The use of piezoelectric instruments requires a more extended approach than the isial one, allowing to visualize the whole bony vault, to reshape it with rhinosculpture or to mobilize and stabilize bones after controlled osteotomies.

== Surgical procedure ==
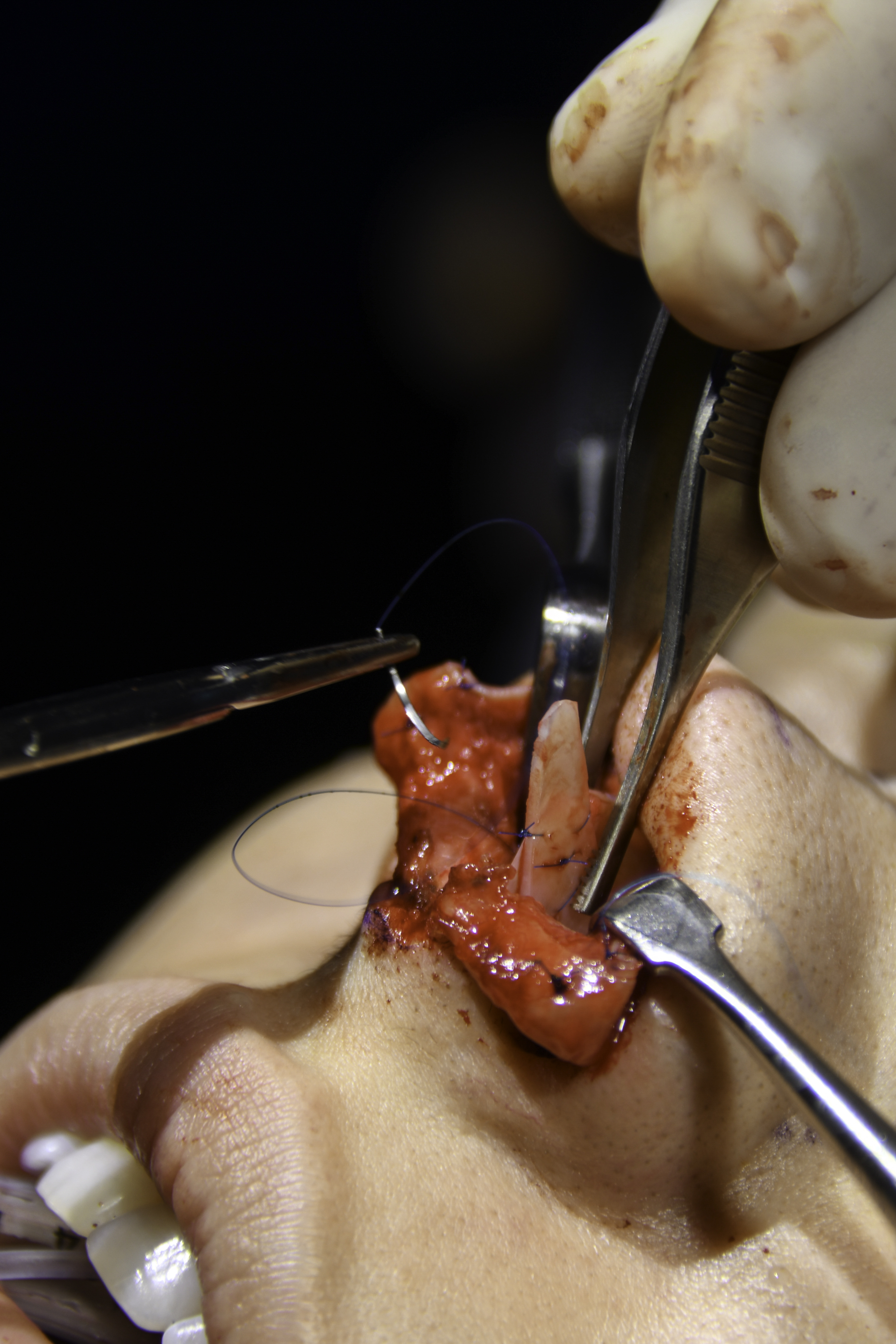
Cartilage graft placement during open rhinoplasty to support and refine nasal structure

A rhinoplastic correction can be performed on a person who is under sedation, under general anaesthesia, or under local anaesthesia; initially, a local anaesthetic mixture of lidocaine and epinephrine is injected to numb the area, and temporarily reduce vascularity, thereby limiting any bleeding. Generally, the plastic surgeon first separates the nasal skin and the soft tissues from the osseo-cartilagenous nasal framework, and then reshapes them, sutures the incisions, and applies either an external or an internal stent, and tape, to immobilize the newly reconstructed nose, and so facilitate the healing of the surgical cuts. Occasionally, the surgeon uses either an autologous cartilage graft or a bone graft, or both, in order to strengthen or to alter the nasal contour(s). The autologous grafts usually are harvested from the nasal septum, but, if it has insufficient cartilage (as can occur in a revision rhinoplasty), then either a costal cartilage graft (from the rib cage) or an auricular cartilage graft (concha from the ear) is harvested from the patient's body. Homologous (donor) rib cartilage is also sometimes used if the patient's own cartilage is unsuitable. When the rhinoplasty requires a bone graft, it is harvested from either the cranium, the hips, or the rib cage; moreover, when neither type of autologous graft is available, a synthetic graft (nasal implant) is used to augment the nasal bridge. The main types of grafts to support and reposition the nasal tip (or the central/medial limb of the tripod) are either columellar strut, or the septal extension graft. Both are useful and effective, but the septal extension graft (SEG) is shown to impart greater control, and less changes over time.

=== Photographic records ===
For the benefit of the patient and the physician–surgeon, a photographic history of the entire rhinoplastic procedure is established; beginning at the pre-operative consultation, continuing during the surgical operation procedures, and concluding with the post-operative outcome. To record the "before-and-after" physiognomies of the nose and the face of the patient, the specific visual perspectives required are photographs of the nose viewed from the anteroposterior (front-to-back) perspective; the lateral view (profiles), the worm's-eye view (from below), the bird's-eye view (overhead), and three-quarter-profile views.

- Photograph A. – Open rhinoplasty: At rhinoplasty's end, after the plastic surgeon has sutured (closed) the incisions, the corrected (new) nose will be dressed, taped, and splinted immobile to permit the uninterrupted healing of the surgical incisions. The purple-ink guidelines ensured the surgeon's accurate cutting of the defect correction plan.
- Photograph B. – Open rhinoplasty: The new nose is prepared with paper tape in order to receive the metal nasal-splint that will immobilize it to maintain its correct shape as a new nose.
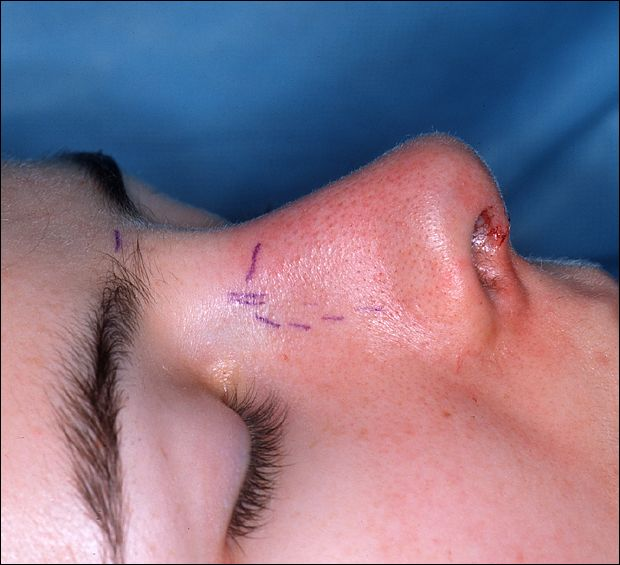
Photograph A. Open rhinoplasty:
Pre-operative, the guidelines (purple) ensured the surgeon's accurate incisions in cutting the nasal defect correction plan.

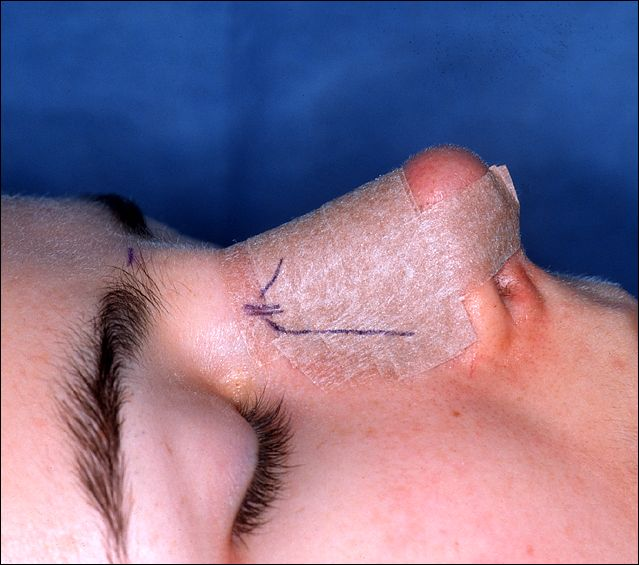
Photograph B. Open rhinoplasty:
Post-operative, the taped nose, prepared to receive the metal nasal splint that immobilizes and protects the newly corrected nose.

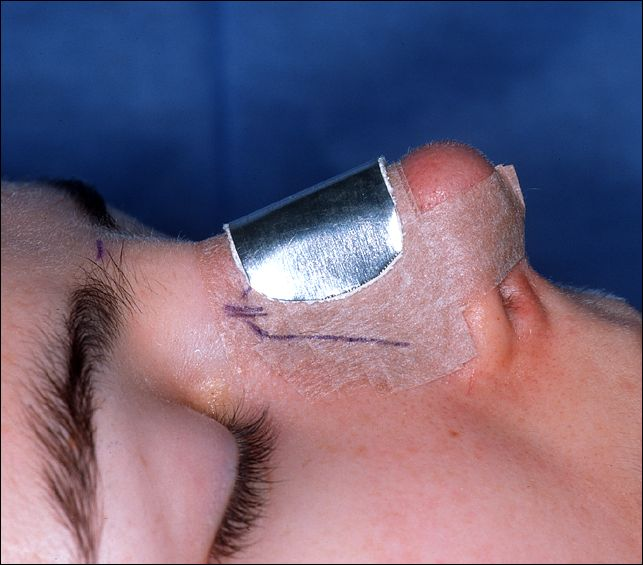
Photograph C. Open rhinoplasty:
The metal nasal splint aids wound healing by protecting the tender tissues of the new nose.

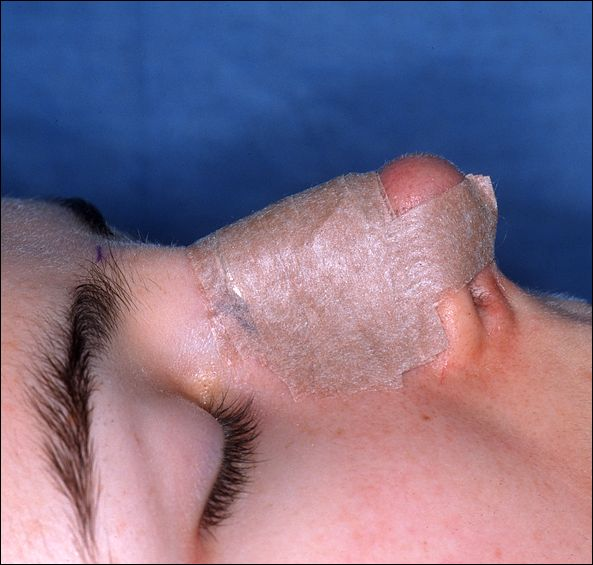
Photograph D. Open rhinoplasty:
The taped, splinted, and dressed nose completes the rhinoplasty.
- Photograph C. – Open rhinoplasty: After the preliminary taping of the nose, a custom-made, metal nasal-splint, designed, cut, and formed by the surgeon, is emplaced to immobilize and protect the tender tissues of the new nose during convalescence.
- Photograph D. – Open rhinoplasty: The taping, emplacement of the metal splint, and dressing of the new nose complete the rhinoplasty procedure. The patient then convalesces, and the wound dressing will be removed at 1-week post-procedure.

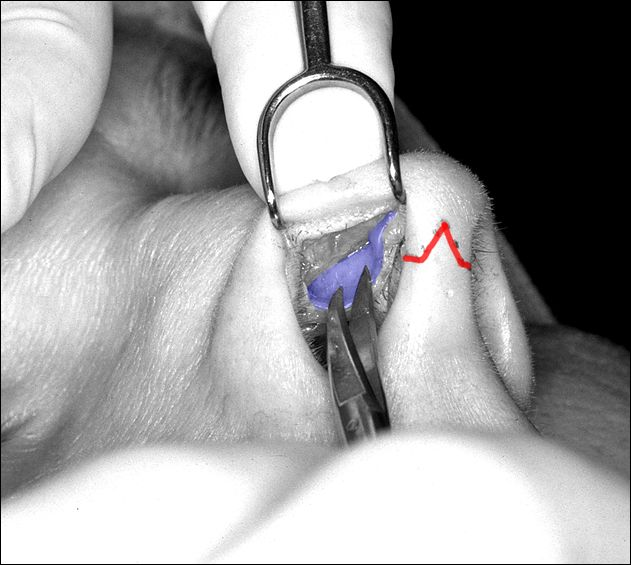
Photograph 2. Open rhinoplasty: The right lower lateral cartilage (blue) is exposed for correction.

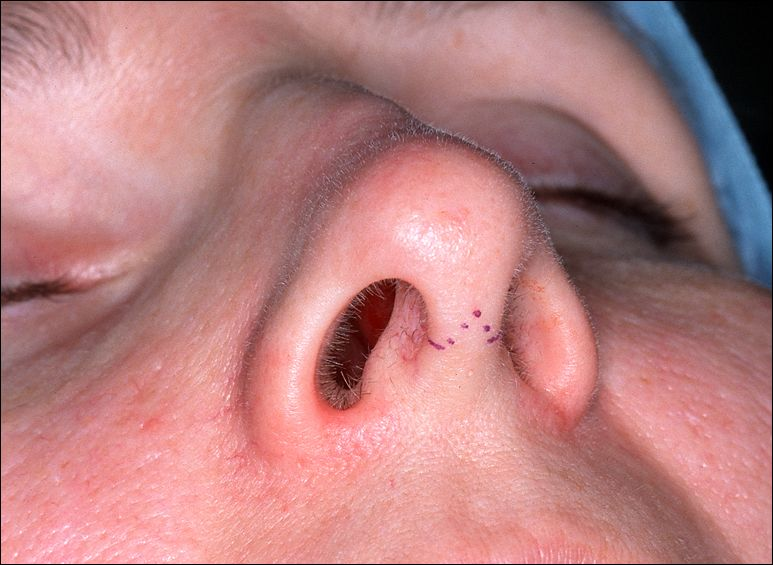
Photograph 1. Open rhinoplasty: The columellar incision delineated as a red-dot guideline, will assist the surgeon in the precise suturing of the nose.

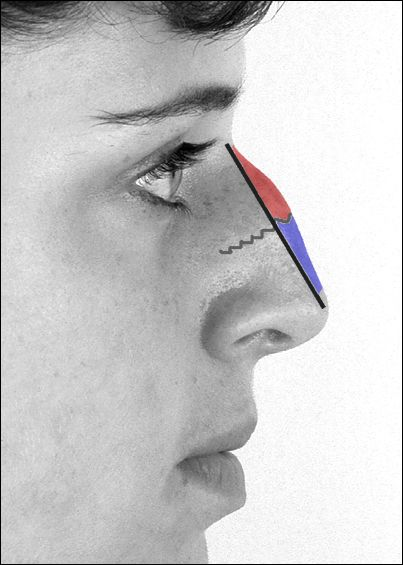
Photograph 4. Rhinoplastic correction: A nasal-hump excision plan; the black line delineates the dorsal plane of the new nose.

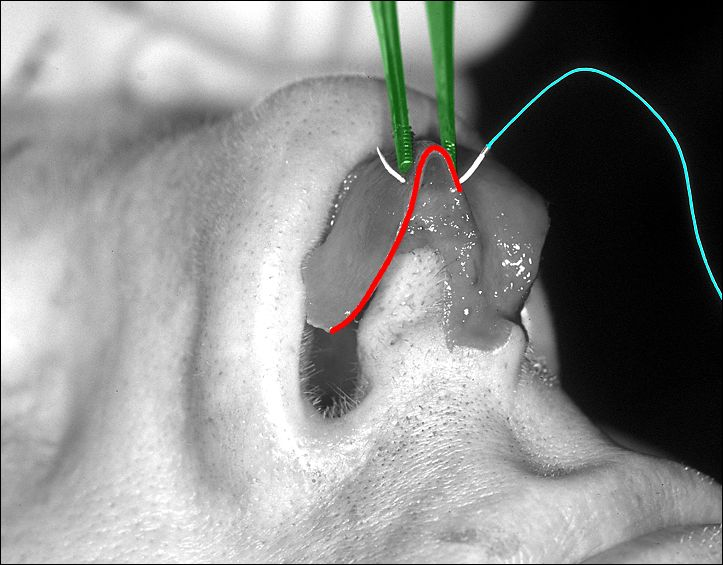
Photograph 3. Open rhinoplasty: the nasal tip is sutured to narrow the nose.

- Photograph 1. – Open rhinoplasty: The incisions are endonasal (in the nose), and thus are hidden. The skin-incision to the columella aids the plastic surgeon in precisely suturing to hide the scar—except for the columellar incision (red-dot guideline) across the nasal base. The columellar incision allows the surgeon to view the size, shape, and condition of the nasal cartilages and bones to be corrected.
- Photograph 2. – Open rhinoplasty: The nasal interior. The scissors indicate the lower lateral cartilage (blue), which is one of the wing-shaped cartilages that conform the tip of the nose. The jagged red delineation indicates the locale of the columellar incision. Once the skin has been lifted from the bone-and-cartilage framework, the surgeon performs the nasal correction tasks.
- Photograph 3. – Open rhinoplasty: To narrow the tip of a too-wide nose, the surgeon first determines the cause of the excess nasal width. The suture being emplaced will narrow the tip of the nose. The red delineation indicates the edge of the nose-tip cartilage, which is narrowed when the surgeon tightens the folded cartilage apex. The suture (light blue) ends in the needle (white); tweezers (green) hold the nasal cartilage in place for the suturing.
- Photograph 4. – Nasal hump excision: The black delineation indicates the desired nose-reduction outcome: a straight nose. The nasal hump is bone (red) above the scalloped grey line, and cartilage (blue) below the scalloped grey line. The surgeon cuts the cartilage portion of the hump with a scalpel, and chisels the bone portion with an osteotome (bone chisel). After chiselling away the main mass of the nasal hump with an osteotome, the surgeon then sculpts, refines, and smoothens the cut nasal bones with rasps (files).
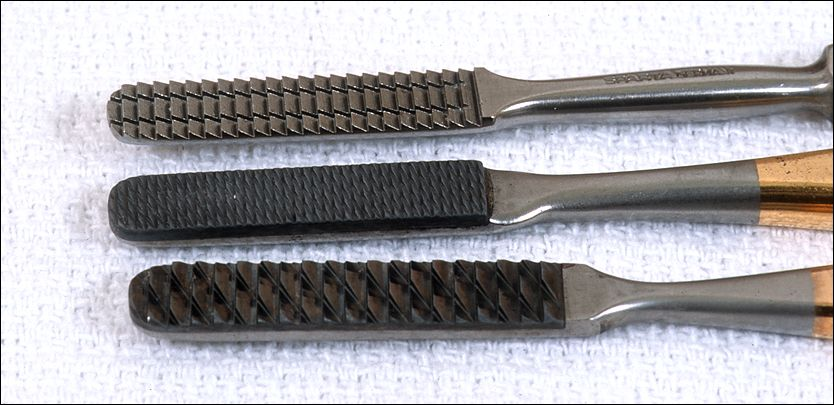
Rhinoplastic instruments:
Bone-scraping rasps, of various grades and types, that the plastic surgeon uses to refine the corrections required to produce a new nose.

=== Types of rhinoplasty ===
In plastic surgical praxis, the term primary rhinoplasty denotes an initial (first-time) reconstructive, functional, or aesthetic corrective procedure. The term secondary rhinoplasty denotes the revision of a failed rhinoplasty, an occurrence in 5–20 per cent of rhinoplasty operations, hence a revision rhinoplasty. The corrections usual to secondary rhinoplasty include the cosmetic reshaping of the nose because of a functional breathing deficit from an over aggressive rhinoplasty, asymmetry, deviated or crooked nose, areas of collapses, hanging columella, pinched tip, scooped nose and more. Although most revision rhinoplasty procedures are "open approach", such a correction is more technically complicated, usually because the nasal support structures either were deformed or destroyed in the primary rhinoplasty; thus the surgeon must re-create the nasal support with cartilage grafts harvested either from the ear (auricular cartilage graft) or from the rib cage (costal cartilage graft).

A functional rhinoplasty refers to a rhinoplasty performed to alleviate nasal obstruction, whereas a cosmetic rhinoplasty refers to a rhinoplasty performed for aesthetic reasons. Procedures performed as part of a functional rhinoplasty typically include septoplasty, inferior turbinate reduction, and spreader graft placement.

Results

Can be good if performed by an experienced practitioner. As in all plastic surgery procedures, there can be some unpredictability, and biologic systems can heal in different ways.

=== Nasal reconstruction ===
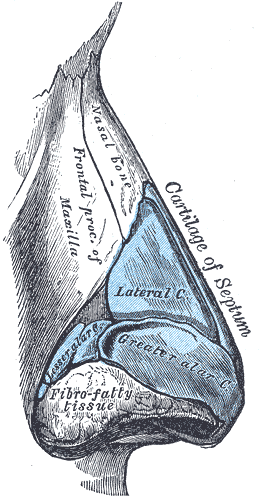
Rhinoplasty: Right lateral view of the nasal cartilages and the nasal bone.

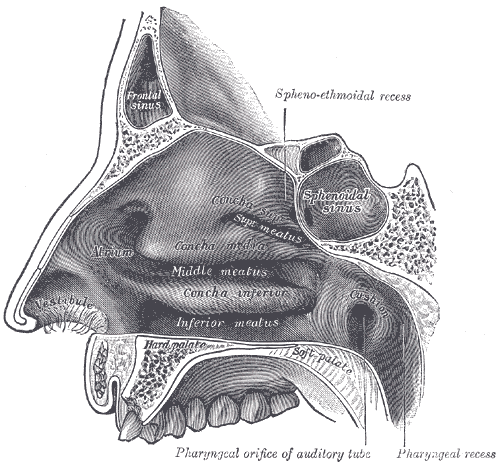
Rhinoplasty: Lateral wall of the nasal cavity.

In reconstructive rhinoplasty, the defects and deformities that the plastic surgeon encounters, and must restore to normal function, form, and appearance include broken and displaced nasal bones; disrupted and displaced nasal cartilages; a collapsed bridge of the nose; congenital defect, trauma (blunt, penetrating, blast), autoimmune disorder, cancer, intranasal drug-abuse damages, and failed primary rhinoplasty outcomes. Rhinoplasty reduces bony humps, and re-aligns the nasal bones after they are cut (dissected, resected). When cartilage is disrupted, suturing for re-suspension (structural support), or the use of cartilage grafts to camouflage a depression allow the re-establishment of the normal nasal contour of the nose for the patient. When the bridge of the nose is collapsed, rib-cartilage, ear-cartilage, or cranial-bone grafts can be used to restore its anatomic integrity, and thus the aesthetic continuity of the nose. For augmenting the nasal dorsum, autologous cartilage and bone grafts are preferred to (artificial) nose prostheses, because of the reduced incidence of histologic rejection and medical complications.

=== Surgical anatomy for nasal reconstruction ===
The human nose is a sensory organ that is structurally composed of three types of tissue: (i) an osseo-cartilaginous support framework (nasal skeleton), (ii) a mucous membrane lining, and (iii) an external skin. The anatomic topography of the human nose is a graceful blend of convexities, curves, and depressions, the contours of which show the underlying shape of the nasal skeleton. Hence, these anatomic characteristics permit dividing the nose into nasal subunits: (i) the midline (ii) the nose-tip, (iii) the dorsum, (iv) the soft triangles, (v) the alar lobules, and (vi) the lateral walls. Surgically, the borders of the nasal subunits are ideal locations for the scars, whereby is produced a superior aesthetic outcome, a corrected nose with corresponding skin colors and skin textures.

Nasal skeleton

Therefore, the successful rhinoplastic outcome depends entirely upon the respective maintenance or restoration of the anatomic integrity of the nasal skeleton, which comprises (a) the nasal bones and the ascending processes of the maxilla in the upper third; (b) the paired upper-lateral cartilages in the middle third; and (c) the lower-lateral, alar cartilages in the lower third. Hence, managing the surgical reconstruction of a damaged, defective, or deformed nose, requires that the plastic surgeon manipulate three anatomic layers:

1. the osseo-cartilagenous framework – The upper lateral cartilages that are tightly attached to the (rear) caudal edge of the nasal bones and the nasal septum; said attachment suspends them above the nasal cavity. The paired alar cartilages configure a tripod-shaped union that supports the lower third of the nose. The paired medial crura conform the central-leg of the tripod, which is attached to the anterior nasal spine and septum, in the midline. The lateral crura compose the second-leg and the third-leg of the tripod, and are attached to the (pear-shaped) pyriform aperture, the nasal-cavity opening at the front of the skull. The dome of the nostrils defines the apex of the alar cartilage, which supports the nasal tip, and is responsible for the light reflex of the tip.
2. the nasal lining – A thin layer of vascular mucosa that adheres tightly to the deep surface of the bones and the cartilages of the nose. Said dense adherence to the nasal interior limits the mobility of the mucosa, consequently, only the smallest of mucosal defects (< 5 mm) can be sutured primarily.
3. the nasal skin – A tight envelope that proceeds inferiorly from the glabella (the smooth prominence between the eyebrows), which then becomes thinner and progressively inelastic (less distensible). The skin of the mid-third of the nose covers the cartilaginous dorsum and the upper lateral cartilages and is relatively elastic, but, at the (far) distal-third of the nose, the skin adheres tightly to the alar cartilages, and is little distensible. The skin and the underlying soft tissues of the alar lobule form a semi-rigid anatomic unit that maintains the graceful curve of the alar rim, and the patency (openness) of the nostrils (anterior nares). To preserve this nasal shape and patency, the replacement of the alar lobule must include a supporting cartilage graft—despite the alar lobule not originally containing cartilage. Due to its many sebaceous glands, the nasal skin is usually a smooth (oiled) texture. Moreover, regarding scarrification, when compared to the skin of other facial areas, the skin of the nose generates fine-line scars that are usually inconspicuous, which allows the surgeon to strategically hide the surgical scars.

=== Principles of rhinoplastic reconstruction ===
Principles

The technical principles for the surgical reconstruction of a nose derive from the essential operative principles of plastic surgery: that the applied procedure and technique(s) yield the most satisfactory functional and aesthetic outcome. Hence, the rhinoplastic reconstruction of a new nasal subunit, of virtually normal appearance, can be done in a few procedural stages, using intranasal tissues to correct defects of the mucosa; cartilage battens to brace against tissue contraction and depression (topographic collapse); axial skin flaps designed from three-dimensional (3-D) templates derived from the topographic subunits of the nose; and the refinement of the resultant correction with the subcutaneous sculpting of bone, cartilage, and flesh. Nonetheless, the physician-surgeon and the rhinoplasty patient must abide the fact that the reconstructed nasal subunit is not a nose proper, but a collagen-glued collage—of forehead skin, cheek skin, mucosa, vestibular lining, nasal septum, and fragments of ear cartilage—which is perceived as a nose only because its contour, skin color, and skin texture are true to the original nose.

Restoration

In nasal reconstruction, the plastic surgeon's ultimate goal is recreating the shadows, the contours, the skin color, and the skin texture that define the patient's "normal nose", as perceived at conversational distance (c. 1.0 metre). Yet, such an aesthetic outcome suggests the application of a more complex surgical approach, which requires that the surgeon balance the patient's required rhinoplasty, with the patient's aesthetic ideal (body image). In the context of surgically reconstructing the patient's physiognomy, the "normal nose" is the three-dimensional (3-D) template for replacing the missing part(s) of a nose (aesthetic nasal subunit, aesthetic nasal segment), which the plastic surgeon re-creates using firm, malleable, modelling materials—such as bone, cartilage, and flaps of skin and of tissue. In repairing a partial nasal defect (wound), such as that of the alar lobule (the dome above the nostrils), the surgeon uses the undamaged, opposite (contralateral) side of the nose as the 3-D model to fabricate the anatomic template for recreating the deformed nasal subunit, by molding the malleable template material directly upon the normal, undamaged nasal anatomy. To effect a total nasal reconstruction, the template might derive from quotidian observations of the "normal nose" and from photographs of the patient before they sustained the nasal damage.

The surgeon replaces missing parts with tissue of like quality and quantity; nasal lining with mucosa, cartilage with cartilage, bone with bone, and skin with skin that best match the native skin color and skin texture of the damaged nasal subunit. For such surgical repairs, skin flaps are preferable to skin grafts, because skin flaps generally are the superior remedy for matching the color and the texture of nasal skin, better resist tissue contracture, and provide better vascularisation of the nasal skeleton; thus, when there is sufficient skin to allow tissue harvesting, nasal skin is the best source of nasal skin. Furthermore, despite its notable scarring propensity, the nasal skin flap is the prime consideration for nasal reconstruction, because of its greater verisimilitude.

The most effective nasal reconstruction for repairing a defect (wound) of the nasal skin, is to re-create the entire nasal subunit; thus, the wound is enlarged to comprehend the entire nasal subunit. Technically, this surgical principle permits laying the scars in the topographic transition zone(s) between and among adjacent aesthetic subunits, which avoids juxtaposing two different types of skin in the same aesthetic subunit, where the differences of color and texture might prove too noticeable, even when reconstructing a nose with skin flaps. Nonetheless, in the final stage of nasal reconstruction—replicating the "normal nose" anatomy by subcutaneous sculpting, the surgeon does have technical allowance to revise the scars, and render them (more) inconspicuous.

=== Reasons for reconstruction ===
Rhinoplasty: A melanoma lesion, a type of skin cancer that occurs to the nasal skin.

Reconstruction rhinoplasty is indicated for the correction of defects and deformities caused by:

1. Skin cancer. The most common cause (etiology) for a nasal reconstruction is skin cancer, especially the lesions to the nose of melanoma and basal-cell carcinoma. This oncologic epidemiology occurs more readily among the aged and people who reside in very sunny geographic areas; although every type of skin is susceptible to skin cancer, white-skin is most epidemiologically prone to developing skin cancer. Furthermore, regarding plastic surgical scars, the age of the patient is a notable factor in the timely, post-surgical healing of a skin cancer defect (lesion); in terms of scarrification, the very elastic skin of young people has a greater regenerative propensity for producing scars that are thicker (stronger) and more noticeable. Therefore, in young patients, the strategic placement (hiding) of the rhinoplastic scars is a greater aesthetic consideration than in elder patients; whose less elastic skin produces scars that are narrower and less noticeable.
2. Traumatic nasal defect. Although trauma is a less common rhinoplastic occurrence, a nasal defect or deformity caused by blunt trauma (impact), penetrating trauma (piercing), and blast trauma (blunt and penetrating) requires a surgical reconstruction that abides the conservational principles of plastic surgery, as in the corrections of cancerous lesions.
3. Congenital deformities. The unique plastic properties of the bone, cartilage, and skin of patients' affected by congenital defects, and associated anomalies, are considered separately.

=== Surgical techniques ===
The effectiveness of a rhinoplastic reconstruction of the external nose derives from the contents of the surgeon's armamentarium of skin-flap techniques applicable to correcting defects of the nasal skin and of the mucosal lining; some management techniques are the bilobed flap, the nasolabial flap, the paramedian forehead flap, and the septal mucosal flap.

I. Bilobed flap

The design of the bilobed flap derives from the creation of two adjacent random transposition flaps (lobes). In its original design, the leading flap is applied to cover the defect, and the second flap, is emplaced where the skin flexes more, and fills the donor-site wound (from where the first flap was harvested), which then is closed primarily, with sutures. The first flap is oriented geometrically, at 90 degrees from the long axis of the wound (defect), and the second flap is oriented 180 degrees from the axis of the wound. Although effective, the bilobed flap technique did create troublesome "dog ears" of excess flesh that required trimming and it also produced a broad skin-donor area that was difficult to confine to the nose. In 1989, J. A. Zitelli modified the bilobed flap technique by: (a) orienting the leading flap at 45 degrees from the long axis of the wound; and (b) orienting the second flap at 90 degrees from the axis of the wound. Said orientations and emplacements eliminated the excess-flesh "dog ears", and thus required a smaller area of donor skin; resultantly, the broad-based, bilobed flap is less prone to the "trap door" and the "pin cushion" deformities common to skin-flap transposition procedure.

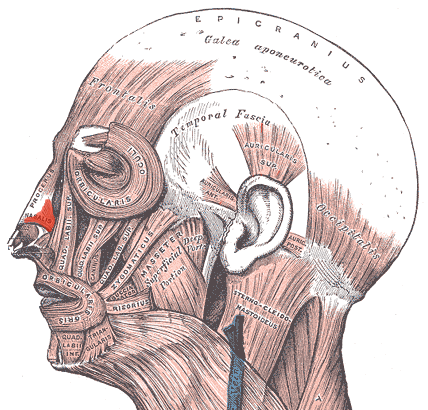
Rhinoplasty: The nasal muscle compresses the nasal bridge, depresses the tip of the nose, and flares (elevates) the corners of the nostrils.

Surgical technique – the bilobed flap

The design of the bilobed flap co-ordinates its lobes with the long axis of the nasal defect (wound); each lobe of the flap is emplaced at a 45-degree angle to the axis. The two lobes of the bilobed flap rotate along an arc, of which all points are equidistant from the apex of the nasal defect.

- Based upon the available area of nasal skin, the surgeon selects the locale for the bilobed flap, and orients the pedicle. If the defect is in the lateral aspect of the nose, the pedicle is based medially. If the defect is at the nasal tip, or at the nasal dorsum, the pedicle is based laterally. An ideal location for the second flap is along the junction of the nasal dorsum and the lateral nasal wall.
- The nasal wound is cut and shaped into a teardrop form, by the cutting out of a Burrow's triangle of flesh on the side of pedicle base. Cutting out the Burrow's triangle (skin and subcutaneous fat) permits the moving the pedicle flap, to emplace it without buckling the tissues adjacent to the graft.
- Using a 20 mm calliper as a protractor—one tip at the apex of the wound—the surgeon delineates two semi-circles, an inner semi-circle, and an outer semi-circle. The outer semi-circle defines the necessary length of the two lobes of the skin flap. The inner semi-circle bisects the center of the original wound, and continues across the donor skin, establishing limit measure of the pedicle common to the two lobes of the flap. The surgeon then draws two lines from the apex of the wound; the first line drawn is at an angle of 45 degrees from the long axis of the wound, and the second line drawn is at a 90-degree angle from the axis of the wound. The two lines delineate the central axes of the two lobes of the bilobed flap.
- The delineation of each of the two lobes of the flap begins and ends at the inner semi-circle, and extends to the outer semi-circle, to the point where it intersects its central axis. The width of the first lobe is approximately 2 mm narrower than the width of the wound; the width of the second lobe is approximately 2 mm narrower than the width of the first lobe.
- After the cutting from the tissue donor-site, the bilobed flap is elevated to a plane between the subcutaneous fat and the nasalis muscle. The wound is deepened, down to the nasal skeleton, to accommodate the tissue thickness of the bilobed flap. Technically, cutting the wound, enlarging it, is preferable, and safer, than trimming (thinning) the flap to fit the wound.
- Undermining the donor site for the second lobe allows closing it primarily; it also eliminates excess-skin "dog-ears" at the donor site. Moreover, if the donor site cannot be closed with sutures, or if the skin blanches (whitens) when sutured, usually because of excessively tight sutures, the tension is decreased by reducing the size (length, width, depth) of the wound with deep sutures that will allow it to heal more readily.

II. Nasolabial flap

In the 19th century, the surgical techniques of J.F. Dieffenbach (1792–1847) popularized the nasolabial flap for nasal reconstruction, for which it remains a foundational nose surgery procedure. The nasolabial flap can be either superiorly based or inferiorly based; of which the superiorly based flap is the more practical rhinoplastic application, because it has a more versatile arc of rotation, and the donor-site scar is inconspicuous. Depending upon how the defect lay upon the nose, the flap pedicle-base can be incorporated either solely to the nasal reconstruction, or it can be divided into a second stage procedure. The blood supply for the flap pedicle are the transverse branches of the contralateral angular artery (the facial artery terminus parallel to the nose), and by a confluence of blood vessels from the angular artery and from the supraorbital artery in the medial canthus, (the angles formed by the meeting of the upper and lower eyelids). Therefore, the incisions for harvesting the nasolabial flap do not continue superiorly beyond the medial canthal tendon. The nasolabial flap is a random flap that is emplaced with the proximal (near) portion resting upon the lateral wall of the nose, and the distal (far) portion resting upon the cheek, which contains the main angular artery, and so is perfused with retrograde arterial flow.

Surgical technique – the nasolabial flap

The pedicle of the nasolabial flap rests upon the lateral nasal wall, and is transposed a maximum of 60 degrees, in order to avoid the "bridge effect" of a flap emplaced across the nasofacial angle.

- The surgeon designs the nasolabial flap and sets its central axis at a 45-degree angle from the (long) axis of the nasal dorsum. The shape of the skin flap is cut from the wound template fabricated by the surgeon.
- An incision is made to the flap (without an anaesthetic injection of epinephrine), which then is elevated and oriented, in an inferior-to-superior direction, between the subcutaneous fat and the muscle fascia.
- The cutting continues until the skin flap can be freely transposed upon the nasal defect. A Burrow's triangle is excised from the skin between the medial border of the flap and the nasal dorsum; the triangle can be cut either before or after the elevation of the nasolabial.
- The flap then is bent back (reflected), and can be thinned (cut) under loupe magnification; however, a nasolabial flap cannot be thinned as easily as an axial skin-flap.
- After the nasolabial flap has been emplaced, the flap donor-site wound is sutured closed. For a wound of the lateral nasal wall that is less than 15 mm wide, the flap donor-site can be closed primarily, with sutures. For a wound wider than 15 mm—especially a wound that comprehends the alar lobule and the lateral wall of the nose—primary closure is not indicated, because such a wound closure imposes excessive stresses upon the skin flap, thereby risking either blanching (whitening) or distortion, or both. Such risks are avoided by advancing (moving) the skin of the cheek towards the nasofacial junction, where it is sutured to the deep tissues. Furthermore, a narrow wound, less than 1 mm wide can be allowed to heal by secondary intention (autonomous re-epithelialisation).

III. Paramedian forehead flap

The paramedian forehead flap is the premier autologous skin graft for the reconstruction of a nose, by replacing any of the aesthetic nasal subunits, especially regarding the problems of different tissue thickness and skin color. The forehead flap is an axial skin flap based upon the supraorbital artery (an ophthalmic artery branch) and the supratrochlear artery (an ophthalmic artery terminus), which can be thinned to the subdermal plexus in order to enhance the functional and aesthetic outcome of the nose. Restricted length is a practical application limit of the paramedian forehead flap, especially when the patient has a low frontal hairline. In such a patient, a small portion of scalp skin can be included to the flap, but it does have a different skin texture and does continue growing hair; such mismatching is avoided with the transverse emplacement of the flap along the hairline; yet that portion of the skin flap is random, and so risks a greater incidence of necrosis.

The paramedian forehead flap has two disadvantages, one operational and one aesthetic: Operationally, the reconstruction of a nose with a paramedian forehead flap is a two-stage surgical procedure, which might a problem for the patient whose health (surgical suitability) includes significant, secondary medical risks. Nonetheless, the second stage of the nasal reconstruction can be performed with the patient under local anaesthesia. Aesthetically, although the flap donor-site scar heals well, it is noticeable, and thus difficult to conceal, especially in men.

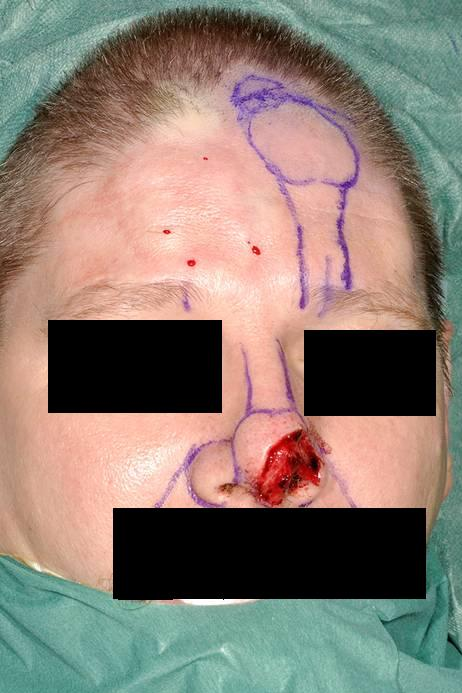
Rhinoplasty: A paramedian forehead flap design

Surgical technique – the paramedian forehead flap

The surgeon designs the paramedian forehead flap from a custom-fabricated three-dimensional metal foil template derived from the measures of the nasal defect to be corrected. Using an ultrasonic scanner, the flap-pedicle is centre-aligned upon the Doppler signal of the supraorbital artery. Afterwards, the distal one-half of the flap is dissected and thinned to the subdermal plexus.

- The surgeon fabricates a metal foil template derived from the dimensions of the nasal wound.
- Applying a Doppler ultrasonic scanner, the surgeon identifies the axial pedicle of the tissue-flap (composed of the supraorbital artery and the supratrochlear artery), usually at the base, next to the medial brow; the point usually is between the midline and the supraorbital notch.
- Tracing the Doppler pulse of the blood flow of the supraorbital artery as far as possible, its delineation is continued as a vertical line, until it intersects with the hairline of the patient. The line extended from the pulse of the blood flow is the central axis of the forehead flap.
- The length of the flap is determined by placing an un-folded, un-stretched 4 × 4-inch gauze upon the wound, and with it measuring from the pedicle base to the distal (furthest) point of the wound. This measure is the length of the central axis of the skin flap.
- The template is rotated 180 degrees and placed over the distal (far) portion of the axis of the skin flap; the surgeon outlines it with a surgical marker. The outline markings are continued proximally and parallel to the central axis, maintaining a 2-cm width for the proximal flap.
- Without applying an injection of anaesthetic epinephrine, the flap is incised (cut), and the distal one-half is elevated between the frontalis muscle and the subcutaneous fat.
- At approximately the mid-portion of the forehead, the surgeon deepens the plane of the dissection down to the submuscular plane. The dissection continues toward the brow and the glabella (the smooth prominence between the eyebrows) until the skin flap is sufficiently mobile to allow its relaxed transposition upon the nose.
- Under loupe magnification, the distal portion of the forehead flap is de-fatted, down to the subdermal plexus. Yet, the fat-removal should be conservative, especially if the patient is either a tobacco smoker or a diabetic, or both, because such health factors negatively affect blood circulation and tissue perfusion, and thus the timely and correct healing of the surgical scars to the nose.
- The flap is allowed to perfuse, while the donor site is sutured closed by means of the wide undermining deep to the frontalis muscle. At that time, diluted epinephrine can be injected to the forehead skin, but not to the area(s) near the pedicle of the forehead flap. Moreover, if the distal wound is wider than 25 mm, it usually is not closed by primary intention, with sutures, but is allowed to heal by secondary intention, by re-epithelialisation.
- The forehead flap is attached to the nasal wound with subcutaneous sutures and skin sutures. If the excess tension of a suture compromises the color of the skin flap, the suture can be loosened, with a skin hook, and observed for 10–15 minutes; if the skin color remains compromised (white), the suture is removed.
- Upon the complete attachment of the paramedian forehead flap to the nose, the surgical wounds are dressed only with antibiotic ointment.

IV. Septal mucosal flap

The septal mucosal tissue flap is the indicated technique for correcting defects of the distal half of the nose, and for correcting almost every type of large defect of the mucosal lining of the nose. The septal mucosal tissue flap, which is an anteriorly based pedicle-graft supplied with blood by the septal branch of the superior labial artery. To perform such a nasal correction, the entire septal mucoperichondrium can be harvested.

Surgical technique – the septal mucosal flap

The surgeon cuts the anteriorly based septal mucosal tissue-flap as widely as possible, and then releases it with a low, posterior back-cut; but only as required to allow the rotation of the tissue-flap into the nasal wound.

- The surgeon measures the dimensions (length, width, depth) of the nasal wound, and then delineates them upon the nasal septum, and, if possible, incorporates an additional margin of 3–5 mm of width to the wound measurements; furthermore, the base of the mucosal tissue flap should be at least 1.5-cm wide.
- The surgeon then makes two parallel incisions along the floor and the roof of the nasal septum; the incisions converge anteriorly, towards the front of the nasal spine.
- Using an elevator, the flap is dissected in a sub-mucoperichondrial plane. The (far) distal edge of the flap is cut with a right-angle Beaver blade, and then is transposed into the wound. The exposed cartilages will reepithelialise (regenerate the epithelium), provided the opposite (contralateral) side of the septal mucosa is undisturbed.

A technical variant of the septal mucosal flap technique is the trap-door flap, which is used to reconstruct one side of the upper half of the nasal lining. It is emplaced in the contralateral nasal cavity, as a superiorly based septal mucosal flap of rectangular shape, like that of a "trap-door". This septomucosal flap variant is a random flap with its pedicle based at the junction of the septum and the lateral nasal skeleton. The surgeon elevates the flap of septal mucosa to the roof of the nasal septum, and then traverses it into the contralateral (opposite) nasal cavity through a slit made by removing a small, narrow portion of the dorsal roof of the septum. Afterwards, the septomucosal flap is stretched across the wound in the mucosal lining of the lateral nose.

=== Surgical management ===
The following rhinoplastic techniques are applied to the surgical management of: (i) partial-thickness defects; (ii) full-thickness defects; (iii) heminasal reconstruction; and (iv) total nasal reconstruction.

I. Partial-thickness defects

A partial-thickness defect is a wound with adequate soft-tissue coverage of the underlying nasal skeleton, yet is too large for primary intention closure, with sutures. Based upon the locale of the wound, the surgeon has two options for correcting such a wound: (i) healing the wound by secondary intention (re-epithelialisation); and (ii) healing the wound with a full-thickness skin graft. Moreover, because it avoids the patched appearance of a skin-graft surgical correction, healing by secondary intention can successfully repair nasal wounds up to 10 mm in diameter; and, if the resultant scar proves aesthetically unacceptable, it can be revised later, after the wound has healed.

In the event, larger nasal wounds (defects) do successfully heal by secondary intention, but do present two disadvantages. First, the resultant scar often is a wide patch of tissue that is aesthetically inferior to the scars produced with other nasal-defect correction techniques; however, the skin of the medial canthus is an exception to such scarring. The second disadvantage to healing by secondary intention is that the contracture of the wound might distort the normal nasal anatomy, which can lead to a pronounced deformity of the alar rim area. For this reason, healing by secondary intention generally is not recommended for defects of the distal third of the nose; nonetheless, the exception is a small wound directly upon the nasal tip.

Full-thickness skin grafts are the effective wound-management technique for defects with a well-vascularized, soft-tissue bed covering the nasal skeleton. The patient's ear is the preferred skin-graft donor site from which to harvests grafts of pre-auricular skin and grafts of post-auricular skin, usually with an additional, small amount of adipose tissue to fill the wound cavity. Yet, nasal correction with a skin graft harvested from the patient's neck is not recommended, because that skin is low-density pilosebaceous tissue with very few follicles and sebaceous glands, thus is unlike the oily skin of the nose.

The technical advantages of nasal-defect correction with a skin graft are a brief surgery time, a simple rhinoplastic technique, and a low incidence of tissue morbidity. The most effective corrections are with a shallow wound with sufficient, supporting soft-tissue that will prevent the occurrence of a conspicuous depression. Nonetheless, two disadvantages of skin-graft correction are mismatched skin color and skin texture, which might result in a correction with a patch-work appearance; a third disadvantage is the natural histologic tendency for such skin grafts to contract, which might distort the shape of the corrected nose.

II. Full-thickness defects

Full-thickness nasal defects are in three types: (i) wounds to the skin and to the soft tissues, featuring either exposed bone or exposed cartilage, or both; (ii) wounds extending through the nasal skeleton; and (iii) wounds traversing all three nasal layers: skin, muscle, and the osseo-cartilaginous framework. Based upon the dimensions (length, width, depth) and topographic locale of the wound and the number of missing nasal-tissue layers, the surgeon determines the rhinoplastic technique for correcting a full-thickness defect; each of the aesthetic nasal subunits is considered separately and in combination.

(a) Medial canthus

The skin between the nasal dorsum and the medial canthal tendon is uniquely suited to healing by secondary intention; the outcomes often are superior to what is achieved with either skin grafts or skin-flaps and tissue-flaps. Because the medial canthal tendon is affixed to the facial bone, it readily resists the forces of wound contracture; moreover, the animation (movement) of the medial brow also lends resistance to the forces of wound contracture. Furthermore, the medial canthal region is aesthetically hidden by the shadows of the nasal dorsum and of the supraorbital rim, thereby obscuring any differences in the quality of the color and of the texture of the replacement skin (epithelium).

Healing by secondary intention (re-epithelialisation) occurs even when the wound extends to the nasal bone. Although the rate of healing depends upon the patient's wound-healing capacity, nasal wounds measuring up to 10 mm in diameter usually heal in at 4-weeks post-operative. Nonetheless, one potential, but rare, complication of this nasal correction approach is the formation of a medial canthal web, which can be corrected with two opposing Z-plasties, technique which relieves the disfiguring tensions exerted by the scar tissue's contracture, its shape, and location on the nose.

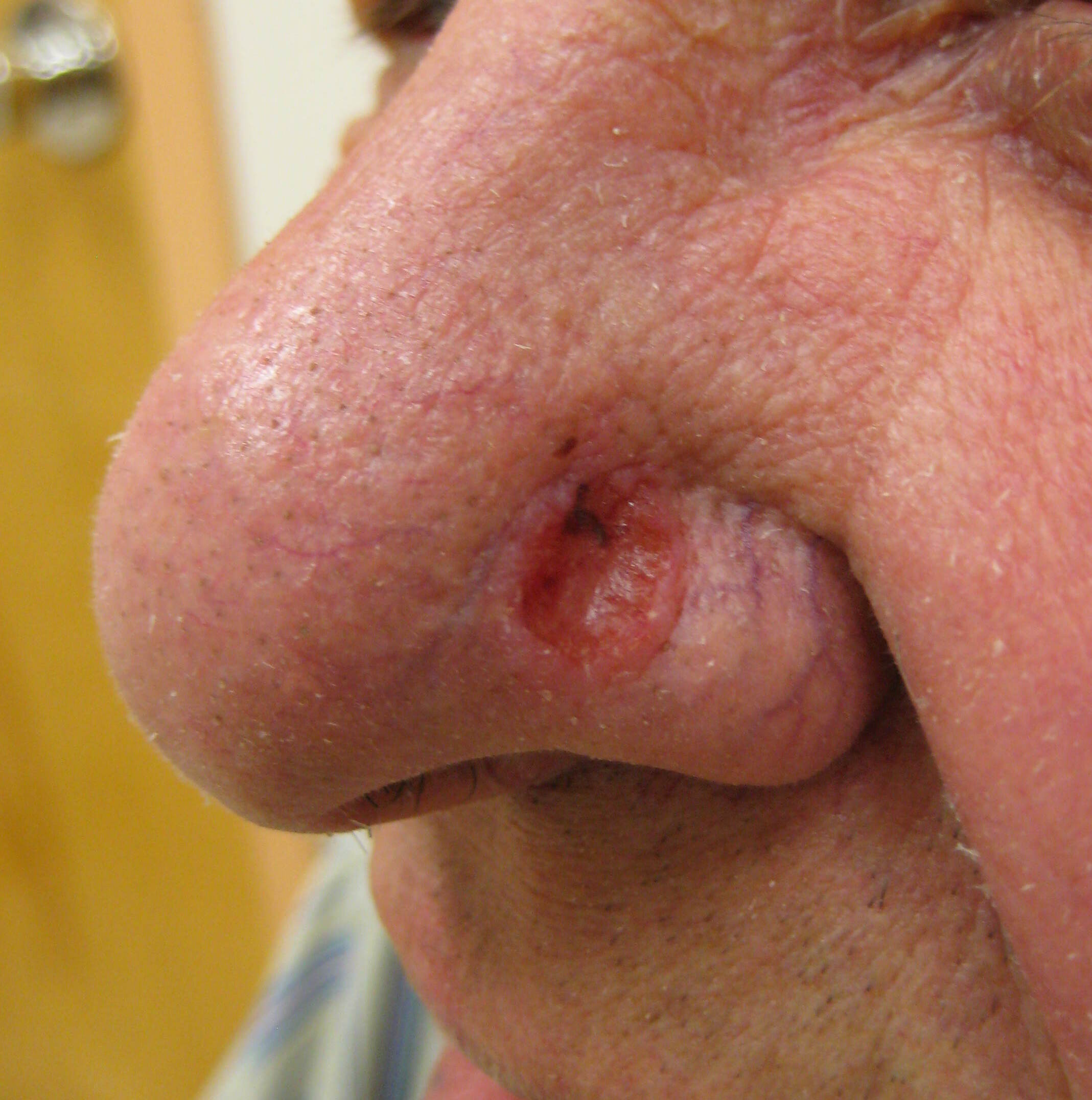
Rhinoplasty: A basal-cell carcinoma lesion on the juncture of the left alar base subunit and the left dorsal sidewall subunit, i.e. on the left nostril.

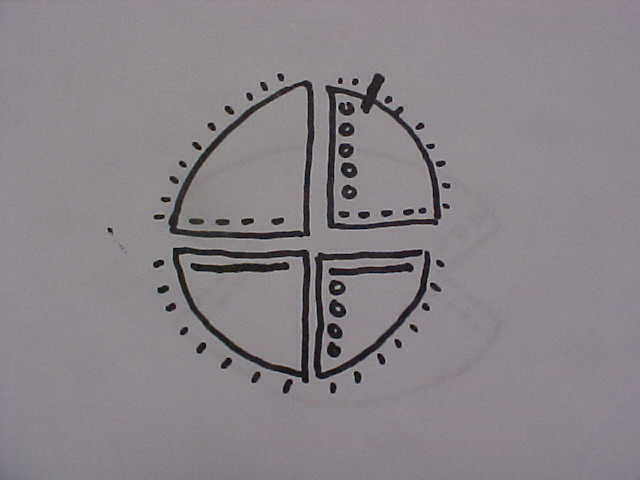
Rhinoplasty: A divided section design used in Mohs surgery for excising cancerous lesions before nasal reconstruction.

(b) Nasal dorsum and lateral nasal wall defect

The size of the nasal defect (wound) occurred, in either the dorsum or the lateral wall, or both, determines the reconstructive skin-flap technique applicable to the corresponding aesthetic nasal subunits.

- A wound of less than 10 mm in diameter can be managed either by primary intention healing (suturing) or by secondary intention healing (re-epithelialisation).
- A wound measuring 10–15 mm in diameter can be reconstructed with a single-stage modified bilobed flap, because it best matches the skin color and the skin texture of the wounded aesthetic subunit. Although not every scar can be hidden at the margins of the aesthetic nasal subunits concerned, the superior scarring ability of those nasal skin areas minimizes such an histologic disadvantage. In a patient whose basal-cell carcinoma was excised with Mohs surgery, the scar of the nasal reconstruction (an 11 mm full-thickness, laterally based, bilobed-flap applied down to the bone and the cartilage), was hidden by aligning the axis of the second lobe to and emplacing the skin graft at the junction of the nasal dorsum and the lateral wall of the nose.
- A wound greater than 15 mm in diameter can be corrected with a paramedian forehead flap, which will reconstruct either the entire nasal dorsum or the lateral wall of the nose, as required. The surgical management of such wounds (< 15 mm dia.) usually requires enlarging the wound as necessary, in order for the skin graft to comprehend the entire aesthetic subunit being corrected. Moreover, if the wound comprehends the dorsum and the lateral wall of the nose, then a cheek-advancement skin flap is the applicable correction for replacing the lateral nasal skin up to its junction with the dorsum; afterwards, a paramedian forehead flap is applied to resurface the nasal dorsum.
- A wound in the lateral nasal wall that is greater than 15 mm in diameter can also be corrected with a superiorly based, nasolabial-flap, which is especially suited for correcting distal defects that lay among the convexities of the nasal tip and the alar lobule. The nasolabial flap can correct defects that comprehend the distal two-thirds of the nose, if there is a supply of skin sufficient for constructing the base of the flap pedicle; and the donor sites cannot be closed primarily. Yet, bulkiness is the principal disadvantage of the nasolabial flap—except in elderly patients with atrophic cheek skin; nonetheless, it is technically effective for patients unsuitable for a two-stage rhinoplasty with a paramedian forehead flap.
- Nasal defects involving either the bone or the cartilage of the lateral nose are best managed with free grafts of flat septal bone and of cartilage. Small defects of the nasal dorsum can be covered with cartilage grafts harvested from either the septum or the concha of the ear. The correction of large-area defects of the nasal dorsum requires the stable support of a bone graft affixed either with a lag screw or with a low-profile plate. A costal graft (from the rib cage) is ideal for such a repair, because it can be harvested with an attached extension of cartilage that can be sculpted to blend into the nasal tip; other potential donor sites for nasal dorsum reconstruction materials are the outer table of the skull, the iliac crest, and the inner table of the ilium proper.
- To correct a defect of the nasal lining of the upper two-thirds of the nose, the wound dimensions (length, width, depth) determine the technique. A nasal-lining defect of less than 5 mm in diameter can be closed primarily, with sutures. A nasal-lining defect 5–15 mm in diameter can be closed with a random transposition flap harvested from a nasal area that remains protected, either by the nasal bones or by the upper lateral cartilages; and the flap donor-site can be healed by secondary intention, re-epithelialisation. For a mucosa defect greater than 15 mm in diameter, the indicated correction is a superiorly based "trap door" septal mucosal flap, grafted to the roof of the nasal septum.

(c) Nasal tip defect

The width of the human nasal-tip ranges 20–30 mm; the average width of the nasal tip, measured between the two alar lobules, is approximately 25 mm.

- A nasal skin defect of less than 15 mm in diameter can be managed with a bilobed flap; the surgeon trims the edges of the wound (defect) to match its dimensions (length, width, depth) to the natural curve at the border of the nasal tip. If the wound is eccentric, the skin-flap is positioned so that the lateral base of the graft occupies the largest portion of the wound's surface.
- If the nasal-tip wound is greater than 15 mm in diameter, the surgeon enlarges it to comprehend the entire aesthetic subunit affected by the defect, and the reconstruction of the nasal subunit done with a forehead flap. If the nasal-tip defect also involves the nasal dorsum, a forehead flap is indicated for reconstructing the entire nasal-tip and dorsum.
- If an alar cartilage is missing, either partially or entirely, it is reconstructed with cartilage grafts. The defect of an alar dome, which retains adequate anatomic support-tripod configuration, can be corrected with an onlay graft harvested either from the nasal septum or from the conchal cartilage of an ear. The surgeon forms the cartilage graft into the shape of a shield—its widest margins become the replacement alar domes. Typically, the shield cartilage graft is stacked in two layers, in order to transmit the desired light reflex characteristic of the nasal tip.
- Defects of the lateral crura can be corrected with a flat strut of formed cartilage, but, if the support of the medial crura is absent, then a columella strut must be inserted, and attached at the level of the anterior nasal spine. If a strut of nasal-septum cartilage proves too weak, then a rib cartilage strut can be applied to provide the adequate nasal support; afterwards, the strut is covered with onlay grafts.
- Absent alar cartilages can be replaced using all of the conchal cartilage from both ears; two strips, each 10 mm wide, are harvested from the antihelical fold, and then are applied as replacement alar wings. The surgeon attaches them to the anterior nasal spine, and to each side of the (pear-shaped) pyriform aperture; the remainder of the harvested conchal cartilage is applied as onlay grafts to augment the nasal tip.
- A nasal-tip lining defect is unusual, because of its midline location; yet, the reconstruction is with an anteriorly based septal mucosal flap that is rotated into place to provide adequate coverage and correction of the nasal lining defect.
- Vertical lobule division (VLD) is a common technique for nasal tip refinement, which involves the medial crural angle and the lateral crural angle.

(d) Alar lobule defect

The appropriate surgical management of an alar lobule defect depends upon the dimensions (length, width, depth) of the wound. Anatomically, the nasal skin and the underlying soft tissues of the alar lobule form a semi-rigid aesthetic subunit that forms the graceful curve of the alar rim, and provides unobstructed airflow through the nostrils, the anterior nares.

- When most of the alar lobule tissue is missing, the nose collapses; the correction is with an ear concha cartilage-graft harvested from the antihelix, a donor site where the cartilage is most rigidly curved, thus is ideal for replacing an alar lobule.
- Nasal skin defects can be corrected with a medially based bilobed flap, which is emplaced to provide adequate skin coverage for wounds limited to the alar lobule. If the entire lobule is missing, it might be necessary to leave the second-lobe donor-site wound partially open; it will close at 2–4 weeks post-operative; afterwards, the scar can be revised. Nonetheless, the alternative surgical correction is a two-stage, superiorly based, nasolabial flap.
- If the alar lobule defect also comprehends the lateral wall of the nose, the defect can be closed either with a superiorly based nasolabial-flap or with a forehead flap. If the cheek skin is thin and atrophic, a nasolabial flap is the recommended reconstruction; otherwise, a forehead flap is recommended, because the thickness of forehead skin is a superior match for nasal skin and tissue. Mucosal lining defects of the alar lobule can be resurfaced with a bipedicled mucosal advancement-flap harvested from inside the lateral wall of the nose. Likewise, larger defects of the mucosa do require correction with an anteriorly based septal mucosal flap.

III. Heminasal and total nasal reconstruction

The reconstruction rhinoplasty of an extensive heminasal defect or of a total nasal defect is an extension of the plastic surgical principles applied to resolving the loss of a regional aesthetic subunit. The skin layers are replaced with a paramedian forehead flap, but, if forehead skin is unavailable, the alternative corrections include the Washio retroauricular-temporal flap and the Tagliacozzi flap. The nasal skeleton is replaced with a rib-graft nasal dorsum and lateral nasal wall; septal cartilage grafts and conchal cartilage grafts are applied to correct defects of the nasal tip and of the alar lobules.

The nasal lining of the distal two-thirds of the nose can be covered with anteriorly based septal mucosal flaps; however, if bilateral septal-flaps are used, the septal cartilage does become devascularized, possibly from iatrogenic septal perforation. Furthermore, if the nasal defect is beyond the wound-correction scope of a septal mucosal flap, the alternative techniques are either an inferiorly based pericranial-flap (harvested from the frontal bone) or a free flap of temporoparietal fascia (harvested from the head), either of which can be lined with free grafts of mucosa to achieve the nasal reconstruction.

=== Corrections of defect and deformity ===
- Cancer – The excision of cancerous nasal skin can cause the loss of skin and internal support cartilage; such resections (surgical removal) usually are via the Mohs' chemosurgical technique. After removing the cancerous tissues, the reconstructive rhinoplasty will provide skin coverage using either skin grafts or pedicle flaps, (see Nasal Reconstruction, Paramedian Forehead Flap). If the resection of the cancerous skin leads to losing the nose tip, cartilage grafts can be used for support, and to prevent long-term distortion consequent to the force of the contracture of scar tissue.

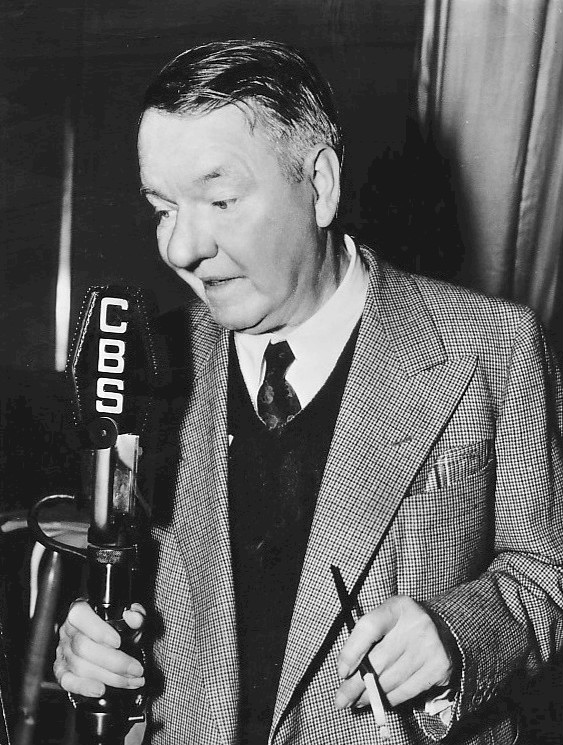
Revision rhinoplasty: The American actor W.C. Fields was affected by rhinophyma.

- Congenital deformity – The correction of vascular malformations and cleft lip and palate abnormalities. In vascular malformations, the progression of the disease distorts the skin and the underlying structure of the nose. Cleft lip and cleft palate defects usually distort the size, position, and orientation of the nasal-tip cartilages. Reconstruction of vascular malformations can involve laser treatment of the skin, and surgical excision of the deformed tissues. When the underlying cartilage support structure is disturbed, cartilage grafts and suturing of the native nasal cartilages can help improve nasal aesthetics by re-orienting the nasal tip cartilages; and cartilage-graft refinements to the nose tip are performed as required.
- Obstructed airways – The restoration of normal breathing by correcting nasal obstruction caused by a cosmetic rhinoplasty wherein nasal cartilages were over-aggressively trimmed, and the nose appears pinched, which compromises nasal potency (airflow), especially when the patient attempts deep inspiration. These grafting techniques restore normal breathing by increasing the size of the nose tip with baton grafts (internal cartilage), and spreader grafts to widen the nasal middle vault. Furthermore, to improve breathing a septoplasty can be performed concurrent to the reconstructive surgery; likewise, if there is turbinate hypertrophy, an inferior turbinectomy can be performed.
- Perforated septum – The reconstruction of a saddle nose caused by a (collapsed) perforated septum, or by autoimmune problems such as granulomatosis with polyangiitis (GPA), sarcoidosis, eosinophilic granulomatosis with polyangiitis (EGPA), relapsing polychondritis, by intranasal drug use, and by excessive nasal aerosol use. The saddle nose deformity resulting from lost dorsum support is reconstructed using autologous bone grafts and rib cartilage grafts.
- Rhinophyma – The correction of late-stage Rosacea, wherein the nasal skin is infected with acne rosacea that reddens, thickens, and enlarges the nose tip; an exemplar case is the American actor W.C. Fields. Although antibiotic acne treatments (e.g. Acutane) can halt the progression of Rosacea, the thickened skin and the fleshy obscuring of the nasal tip can only be corrected with rhinoplasty. Laser excision of abnormally thickened skin is the best rhinoplastic treatment for Rhinophyma; the CO_{2} laser and the infrared Erbium: YAG laser are the most effective treatments.

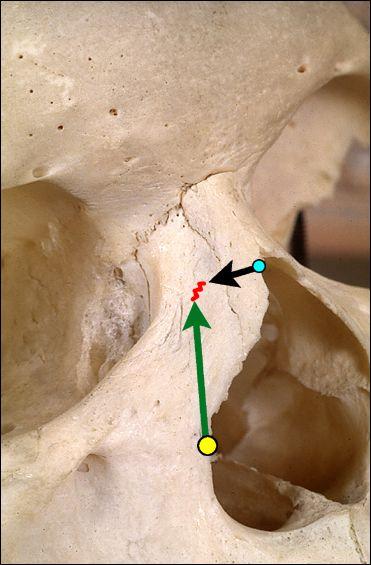
Illustration 2: Nose-narrowing rhinoplasty; two chisel cuts (green and black arrows) meet at the red zig-zag line to release the bone for corrective re-alignment.

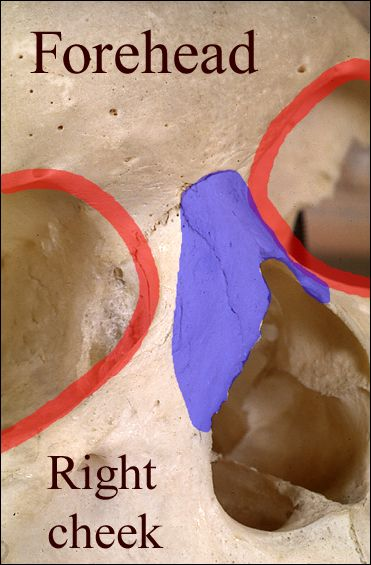
Illustration 1: The nasal bones (violet) of the dorsum identified, for effecting a nose-narrowing rhinoplasty.

- Wide nose – To narrow a too-wide nose, the plastic surgeon cuts, contours, and rearranges the craniofacial bones to achieve the desired functional and aesthetic outcome of a narrower, straighter nose. To leave no visible, surgical scars upon the new nose, the surgeon effects the osteotome (bone chisel) incisions to the nasal bones beneath the facial skin.

Illustration 1: The surgeon cuts the excessively wide bones of the upper nasal dorsum (violet) with an osteotome (bone chisel), then detaches, corrects, and relocates them inwards, to a position, between the ocular orbits (red), that narrows the width of the nasal dorsum.

Illustration 2: The surgeon chisels two cuts (incisions) to the nasal bones, each incision begins at the nasal cavity. The first incision begins at the yellow dot and extends upwards, along the green arrow, until meeting the zig-zag line (red). The second incision begins at the blue dot and extends upwards, along the black arrow, until meeting the zig-zag line (red). Once cut and loosened from the face, the nasal bone pieces are corrected, then pushed inwards and re-set, thus narrowing the nose.

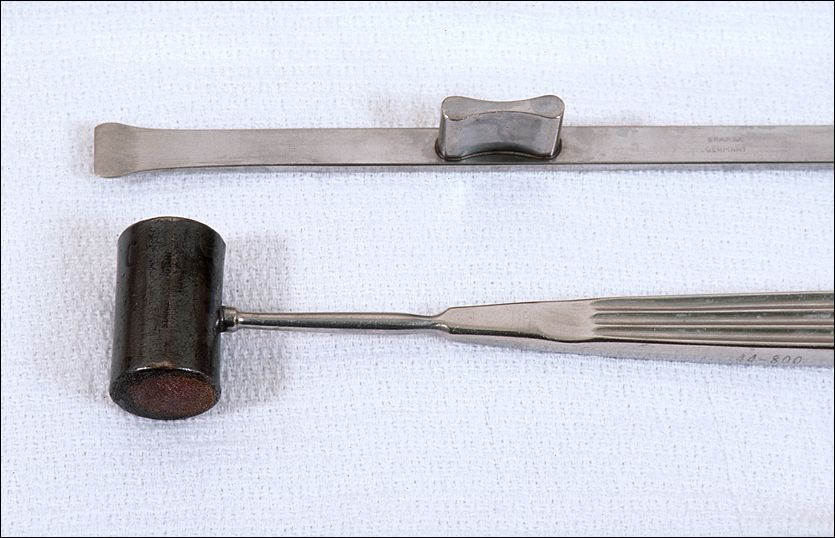
Rhinoplastic instruments:
An osteotome (bone chisel) and a surgical hammer for sculpting craniofacial bones.

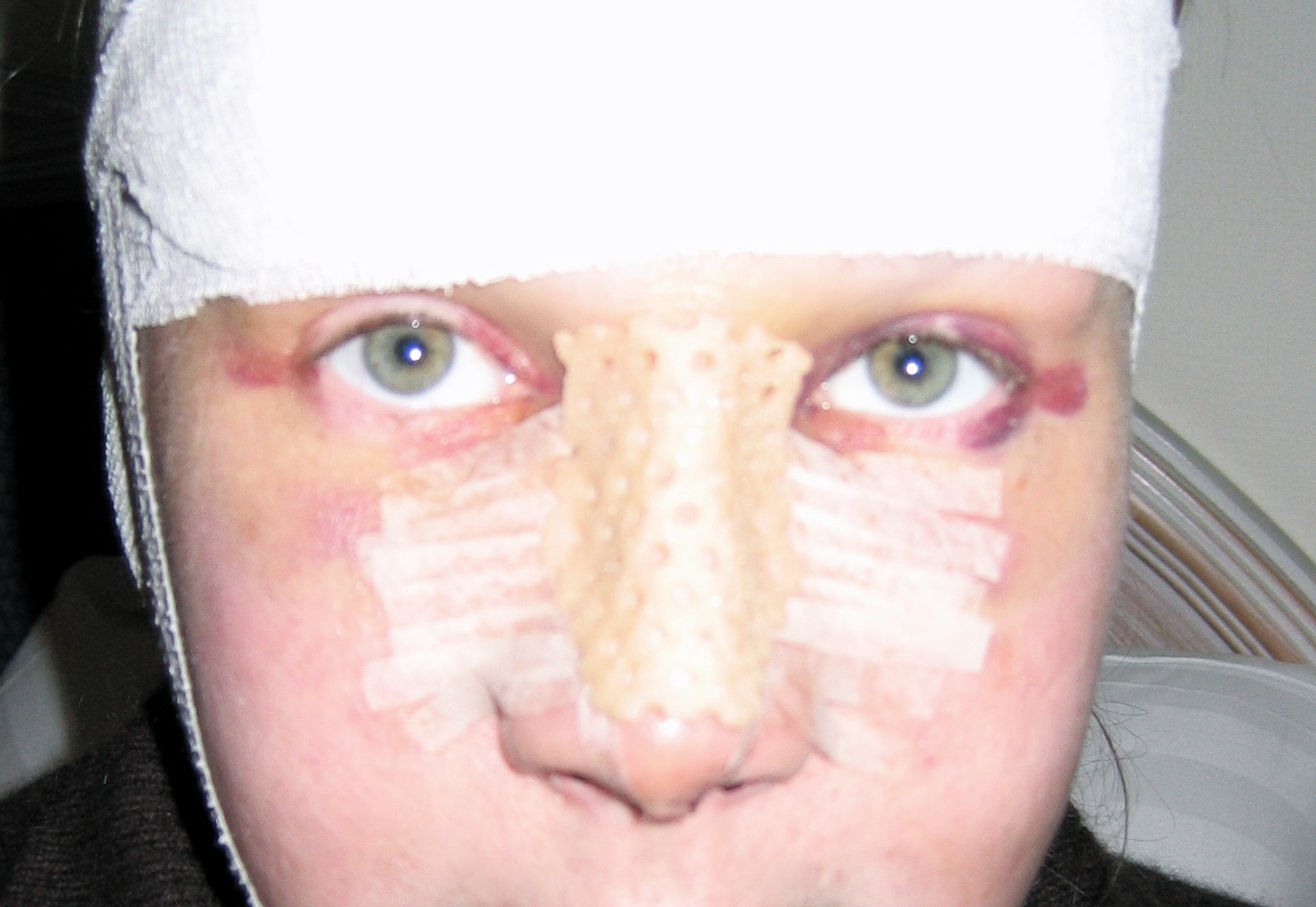
Rhinoplasty: At 3-days post-operative, the patient wearing their nasal splint after a dorsal bone reduction, re-setting, and nasal-tip refinement. The panda eyes (orbital discoloration) is consequent to trauma and ocular blood vessel disruption.

=== Post–surgical recovery ===
Convalescence

The rhinoplasty patient returns home after surgery, to rest, and allow the nasal cartilage and bone tissues to heal the effects of having been forcefully cut. Assisted with prescribed medications—antibiotics, analgesics, steroids—to alleviate pain and aid wound healing, the patient convalesces for about 1-week, and can go outdoors. Post-operatively, external sutures are removed at 4–5 days; the external cast is removed at 1-week; the stents are removed within 4–14 days; and the "panda eyes" periorbital bruising heal at 2-weeks. If an alar base reduction is performed conjunctively within the Rhinoplasty, these sutures need to be removed within 7–10 days post operatively. Throughout the first year post-operative, in the course of the rhinoplastic wounds healing, the tissues will shift moderately as they settle into being a new nose. Furthermore, as rhinoplasty climbs the ladder of surgical procedures performed to achieve an aspired appearance, especially amongst women, the relationship between body image and mental state must be examined in order to destigmatize motives behind the surgical intervention.

=== Risks ===
Rhinoplasty is safe, yet complications can arise. Postoperative deformities remain a primary risk with clinical data indicating revision surgery is required in 5% to 15% of cases.

==== Pollybeak ====
The "pollybeak" deformity, characterized by excessive supratip fullness usually involving a cartilaginous hump or loss of tip projection, is the indication for approximately 50% of all revision rhinoplasties. If too much of the osseo-cartilaginous framework is removed, the consequent weakening can cause the external nasal skin to become shapeless, resulting in a "pollybeak" deformity, resembling the beak of a parrot.

==== Saddle Nose ====
When performing a septoplasty as part of a rhinoplasty, it is recommended to leave an L-strut of at least 1cm. The L-strut is a dorsal and caudal portion of the septum that is preserved. If the septum is unsupported, the bridge of the nose can sink, resulting in a "saddle nose" deformity, usually caused by over-resection of the septal L-strut. This may necessitate structural reconstruction with autologous cartilage or bone grafts.

==== Inverted-V ====
When operating on the midvault of the nose, it is important to reattach the upper lateral cartilages to the nasal septum. Failure to do so may cause the upper lateral cartilages to collapse inward and caudaully, creating an upside-down "V" shadow. Inverted-V deformities are typically corrected with spreader grafts to restore the internal nasal valve.

==== Rocker Deformity ====
When operating on the upper vault of the nose, osteotomies may be performed to mobilize the nasal bones. These osteotomies should ideally have their superior limit at the nasofrontal suture, which is approximated by the medial canthus. If the osteotomy is carried too far superiorly into the frontal bone, a Rocker deformity may result, wherein the upper portion of the mobile bone flares outwards (or "rocks") when the inferior portion is medialized. Correction of a Rocker deformity would involve a transverse percutaneous osteotomy.

==== Open Roof Deformity ====
Reduction of a dorsal hump may involve bone (upper vault) and/or cartilage (middle vault). When the bony dorsum (eg, nasal bone) is reduced, there may be a resulting gap in the middle of the nasal bones. This is typically corrected intraoperatively with lateral osteotomies to narrow the nasal bones and remove the gap. However, if the gap is not corrected, then an open roof deformity may result.

==== Other Deformities ====
The tip of the nose can be over-rotated, causing the nostrils to be too visible, resulting in a porcine nose. If the cartilages of the nose tip are over-resected, it can cause a pinched-tip nose. If the columella is incorrectly cut, variable-degree numbness might result, which requires a months-long resolution. If an overly aggressive cephalic trim is performed, the nasal tip may develop bossae.

==== Other Risks ====
Post-operative bleeding is uncommon, but usually resolves without treatment. Infection is rare, but, when it does occur, it might progress to become an abscess requiring the surgical drainage of the pus, whilst the patient is under general anaesthesia. Adhesions, scars that obstruct the airways, can form a bridge across the nasal cavity, from the septum to the turbinates, and lead to difficulty breathing and may require surgical removal. Furthermore, in the course of the rhinoplasty, the surgeon might accidentally perforate the septum (septal perforation), which later can cause chronic nose bleeding, crusting of nasal fluids, difficult breathing, and whistling breathing. A turbinectomy may result in empty nose syndrome.

== Non-surgical rhinoplasty ==
Non-surgical rhinoplasty is a medical procedure in which injectable fillers, such as collagen or hyaluronic acid, are used to alter and shape a person's nose without invasive surgery. The procedure fills in depressed areas on the nose, lifting the angle of the tip or smoothing the appearance of bumps on the bridge. The procedure does not alter nose size, though it can be used to correct some functional birth defects.

Originally developed at the turn of the twenty-first century, early attempts used biologically harmful soft-tissue fillers such as paraffin wax and silicone. After 2000, physicians use minimally invasive techniques using modern fillers.
