= Sensory nervous system =

Part of the nervous system

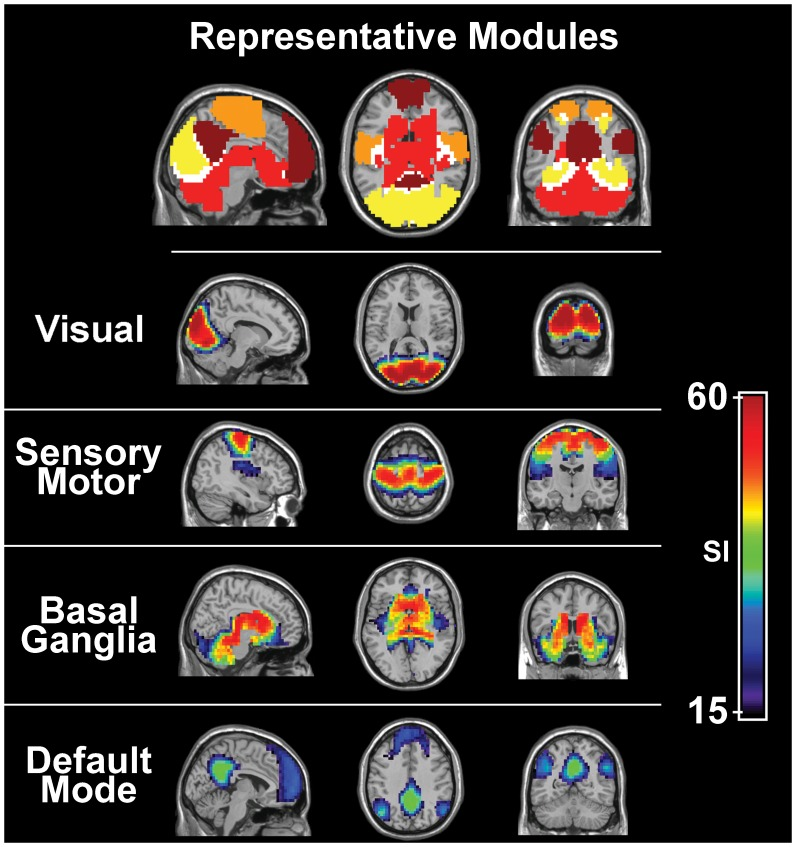
The visual system and the somatosensory system are active even during resting state fMRI.

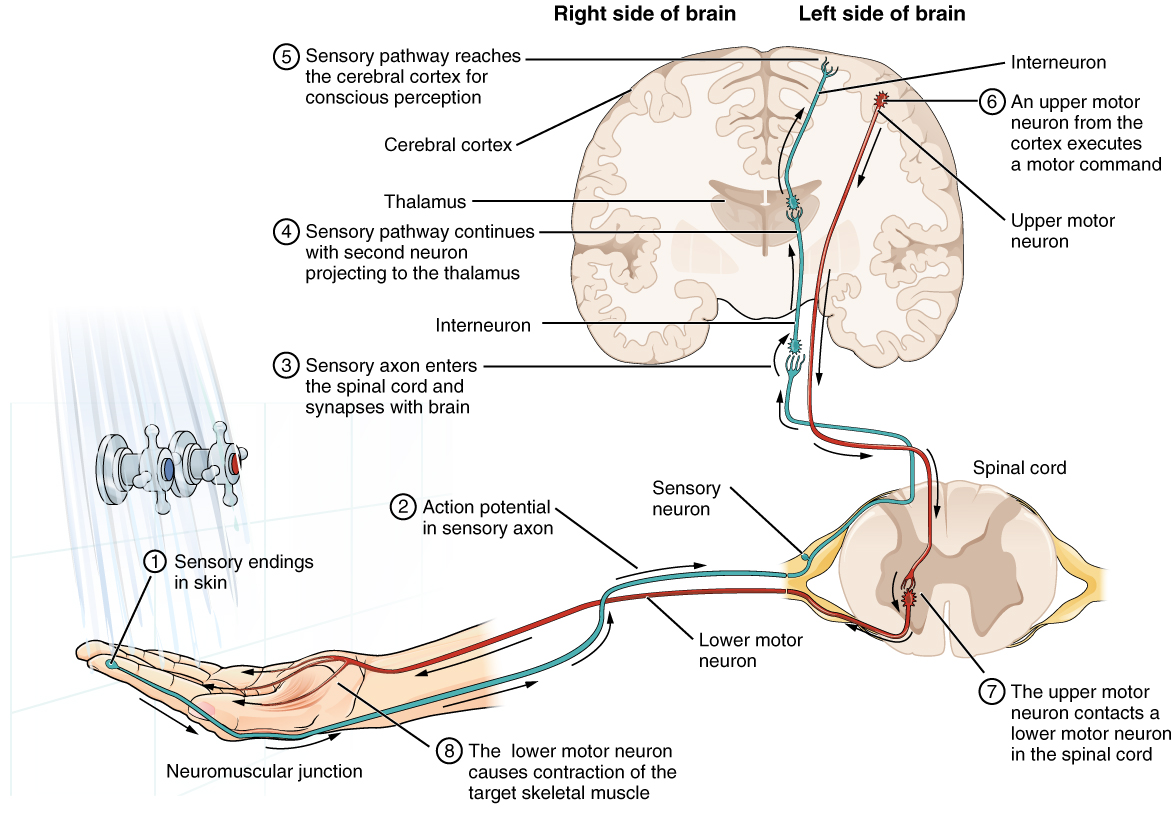
Activation and response in the sensory nervous system

The sensory nervous system is a part of the nervous system responsible for processing sensory information. A sensory system consists of sensory neurons (including the sensory receptor cells), neural pathways, and parts of the brain involved in sensory perception and interoception. Commonly recognized sensory systems are those for vision, hearing, touch, taste, smell, balance and visceral sensation. Sense organs are transducers that convert data from the outer physical world to the realm of the mind where people interpret the information, creating their perception of the world around them.

The receptive field is the area of the body or environment to which a receptor organ and receptor cells respond. For instance, the part of the world an eye can see, is its receptive field; the light that each rod or cone can see, is its receptive field. Receptive fields have been identified for the visual system, auditory system and somatosensory system.

== Senses and receptors ==
While debate exists among neurologists as to the specific number of senses due to differing definitions of what constitutes a sense, Gautama Buddha and Aristotle classified five 'traditional' human senses which have become universally accepted: touch, taste, smell, vision, and hearing. Other senses that have been well-accepted in most mammals, including humans, include pain, balance and temperature. Furthermore, some nonhuman animals have been shown to possess alternate senses, including magnetoreception and electroreception.

=== Receptors ===
The initialization of sensation stems from the response of a specific receptor to a physical stimulus. The receptors which react to the stimulus and initiate the process of sensation are commonly characterized in four distinct categories: chemoreceptors, photoreceptors, mechanoreceptors, and thermoreceptors. All receptors receive distinct physical stimuli and transduce the signal into an electrical action potential. This action potential then travels along afferent neurons to specific brain regions where it is processed and interpreted.

=== Chemoreceptors ===
Chemoreceptors, or chemosensors, detect certain chemical stimuli and transduce that signal into an electrical action potential. The two primary types of chemoreceptors are:

1. Distance chemoreceptors are integral to receiving stimuli in gases in the olfactory system through both olfactory receptor neurons and neurons in the vomeronasal organ.
2. Direct chemoreceptors that detect stimuli in liquids include the taste buds in the gustatory system as well as receptors in the aortic bodies which detect changes in oxygen concentration.

=== Photoreceptors ===
Photoreceptors are neuron cells and are specialized units that play the main role in initiating vision function. Photoreceptors are light-sensitive cells that capture different wavelengths of light. Different types of photoreceptors are able to respond to the varying light wavelengths in relation to color, and transduce them into electrical signals. Photoreceptors are capable of phototransduction, a process which converts light (electromagnetic radiation) into, among other types of energy, a membrane potential. There are five compartments that are present in these cells. Each compartment corresponds to differences in function and structure. The first compartment is the outer segment (OS), where it is responsible for capturing light and transducing it. The second compartment is the inner segment (IS), which includes the necessary organelles that function in cellular metabolism and biosynthesis. Mainly, these organelles include mitochondria, Golgi apparatus, and endoplasmic reticulum, among others. The third compartment is the connecting cilium (CC). As its name suggests, CC works to connect the OS and the IS regions together for the purpose of essential protein trafficking. The fourth compartment contains the nucleus and is a continuation of the IS region, known as the nuclear region. Finally, the fifth compartment is the synaptic region, where it acts as a final terminal for the signal, consisting of synaptic vesicles. In this region, glutamate neurotransmitter is transmitted from the cell to secondary neuron cells. The three primary types of photoreceptors are: cones are photoreceptors which respond significantly to color. In humans, the three different types of cones correspond with a primary response to short wavelength (blue), medium wavelength (green), and long wavelength (yellow/red). Rods are photoreceptors which are very sensitive to the intensity of light, allowing for vision in dim lighting. The concentrations and ratio of rods to cones is strongly correlated with whether an animal is diurnal or nocturnal. In humans, rods outnumber cones by approximately 20:1, while in nocturnal animals, such as the tawny owl, the ratio is closer to 1000:1. Ganglion cells reside in the adrenal medulla and retina where they are involved in the sympathetic response. Of the ~1.3 million ganglion cells present in the retina, 1–2% are believed to be photosensitive ganglia. These photosensitive ganglia play a role in conscious vision for some animals, and are believed to do the same in humans.

=== Mechanoreceptors ===
Mechanoreceptors are sensory receptors which respond to mechanical forces, such as pressure or distortion. While mechanoreceptors are present in hair cells and play an integral role in the vestibular and auditory systems, the majority of mechanoreceptors are cutaneous and are grouped into four categories:

1. Slowly adapting type 1 receptors have small receptive fields and respond to static stimulation. These receptors are primarily used in the sensations of form and roughness.
2. Slowly adapting type 2 receptors have large receptive fields and respond to stretch. Similarly to type 1, they produce sustained responses to a continued stimuli.
3. Rapidly adapting receptors have small receptive fields and underlie the perception of slip.
4. Pacinian receptors have large receptive fields and are the predominant receptors for high-frequency vibration.

=== Thermoreceptors ===
Thermoreceptors are sensory receptors which respond to varying temperatures. While the mechanisms through which these receptors operate is unclear, recent discoveries have shown that mammals have at least two distinct types of thermoreceptors:

1. The end-bulb of Krause or bulboid corpuscle detects temperatures above body temperature.
2. Ruffini's end organ detects temperatures below body temperature.

TRPV1 is a heat-activated channel that acts as a small heat detecting thermometer in the membrane which begins the polarization of the neural fiber when exposed to changes in temperature. Ultimately, this allows us to detect ambient temperature in the warm/hot range. Similarly, the molecular cousin to TRPV1, TRPM8, is a cold-activated ion channel that responds to cold. Both cold and hot receptors are segregated by distinct subpopulations of sensory nerve fibers, which shows us that the information coming into the spinal cord is originally separate. Each sensory receptor has its own "labeled line" to convey a simple sensation experienced by the recipient. Ultimately, TRP channels act as thermosensors, channels that help us to detect changes in ambient temperatures.

=== Nociceptors ===
Nociceptors respond to potentially damaging stimuli by sending signals to the spinal cord and brain. This process, called nociception, usually causes the perception of pain. They are found in internal organs, as well as on the surface of the body. Nociceptors detect different kinds of damaging stimuli or actual damage. Those that only respond when tissues are damaged are known as "sleeping" or "silent" nociceptors.

1. Thermal nociceptors are activated by noxious heat or cold at various temperatures.
2. Mechanical nociceptors respond to excess pressure or mechanical deformation.
3. Chemical nociceptors respond to a wide variety of chemicals, some of which are signs of tissue damage. They are involved in the detection of some spices in food.

== Sensory cortex ==
All stimuli received by the receptors listed above are transduced to an action potential, which is carried along one or more afferent neurons towards a specific area of the brain. While the term sensory cortex is often used informally to refer to the somatosensory cortex, the term more formally refers to the multiple areas of the brain at which senses are received to be processed. For the five traditional senses in humans, this includes the primary and secondary cortices of the different senses: the somatosensory cortex, the visual cortex, the auditory cortex, the primary olfactory cortex, and the gustatory cortex. Other modalities have corresponding sensory cortex areas as well, including the vestibular cortex for the sense of balance.

The human sensory system consists of the following subsystems:

- Visual system (Vision)
- Auditory system (Hearing)
- Somatosensory system (Touch/Temperature/Kinesthesia/Pain)
- Gustatory system (Taste)
- Olfactory system (Smell)
- Vestibular system (Balance)

=== Somatosensory cortex ===
Located in the parietal lobe, the primary somatosensory cortex is the primary receptive area for the sense of touch and proprioception in the somatosensory system. This cortex is further divided into Brodmann areas 1, 2, and 3. Brodmann area 3 is considered the primary processing center of the somatosensory cortex as it receives significantly more input from the thalamus, has neurons highly responsive to somatosensory stimuli, and can evoke somatic sensations through electrical stimulation. Areas 1 and 2 receive most of their input from area 3. There are also pathways for proprioception (via the cerebellum), and motor control (via Brodmann area 4). See also: S2 Secondary somatosensory cortex.

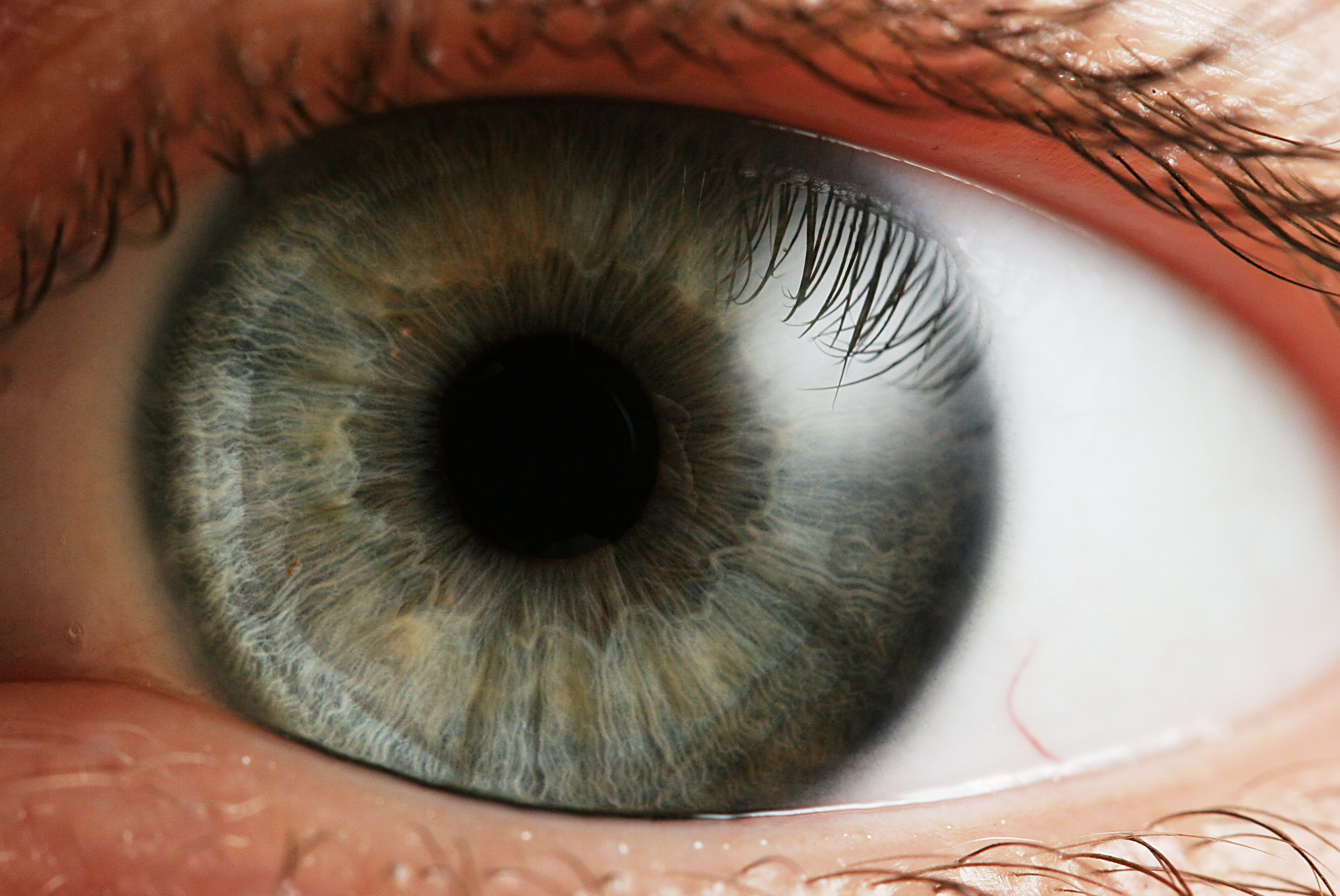
The human eye is the first element of a sensory system: in this case, vision, for the visual system.

=== Visual cortex ===
The visual cortex is the part of the cerebral cortex that processes visual information. Processing in the visual cortex starts in the primary visual cortex, labeled V1 or Brodmann area 17, as well as the extrastriate visual cortical areas V2-V5. Located in the occipital lobe, V1 acts as the primary relay station for visual input, transmitting information to two primary pathways labeled the dorsal and ventral streams. The dorsal stream includes areas V2 and V5, and is used in interpreting visual 'where' and 'how.' The ventral stream includes areas V2 and V4, and is used in interpreting 'what.' Increases in task-negative activity are observed in the ventral attention network, after abrupt changes in sensory stimuli, at the onset and offset of task blocks, and at the end of a completed trial.

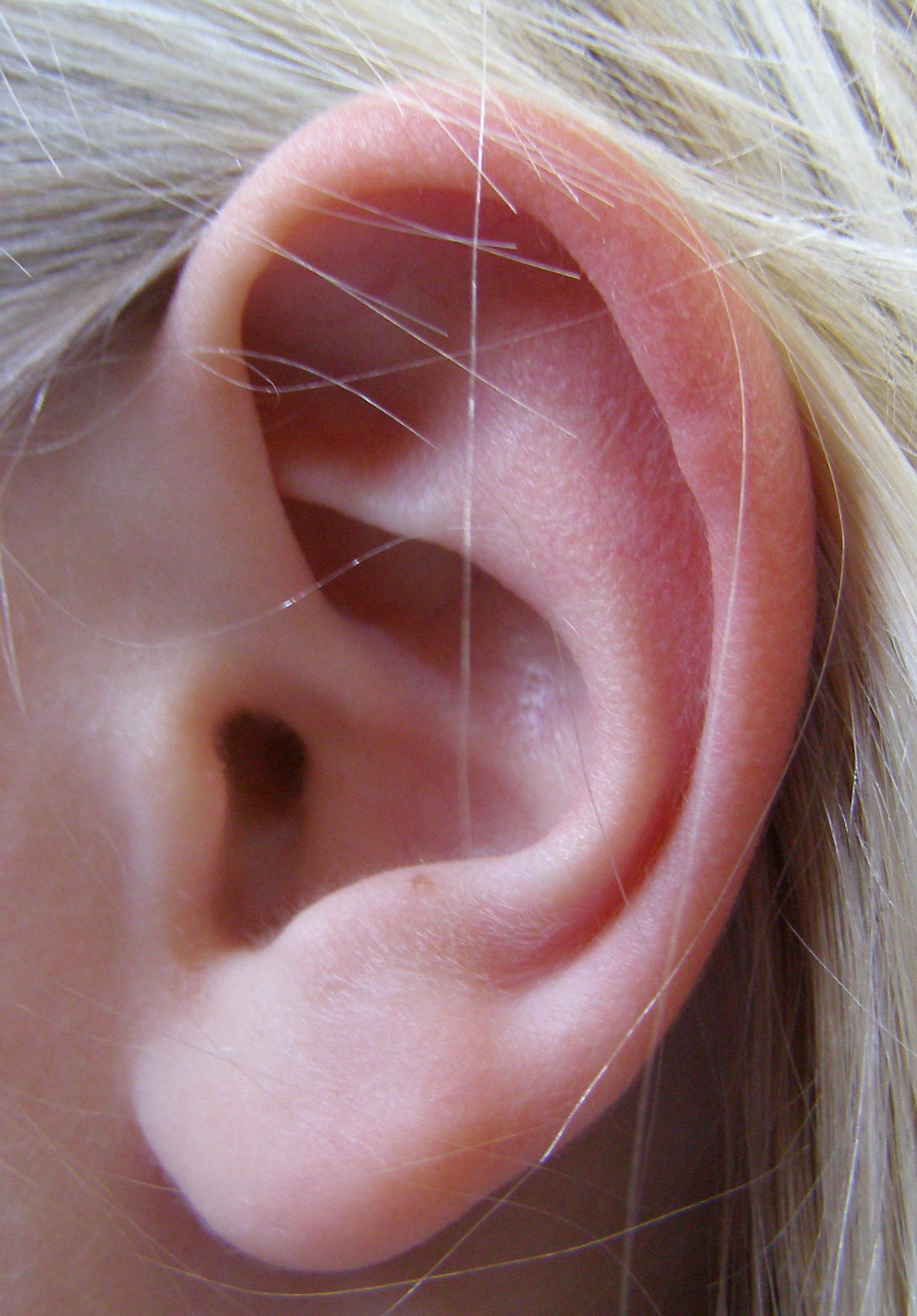
Human ear

=== Auditory cortex ===
Located in the temporal lobe, the auditory cortex is the primary receptive area for sound information. The auditory cortex is composed of Brodmann areas 41 and 42, also known as the anterior transverse temporal area 41 and the posterior transverse temporal area 42, respectively. Both areas act similarly and are integral in receiving and processing the signals transmitted from auditory receptors.

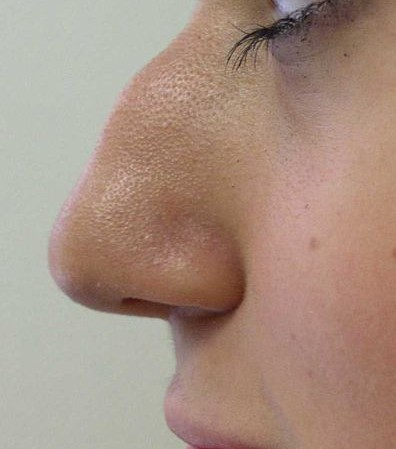
Human nose

=== Primary olfactory cortex ===
Located in the temporal lobe, the primary olfactory cortex is the primary receptive area for olfaction, or smell. Unique to the olfactory and gustatory systems, at least in mammals, is the implementation of both peripheral and central mechanisms of action. The peripheral mechanisms involve olfactory receptor neurons which transduce a chemical signal along the olfactory nerve, which terminates in the olfactory bulb. The chemoreceptors in the receptor neurons that start the signal cascade are G protein-coupled receptors. The central mechanisms include the convergence of olfactory nerve axons into glomeruli in the olfactory bulb, where the signal is then transmitted to the anterior olfactory nucleus, the piriform cortex, the medial amygdala, and the entorhinal cortex, all of which make up the primary olfactory cortex.

In contrast to vision and hearing, the olfactory bulbs are not cross-hemispheric; the right bulb connects to the right hemisphere and the left bulb connects to the left hemisphere.

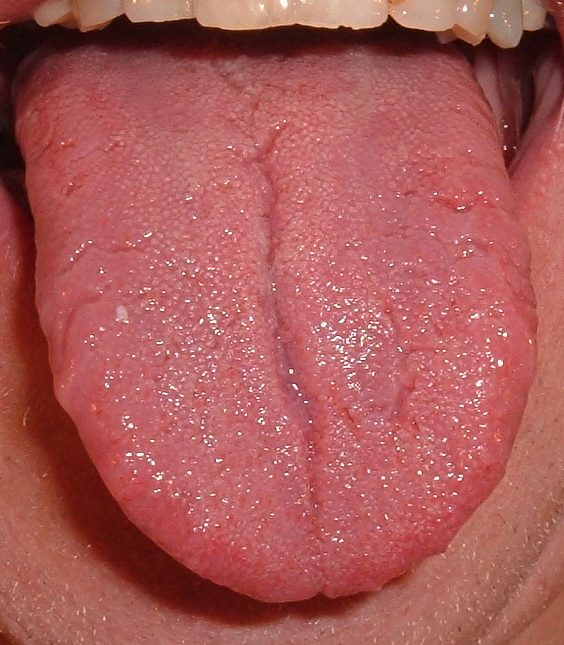
Human tongue

=== Gustatory cortex ===
The gustatory cortex is the primary receptive area for taste. The word taste is used in a technical sense to refer specifically to sensations coming from taste buds on the tongue. The five qualities of taste detected by the tongue include sourness, bitterness, sweetness, saltiness, and the protein taste quality, called umami. In contrast, the term flavor refers to the experience generated through integration of taste with smell and tactile information. The gustatory cortex consists of two primary structures: the anterior insula, located on the insular lobe, and the frontal operculum, located on the frontal lobe. Similarly to the olfactory cortex, the gustatory pathway operates through both peripheral and central mechanisms. Peripheral taste receptors, located on the tongue, soft palate, pharynx, and esophagus, transmit the received signal to primary sensory axons, where the signal is projected to the nucleus of the solitary tract in the medulla, or the gustatory nucleus of the solitary tract complex. The signal is then transmitted to the thalamus, which in turn projects the signal to several regions of the neocortex, including the gustatory cortex.

The neural processing of taste is affected at nearly every stage of processing by concurrent somatosensory information from the tongue, that is, mouthfeel. Scent, in contrast, is not combined with taste to create flavor until higher cortical processing regions, such as the insula and orbitofrontal cortex.

== Quiescent state ==
Most sensory systems have a quiescent state, that is, the state that a sensory system converges to when there is no input.

This is well-defined for a linear time-invariant system, whose input space is a vector space, and thus by definition has a point of zero. It is also well-defined for any passive sensory system, that is, a system that operates without needing input power. The quiescent state is the state the system converges to when there is no input power.

It is not always well-defined for nonlinear, nonpassive sensory organs, since they can't function without input energy. For example, a cochlea is not a passive organ, but actively vibrates its own sensory hairs to improve its sensitivity. This manifests as otoacoustic emissions in healthy ears, and tinnitus in pathological ears. There is still a quiescent state for the cochlea, since there is a well-defined mode of power input that it receives (vibratory energy on the eardrum), which provides an unambiguous definition of "zero input power".

Some sensory systems can have multiple quiescent states depending on its history, like flip-flops, and magnetic material with hysteresis. It can also adapt to different quiescent states. In complete darkness, the retinal cells become extremely sensitive, and there is noticeable "visual snow" caused by the retinal cells firing randomly without any light input. In brighter light, the retinal cells become much less sensitive, consequently decreasing visual noise.

Quiescent state is less well-defined when the sensory organ can be controlled by other systems, like a dog's ears that turn towards the front or the sides as the brain commands. Some spiders can use their nets as a large touch-organ, like weaving a skin for themselves. Even in the absence of anything falling on the net, hungry spiders may increase web thread tension, so as to respond promptly even to usually less noticeable, and less profitable prey, such as small fruit flies, creating two different "quiescent states" for the net.

Things become completely ill-defined for a system which connects its output to its own input, thus ever-moving without any external input. The prime example is the brain, with its default mode network.

== Diseases ==
Disability-adjusted life year for sense organ diseases per 100,000 inhabitants in 2002: no data less than 200 200-400 400-600 600-800 800-1000 1000-1200 1200-1400 1400-1600 1600-1800 1800-2000 2000-2300 more than 2300

- Amblyopia
- Anacusis
- Color blindness
- Deafness

== See also ==
- Multisensory integration
- Neural adaptation
- Neural coding
- Sensor
- Sensory augmentation
- Sensory neuroscience
- Sensory systems in fish
