= Sensory cortex =

Part of the brain responsible for sensing

The sensory cortex can refer sometimes to the primary somatosensory cortex, or it can be used as a term for the primary and secondary cortices of the different senses (two cortices each, on left and right hemisphere): the visual cortex on the occipital lobes, the auditory cortex on the temporal lobes, the primary olfactory cortex on the uncus of the piriform region of the temporal lobes, the gustatory cortex on the insular lobe (also referred to as the insular cortex), and the primary somatosensory cortex on the anterior parietal lobes. Just posterior to the primary somatosensory cortex lies the somatosensory association cortex or area, which integrates sensory information from the primary somatosensory cortex (temperature, pressure, etc.) to construct an understanding of the object being felt. Inferior to the frontal lobes are found the olfactory bulbs, which receive sensory input from the olfactory nerves and route those signals throughout the brain. Not all olfactory information is routed to the olfactory cortex: some neural fibers are routed to the supraorbital region of the frontal lobe, while others are routed directly to limbic structures. The direct limbic connection makes the olfactory sense unique.

The brain cortical regions are related to the auditory, visual, olfactory, and somatosensory (touch, proprioception) sensations, which are located lateral to the lateral fissure and posterior to the central sulcus, that is, more toward the back of the brain. The cortical region related to gustatory sensation is located anterior to the central sulcus.

Note that the central sulcus (sometimes referred to as the central fissure) divides the primary motor cortex (on the precentral gyrus of the posterior frontal lobe) from the primary somatosensory cortex (on the postcentral gyrus of the anterior parietal lobe).

The sensory cortex is involved in somatic sensation, visual stimuli, and movement planning.

== See also ==
- Primary sensory areas
