= Paleocortex =

Region within the telencephalon in the vertebrate brain

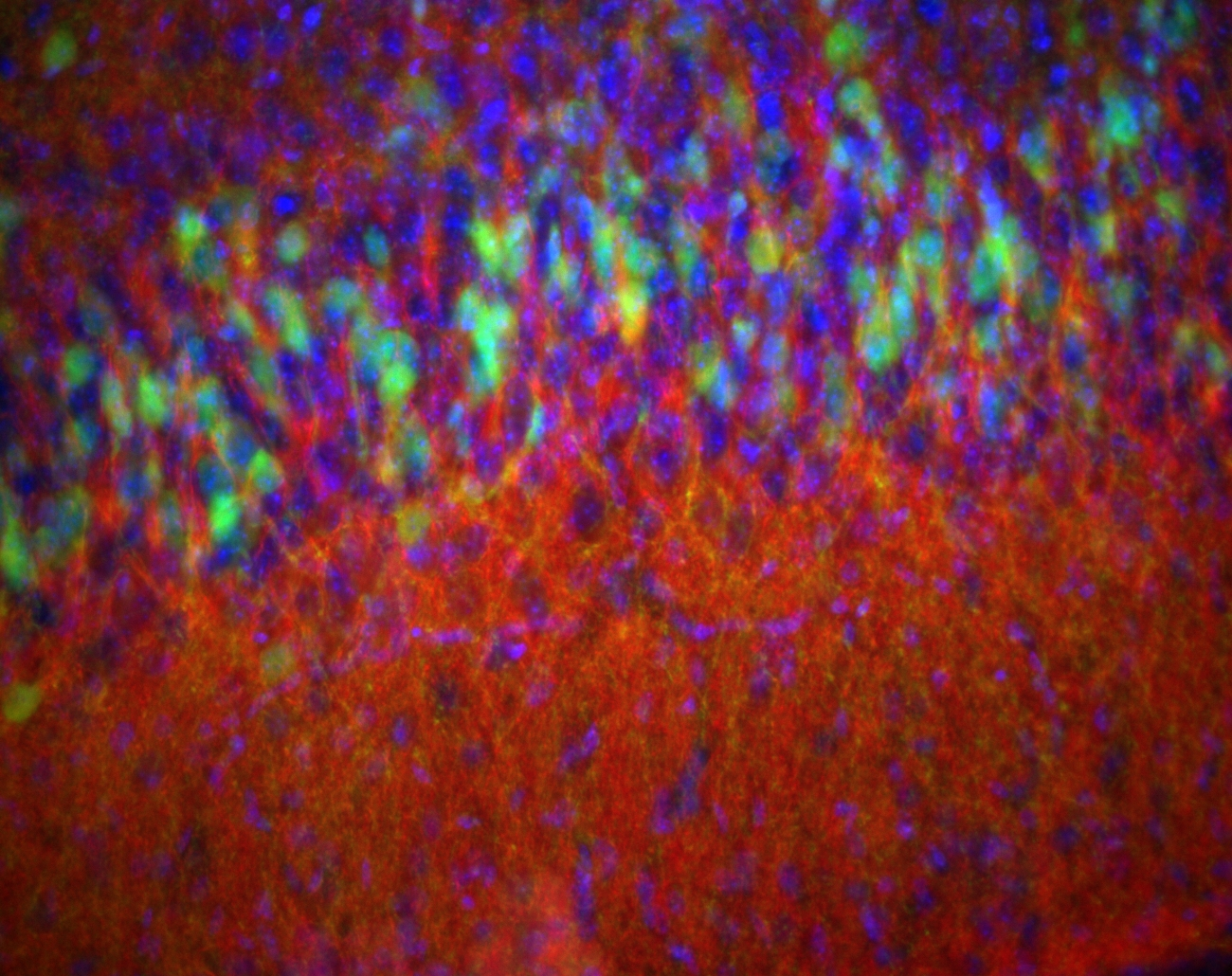
- Piriform cortex from a 14-day-old D2-eGFP (green) mouse stained for enkephalin (red) and DAPI (blue) to show nuclei. Epifluorescence.

Details
- Part of: Cerebral cortex

Identifiers
- Latin: paleocortex
- NeuroNames: 2336
- NeuroLex ID: nlx_143559, birnlex_1097
- TA98: A14.1.09.303
- TA2: 5531
- TE: E5.14.3.4.3.1.33 E5.14.3.4.3.1.34, E5.14.3.4.3.1.33
- FMA: 62430

In anatomy of animals, the paleocortex, or paleopallium, is a region within the telencephalon in the vertebrate brain. This type of cortical tissue consists of three cortical laminae (layers of neuronal cell bodies). In comparison, the neocortex has six layers and the archicortex has three or four layers. Because the number of laminae that compose a type of cortical tissue seems to be directly proportional to both the information-processing capabilities of that tissue and its phylogenetic age, paleocortex is thought to be an intermediate between the archicortex (or archipallium) and the neocortex (or neopallium) in both aspects.

The paleocortex (or paleopallium) and the archicortex (or the archipallium) of the cerebral cortex together constitute the mammalian allocortex or the heterogenetic cortex. The distinction for what is called neocortex or isocortex, which comprises most of the human brain (about 90%), is made from the number of cellular layers that the structure comprises. Neocortical tissue comprises six distinct cell layers, not seen in paleocortical tissues either in adult or developing stage.

In humans the paleocortex is exemplified in the olfactory cortex. For most vertebrates, the olfactory bulb is the main feature of the paleocortex, even though the division is virtually unused outside of a mammalian context.

== Locations ==
Paleocortex is present in the parahippocampal gyrus, olfactory bulb, accessory olfactory bulb, olfactory tubercle, piriform cortex, periamygdalar area, anterior olfactory nucleus, anterior perforated substance, and prepyriform area.

== Parts of the paleocortex ==
- Olfactory bulb
- Piriform cortex
- Anterior olfactory nucleus
- Olfactory tract
- Anterior commissure
- Uncus

== See also ==
- Paralimbic cortex
- List of regions in the human brain
