= Primary olfactory cortex =

Area of the brain involved in the sense of smell

Details
- System: Olfactory system
- Location: Inferior temporal lobe
- Parts: Anterior olfactory nucleus, piriform cortex, olfactory tubercle, amygdala, entorhinal cortex, periamygdaloid cortex
- Function: Sense of smell

Identifiers
- NeuroLex ID: birnlex_2706

The primary olfactory cortex (POC) is a portion of the cerebral cortex. It is found in the inferior part of the temporal lobe of the brain. It receives input from the olfactory tract. It is involved in the sense of smell (olfaction).

== Structure ==
The primary olfactory cortex is in the inferior part of the temporal lobe of the brain. It involves the anterior olfactory nucleus, the piriform cortex, the olfactory tubercle, part of the amygdala, part of the entorhinal cortex, and the periamygdaloid cortex. Some sources state that it also includes the prepyriform area.

The primary olfactory cortex receives fibres from the olfactory tract. It receives input from mitral cells and tufted cells. These cells do not pass through the thalamus. The primary olfactory cortex then sends fibres to the hippocampus, thalamus, and the hypothalamus.

== Function ==
The primary olfactory cortex is involved in the sense of smell (olfaction).
