= Periamygdaloid cortex =

Portion of the rhinencephalon

Details

Identifiers
- Latin: cortex periamygdaloideus
- MeSH: D066277
- NeuroNames: 166
- NeuroLex ID: nlx_144210
- TA98: A14.1.09.415
- TA2: 5550
- FMA: 62485

Periamygdaloid cortex (or periamygdalar area) is a portion of the rhinencephalon consisting of paleocortex. It is a cortical-like nucleus of the amygdaloid complex. Though considered a nucleus, the periamygdalar area is more commonly associated with cortex due to its layered structure and location on the outer surface of the brain.

The periamygdaloid cortex is located on the dorsal surface of the brain bordered by the piriform cortex, entorhinal cortex, perirhinal cortex, periamygdalar claustrum, and anterior amygdaloid area. Its ventromedial and dorsolateral borders are defined by the first myelin bundle of the external capsule, while its remaining borders show no myelinated fiber projections or inputs as well as a higher density of acetylcholinesterase and cholinergic synapses than the neighboring anterior amygdaloid area.

The periamygdaloid cortex plays a role in olfaction, and recent studies have shown that it may be involved in many more processes including opiate addiction, assessment of negative emotions, and depression. Additionally, it has been suggested that the left periamygdalar region may play a role in yawning.

== Olfactory System ==
The periamygdaloid cortex is part of the primary olfactory cortex which receives input from the olfactory bulbs via the lateral olfactory tract. Along with the amygdala, the periamygdaloid cortex conducts cognitive evaluation of the olfactory input it receives and projects it back to the olfactory bulbs.

== Addiction and Depression ==
A study of prodynorphin in the periamygdaloid cortex of humans with heroin addiction found that prodynorphin levels were significantly reduced. Further tests were run to determine the link of heroin metabolites to the prodynorphin to rule out ambiguity, but these tests led researchers to confirm that these decreases in prodynorphin were due to chronic heroin use and not a secondary factor. The mRNA-prodynorphin expression of rats undergoing heroin self-administration showed similar results which, paired with tests of affect, indicate that prodynorphin expression in the periamygdaloid cortex of rats correlates with negative affect. With the rat model results in mind, the study's results suggest that human opiate addicts have a lessened ability to manage negative affect due to the effects of heroin on the periamygdaloid cortex.

Similar to its proposed mechanism of action in heroin addiction, prodynorphin in the periamygdaloid cortex has been shown to be significantly decreased in Major Depressive Disorder sufferers. This further implicates prodynorphin in the control of negative affect in humans and thus suggests that the periamygdaloid cortex is partially responsible for affect in humans.

== Negative Emotion Assessment ==
The activity of various brain regions were assessed during exposure-recognition tasks of static and dynamic facial expressions of anger and happiness. Both the left and right periamygdaloid cortex voxels studied showed differential activation when the subject was tasked with recognizing dynamic expressions of anger compared to neutral, control expressions. This was not observed in static expressions of anger or in any expressions of happiness. These results suggest that the periamygdaloid cortex may be partially responsible for interpreting facial expressions and body language that indicate anger. This demonstrated involvement of the periamygdaloid cortex in dynamic anger assessment adds to the discoveries in more recent research linking the periamygdaloid cortex with prodynorphin expression.
