= Rhinencephalon =

Part of the brain relating to smell

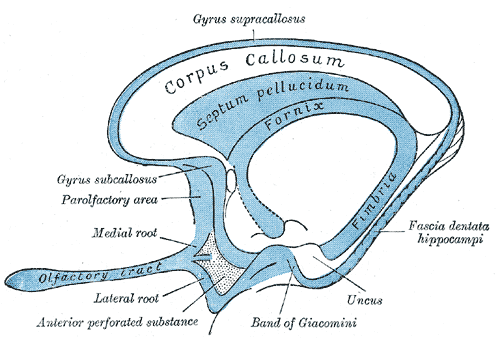
- Scheme of rhinencephalon

Details

Identifiers
- Latin: rhinencephalon
- NeuroNames: 2078

In animal anatomy, the rhinencephalon (from the Greek, ῥίς, rhis = "nose", and ἐγκέφαλος, enkephalos = "brain"), also called the smell-brain or olfactory brain, is a part of the brain involved with smell (i.e. olfaction). It forms the paleocortex in the human brain.

== Components ==
The term rhinencephalon has been used to describe different structures at different points in time.

One definition includes the olfactory bulb, olfactory tract, anterior olfactory nucleus, anterior perforated substance, medial olfactory stria, lateral olfactory stria, parts of the amygdala and prepyriform area.

Some references classify other areas of the brain related to perception of smell as rhinencephalon, but areas of the human brain that receive fibers strictly from the olfactory bulb are limited to those of the paleopallium. As such, the rhinencephalon includes the olfactory bulb, the olfactory tract, the olfactory tubercle and striae, the anterior olfactory nucleus and parts of the amygdala and the piriform cortex.

== In different species ==
The development of the rhinencephalon varies among species. A small area where the frontal lobe meets the temporal lobe and the area of cortex on the uncus of the parahippocampal gyrus (both belonging to the olfactory cortex) have a different structure (so called "allocortex") than most of the telencephalon and are phylogenetically older (so called paleocortex).
