= Periglomerular cell =

Type of olfactory cell

Periglomerular cells mediate lateral inhibition in the olfactory system together with granule cells. They have inhibitory synapses on mitral cells and tufted cells.
