= Olfactory tract =

Part of the olfactory system

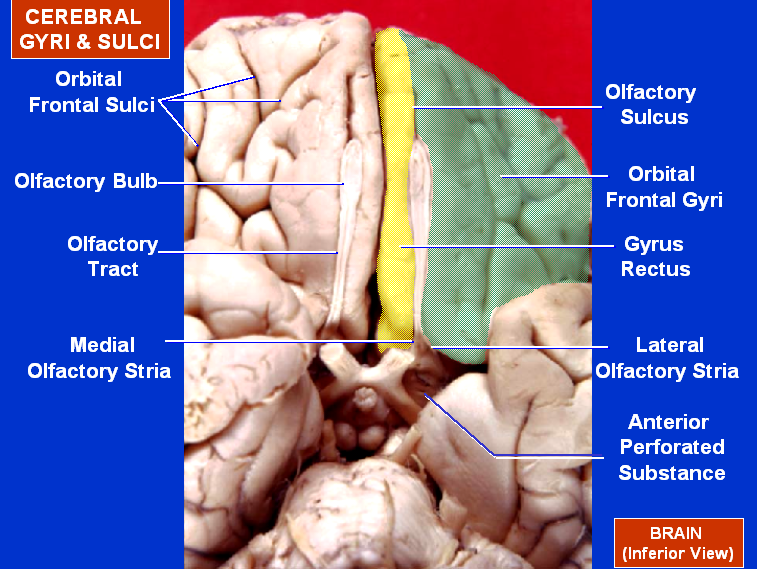
- Olfactory peduncle lying in olfactory sulcus and olfactory striae labelled (anterior at top)

Details
- System: Olfactory system
- Location: Brain

Identifiers
- Latin: tractus olfactorius
- NeuroNames: 283
- NeuroLex ID: birnlex_1663
- TA98: A14.1.09.431
- TA2: 5539
- FMA: 77626

The olfactory tract (olfactory peduncle or olfactory stalk) is a bilateral bundle of afferent nerve fibers from the mitral and tufted cells of the olfactory bulb that connects to several target regions in the brain, including the piriform cortex, amygdala, and entorhinal cortex. It is a narrow white band, triangular on coronal section, the apex being directed upward.

The term olfactory tract is a misnomer, as the olfactory peduncle is actually made up of the juxtaposition of two tracts, the medial olfactory tract (giving the medial and intermediate olfactory stria) and the lateral olfactory tract (giving the lateral and intermediate olfactory stria). However, the existence of the medial olfactory tract (and consequently the medial stria) is controversial in primates (including humans).

== Structure ==
The olfactory peduncle and olfactory bulb lie in the olfactory sulcus a sulcus formed by the medial orbital gyrus on the inferior surface of each frontal lobe. The olfactory peduncles lie in the sulci which run closely parallel to the midline. Fibers of the olfactory peduncle appear to end in the antero-lateral part of the olfactory tubercle, the dorsal and external parts of the anterior olfactory nucleus, the frontal and temporal parts of the prepyriform area, the cortico-medial group of amygdala nuclei and the nucleus of the stria terminalis.

The olfactory peduncle divides posteriorly into three main branches: the medial, intermediate and lateral striae. The olfactory peduncle thus terminates in a triangular structure called the olfactory trigone. Caudal to these elements is the anterior perforated substance, the anterior part of which is marked by the relief of the olfactory tubercle. Finally, projections from the olfactory peduncle to the anterior olfactory nucleus are sometimes grouped together under the name of superior olfactory stria.

The terms olfactory tubercle and olfactory trigone are commonly confused in the literature.

=== Medial olfactory stria ===
The medial olfactory stria is classically described as running medially behind the parolfactory area (hence its name) and terminating in the subcallosal gyrus.

However, this description has been rejected for some fifty years. The medial olfactory stria is now described as terminating much more medially, in the ventral tenia tecta.

=== Intermediate olfactory stria ===
The intermediate olfactory stria is the branch (or branches) extending from the medial or lateral olfactory striae to the olfactory tubercle and anterior perforated substance. Trolard's term "pectineal formation " is used to refer to multiple intermediate striae extending from the lateral olfactory stria.

=== Lateral olfactory stria ===
The lateral olfactory stria is directed across the lateral part of the anterior perforated substance and then bends abruptly medially toward the uncus of the parahippocampal gyrus.

== Clinical significance ==
Destruction to the olfactory peduncle results in ipsilateral anosmia (loss of the ability to smell). Anosmia either total or partial is a symptom of Kallmann syndrome a genetic disorder that results in disruption of the development of the olfactory peduncle. The depth of the olfactory sulcus is an indicator of such congenital anosmia.

== Additional images ==
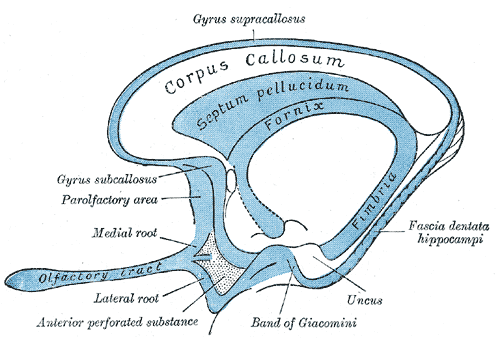
Scheme of rhinencephalon. (Olfactory tract visible at left.)

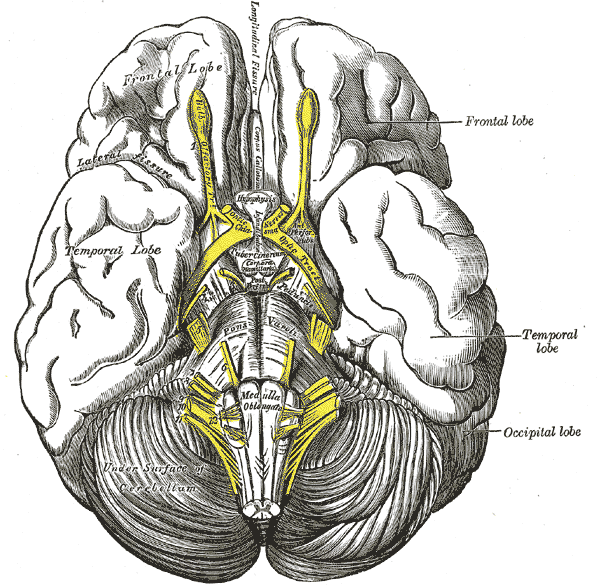
Base of brain.

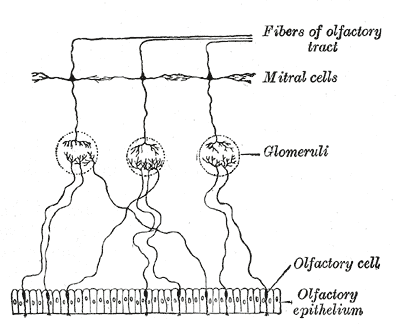
Plan of olfactory neurons.

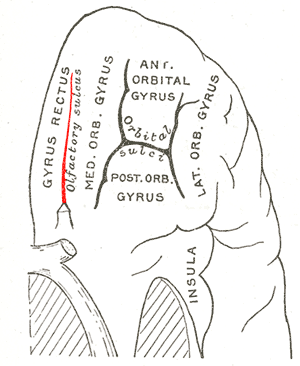
Orbital surface of frontal lobe olfactory sulcus shown in red.
