= Primary sensory areas =

Primary cortical regions of the five sensory systems in the brain

The primary sensory areas are the primary cortical regions of the five sensory systems in the brain (taste, olfaction, touch, hearing and vision). Except for the olfactory system, they receive sensory information from thalamic nerve projections. The term primary comes from the fact that these cortical areas are the first level in a hierarchy of sensory information processing in the brain. This should not be confused with the function of the primary motor cortex, which is the last site in the cortex for processing motor commands.

Though some areas of the human brain that receive primary sensory information remain poorly defined, each of the five sensory modalities has been recognized to relate to specific groups of brain cells that begin to categorize and integrate sensory information.

- Somatosensory system: The primary somatosensory cortex (SI) is across the central sulcus and behind the primary motor cortex configured to generally correspond with the arrangement of nearby motor cells related to specific body parts. The area includes gray matter along the central gyrus and its extension into the postcentral gyrus.
- Taste: The primary gustatory area consists of the anterior part of the insula and the frontal operculum.
- Olfaction: The olfactory cortex is located in the uncus which is found along the ventral surface of the temporal lobe. Olfaction is the only sensory system that is not routed through the thalamus.
- Vision: The visual area known as V1, striate cortex, or (primary visual cortex, Brodmann area 17) is located on the calcarine sulcus deep within the inside folds of the occipital lobe.
- Hearing: The primary auditory cortex is located on the transverse gyri that lie on the back of the superior temporal convolution of the temporal lobes.
