= Anterior olfactory nucleus =

Portion of the forebrain of vertebrates

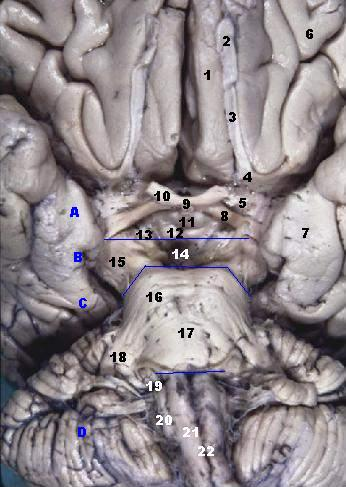
- Human brainstem anterior view (Anterior olfactory nucleus is not labeled, but region is visible at center top, approximately between the "2" and the "3".)

Details

Identifiers
- Latin: nucleus olfactorius anterior
- NeuroNames: 280
- NeuroLex ID: birnlex_1085
- TA98: A14.1.09.416
- TA2: 5543
- FMA: 77628

The anterior olfactory nucleus (AON) also called the anterior olfactory cortex, is a major early processing area for olfaction located behind the olfactory bulb, and in the olfactory tract (olfactory peduncle). The AON connects the olfactory processing centres of both hemispheres.

It is involved in the sense of smell (olfaction), and has influence on other olfactory areas including the olfactory bulb and the piriform cortex. The AON is one of the major secondary structures of olfaction.

== Structure ==
The AON is found behind the olfactory bulb and in front of the piriform cortex (laterally) and olfactory tubercle (medially) in the olfactory tract (also olfactory peduncle) or retrobulbar area. The peduncle contains the AON as well as two other much smaller regions, the ventral and dorsal tenia tecta.

== Function ==
The AON plays a pivotal but relatively poorly understood role in the processing of odor information.

Odors enter the nose (or olfactory rosette in fishes) and interact with the cilia of olfactory receptor neurons. The information is sent via the olfactory nerve (CNI) to the olfactory bulb. After processing in the bulb the signal is transmitted caudally via the axons of mitral cells, and tufted cells in the lateral olfactory tract. The tract forms on the ventrolateral surface of the brain and passes through the AON, continuing on to run the length of the piriform cortex, while synapsing in both regions. The AON distributes the information to the contralateral olfactory bulb and piriform cortex as well as engaging in reciprocal interactions with the ipsilateral bulb and cortex. Therefore, the AON is positioned to regulate information flow between nearly every region where odor information processing occurs.

== Components ==
The AON is composed of two separate structures:

- a) a thin ring of cells encircling the rostral end of the olfactory peduncle known as "pars externa",
- b) the large "pars principalis", seen in coronal sections of most mammalian brains as a two-layered structure.
  - The deepest (Layer II) is a thick ring of pyramidal and other-shaped cells surrounding the anterior limb of the anterior commissure.
  - The outer, cell-poor layer, is often subdivided into a superficial zone (Layer Ia, which contains the output axons from the olfactory bulb) and a deeper area (Layer Ib).
  - Many divide pars principalis on the basis of the 'compass points,' yielding pars dorsalis, pars ventralis, pars medialis, pars lateralis, and pars posterioralis (often combined with pars ventralis to form "pars ventroposterioralis").
