= Olfactory nerve =

Cranial nerve I, for smelling

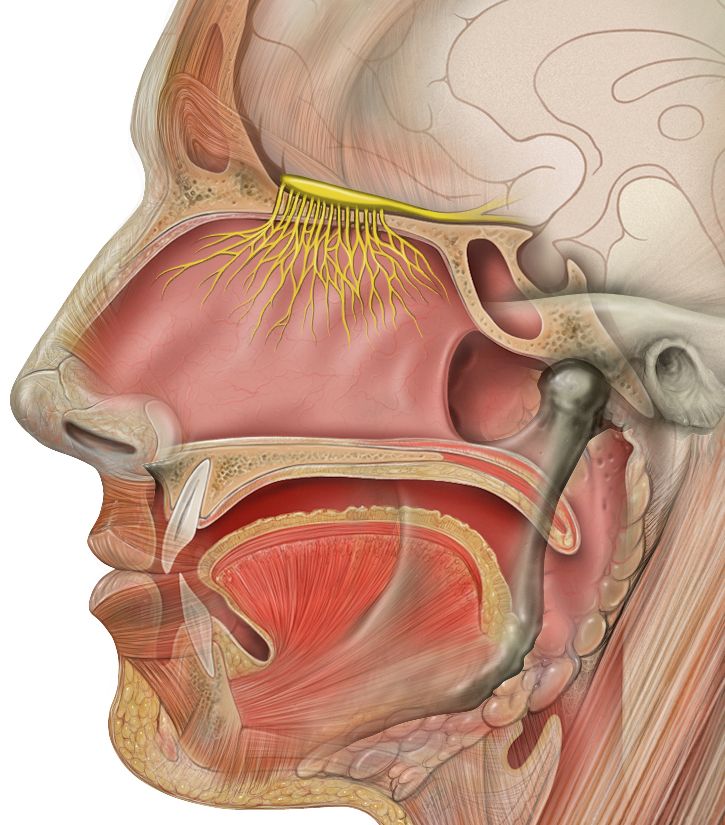
- The olfactory nerve

Details
- Innervates: Smell

Identifiers
- Latin: nervus olfactorius
- MeSH: D009832
- NeuroNames: 32
- TA98: A14.2.01.004; A14.2.01.005
- TA2: 6181
- FMA: 46787

The olfactory nerve, also known as the first cranial nerve, cranial nerve I, or simply CN I, is a cranial nerve that contains sensory nerve fibers relating to the sense of smell.

The afferent nerve fibers of the olfactory receptor neurons transmit nerve impulses about odors to the central nervous system (olfaction). Derived from the embryonic nasal placode, the olfactory nerve is somewhat unusual among cranial nerves because it is capable of some regeneration if damaged. The olfactory nerve is sensory in nature and originates on the olfactory mucosa in the upper part of the nasal cavity. From the olfactory mucosa, the nerve (actually many small nerve fascicles) travels up through the cribriform plate of the ethmoid bone to reach the surface of the brain. Here the fascicles enter the olfactory bulb and synapse there; from the bulbs (one on each side) the olfactory information is transmitted into the brain via the olfactory tract. The fascicles of the olfactory nerve are not visible on a cadaver brain because they are severed upon removal.

== Structure ==
The specialized olfactory receptor neurons of the olfactory nerve are located in the olfactory mucosa of the upper parts of the nasal cavity. The olfactory nerves consist of a collection of many sensory nerve fibers that extend from the olfactory epithelium to the olfactory bulb, passing through the many openings of the cribriform plate, a sieve-like structure of the ethmoid bone.

The sense of smell arises from the stimulation of receptors by small molecules in inspired air of varying spatial, chemical, and electrical properties that reach the nasal epithelium in the nasal cavity during inhalation. These stimulants are transduced into electrical activity in the olfactory neurons, which then transmit these impulses to the olfactory bulb and from there they reach the olfactory areas of the brain via the olfactory tract.

The olfactory nerve is the shortest of the twelve cranial nerves and, similar to the optic nerve, does not emanate from the brainstem.

== Function ==
The olfaction system works to ensure that people can successfully identify an extensive range of odorants and distinguish odors from one another. Odorants interact with the olfactory receptor neurons (ORNs) at the periphery and transmit olfactory information to the central nervous system via axons at the basal surface. These axons aggregate, forming the olfactory nerve. Therefore, the olfactory nerve works to transduce sensory stimuli in the form of odorants and encode them into electrical signals, which are relayed to higher-order centers through synaptic transmission.

=== Odor Transduction ===
Odorants bind to specific odorant receptor proteins contained to the outer surface of olfactory cilia within the olfactory epithelium. Odorant binding to the cilia of an ORN evokes an electrical response, kickstarting odor transduction. An individual ORN contains several microvilli, olfactory cilia, which protrude from a knoblike structure at the apical surface involved in dendritic processes. The olfactory cilia lack the cytoskeletal features of motile cilia and are, therefore, more similar to microvilli like that found in the lungs or gut. Olfactory cilia are actin-rich protrusions supported by scaffolding proteins which help to localize odorant receptors and provide an increased cellular surface for odorant binding.

Homologous to G-protein-coupled receptors (GPCRs), olfactory receptor molecules consist of seven trans-membrane, hydrophobic domains and a cytoplasmic domain with a carboxyl terminal region that interacts with G-proteins and odorants. Once an odorant is bound to an odor receptor protein, the alpha subunit of an olfactory-specific heterotrimeric G-protein, G_{olf}, dissociates and activates olfactory-specific adenylate cyclase, adenylyl cyclase III (ACIII). Activation of ACIII leads to an increase in cyclic AMP (cAMP), which depolarizes the neuron due to an influx of Na+ and Ca2+ by opening cyclic nucleotide-gated ion channels. The neuron is further depolarized by a Ca2+-activated Cl- current travelling from the cilia, where the depolarization first occurred, to the axon hillock of the ORN. At the axon hillock, voltage-gated Na+ channels open and generate an action potential that is transmitted to the olfactory bulb. After transmission, the ORN membrane is repolarized by calcium/calmodulin kinase II-mediated mechanisms that work to extrude Ca2+ and transport Na+ via an Na+/Ca2+ exchanger, diminish cAMP levels by activating phosphodiesterases, and restore heterotrimeric G_{olf.}

ORN axons are responsible for relaying odorant information to CNS through action potentials. The ORN axons leave the olfactory epithelium and travel ipsilaterally to the olfactory bulb where the ORN axons coalesce into multiple clusters, called glomeruli, which together form the olfactory nerve. The ORN axons of each glomerulus synapse with apical dendrites of mitral cells, the primary projection neurons of the olfactory bulb, which create and send action potentials further into the CNS.

=== Regeneration of Olfactory Nerves ===
ORNs directly interact with odorants inhaled into the olfactory epithelium which can also subject the ORNs to damage through continuous exposure to harmful substances such as airborne pollutants, microorganisms, and allergens. Therefore, ORNs maintain a normal cycle of degeneration and regeneration. The olfactory epithelium consists of three main cell types: supporting cells, mature ORNs, and basal cells. Regeneration of ORNs requires the division of basal cells, neural stem cells, to produce new receptor neurons. This regeneration process makes ORNs unique when compared to other neurons.

=== ORN Specificity ===
In the nasal passages, inhaled odorant molecules interact with receptor proteins on localized neuronal cilia of ORNs. These dendritic extensions, cilia, express one type of protein receptor, although individual odorants can interact with multiple different receptor proteins. As new ORNs mature, they have decreased expression levels of multiple olfactory receptor genes, contrasting with mature ORNs firm rule of one neuron—one expressed olfactory receptor gene. Moreover, different odors activate specific ORNs in a molecular and spatial manner due to receptor specificity. Some ORNs contain receptor proteins with high affinity for some odorants, with distinct odor selectivity to a specific chemical structure, while other receptor proteins are less selective.

== Clinical significance ==
=== Examination ===
Damage to this nerve leads to impairment or total loss of the sense of smell (anosmia). To simply test the function of the olfactory nerve, each nostril is tested with a pungent odor. If the odor is smelled, the olfactory nerve is likely functioning. On the other hand, the nerve is only one of several reasons that could explain if the odor is not smelled. There are olfactory testing packets in which strong odors are embedded into cards and the responses of the patient to each odor can be determined.

=== Lesions ===
Lesions to the olfactory nerve can occur because of "blunt trauma", such as coup-contrecoup damage, meningitis, and tumors of the frontal lobe of the brain. These injuries often lead to a reduced ability to taste and smell. Lesions of the olfactory nerve do not lead to a reduced ability to sense pain from the nasal epithelium. This is because pain from the nasal epithelium is not carried to the central nervous system by the olfactory nerve - it is carried to the central nervous system by the trigeminal nerve.

=== Aging and smell ===
A decrease in the ability to smell is a normal consequence of human aging, and usually is more pronounced in men than in women. It is often unrecognized in patients except that they may note a decreased ability to taste (much of taste is actually based on reception of food odor). Some of this decrease results from repeated damage to the olfactory nerve receptors due likely to repeated upper respiratory infections. Patients with Alzheimer's disease almost always have an abnormal sense of smell when tested.

=== Pathway to the brain ===
Some nanoparticles entering the nose are transported to the brain via olfactory nerve. This can be useful for nasal administration of medications. It can be harmful when the particles are soot or magnetite in air pollution.

In naegleriasis, "brain-eating" amoeba enter through the olfactory mucosa of the nasal tissues and follow the olfactory nerve fibers into the olfactory bulbs and then the brain.

== Additional images ==
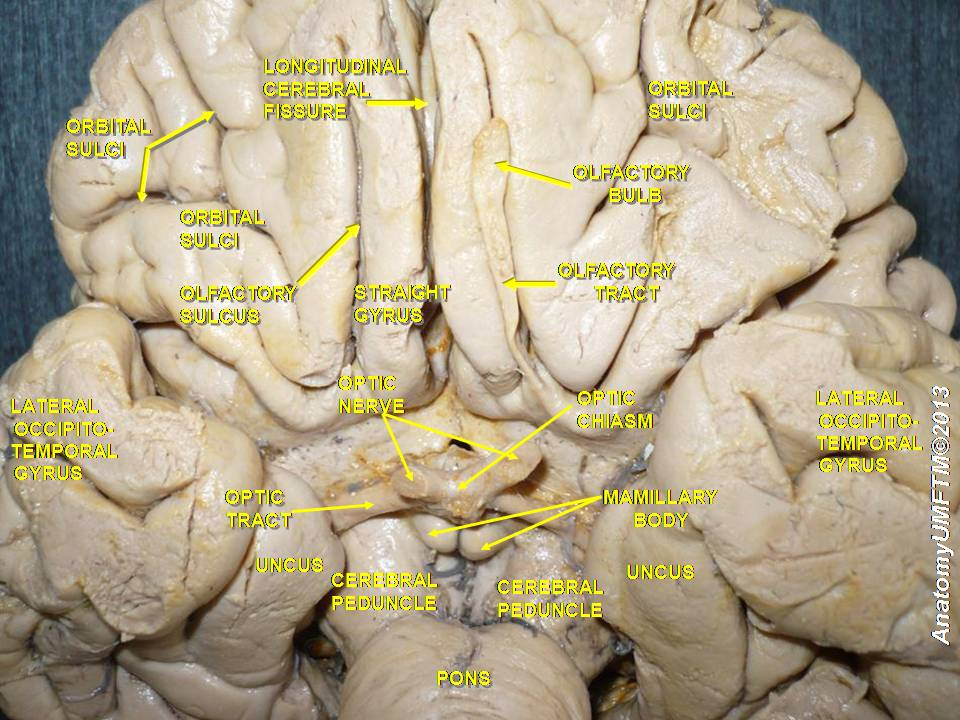
Olfactory nerve, deep dissection, inferior view

== See also ==
- Anterior olfactory nucleus
- Phantosmia
