= Prepyriform area =

Anatomical structure of the brain

Details

Identifiers
- Latin: area praepiriformis

Prepyriform area (or prepiriform cortex) is a portion of the rhinencephalon consisting of paleocortex.

Some sources state that it is part of the primary olfactory cortex. Prepyriform Cortex along with Pyriform cortex And Cortical portion of amygdaloid nuclei constitute lateral olfactory area which send signal to almost all portion of limbic system such as hippocampus, which seem to be most important area for learning to like and dislike foods depending upon one's experience with them.
