= Glomerulus (olfaction) =

Structure in the brain's olfactory bulb

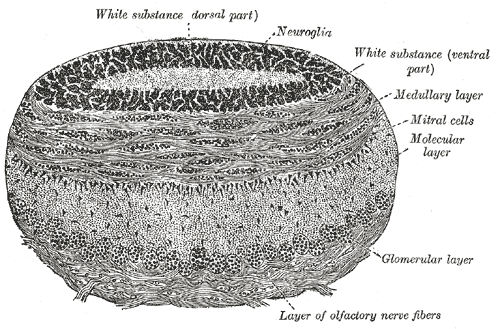
- Coronal section of olfactory bulb.

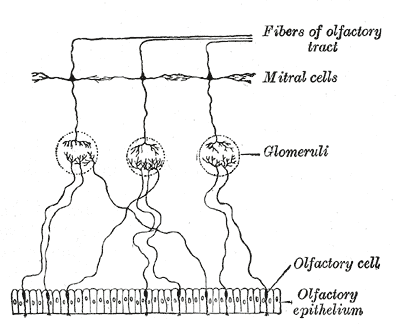
- Plan of olfactory neurons.

Identifiers
- NeuroLex ID: nlx_anat_1005011

The glomerulus (pl.: glomeruli) is a spherical structure located in the olfactory bulb of the brain where synapses form between the terminals of the olfactory nerve and the dendrites of mitral, periglomerular and tufted cells. Each glomerulus is surrounded by a heterogeneous population of juxtaglomerular neurons (that include periglomerular, short axon, and external tufted cells) and glial cells.

All glomeruli are located near the surface of the olfactory bulb. The olfactory bulb also includes a portion of the anterior olfactory nucleus, the cells of which contribute fibers to the olfactory tract. They are the initial sites for synaptic processing of odor information coming from the nose. A glomerulus is made up of a globular tangle of axons from the olfactory receptor neurons, and dendrites from the mitral and tufted cells, as well as, from cells that surround the glomerulus such as the external tufted cells, periglomerular cells, short axon cells, and astrocytes. In mammals, glomeruli typically range between 50 and 120 μm in diameter and number between 1100 and 2400 depending on the species, with roughly between 1100 and 1200 in humans. The number of glomeruli in a human decreases with age; in humans that are over 80 they are nearly absent. Each glomerulus is composed of two compartments, the olfactory nerve zone and the non-olfactory nerve zone. The olfactory nerve zone is composed of preterminals and terminals of the olfactory nerve and is where the olfactory receptor cells make synapses on their targets. The non-olfactory nerve zone is composed of the dendritic processes of intrinsic neurons and is where dendrodendritic interactions between intrinsic neurons occur.

== Structure ==
Glomeruli are important waystations in the pathway from the nose to the olfactory cortex and have been found to be critical for odorant signal transduction. The olfactory receptor neurons (ORN), which originate in the nasal epithelium express only one type of olfactory receptor (OR). These ORNs then project their axons to the olfactory bulb. In the olfactory bulb, the ORNs synapse with termination in the glomeruli. Each glomerulus receives input from olfactory receptor neurons expressing only one type of olfactory receptor. The glomerular activation patterns within the olfactory bulb are thought to represent the quality of the odor being detected. These activation patterns of glomeruli can change due to changes in airflow rate and odor concentration in the mucus layer of the nasal cavity. A certain odorant can activate a glomeruli strongly whilst affecting others with less efficiency to very little at all. Linda Buck and Richard Axel were awarded a Nobel prize in 2004 for heavily influencing the working out of the genetic basis for this Olfactory coding.

The current dogma is that axons from all ORNs expressing the same receptor converge onto one or two glomeruli of a possible 1800 glomeruli in each olfactory bulb. As the axons of the ORNs migrate towards their specific glomeruli they often overshoot into neighboring glomeruli. Thus, a glomerulus representing a specific OR develops slowly and involves considerable axonal reorganization in order to achieve the highly topographical projection observed in adult mice.

== Function ==
The glomerulus is the basic unit in the odor map of the olfactory bulb. Each odor activates a different pattern of glomeruli, such that, simply by analyzing the different sets of activated glomeruli, one could, in theory, decode the identity of the odor. This odor map, however, is modified by the circuitry within the olfactory bulb so that the spiking pattern of the second-order mitral cells is usually different from that of the olfactory sensory neurons.

== Other species ==
=== Glomerulus in dogs ===
The glomerulus process in dogs is divided in 3 parts: signal acquisition, signal transduction, and signal processing. Some dogs have as many as 100 times more ORNs than humans do, producing a correspondingly sharpened ability to detect and discriminate among millions of odors. Characteristics of these stages include: the role of olfactory plume and sniffing, the continuous renewal of Glomerulus receptors throughout the life cycle, and the relationship between the olfactory neuron and the glomerulus, and finally, the synthetic nature of glomerulus coding.

=== Glomerulus in fish ===
One of the most distinctive features of fish olfaction is that it takes place entirely in the aquatic environment. The carrier of stimulant is water and therefore the chemicals must be soluble in water. The olfactory epithelium of fish consists of three cell types, like other vertebrates. These three cell types are the receptor cells, supporting cells and basal cells.

Fish glomerulus differs from the mammalian glomerulus in terms of the number of dendrites that it receives from the mitral cells. In a mammalian olfactory system, a single dendrite from a mitral cell enters a single glomerulus. However, in fish, one or more dendrites from mitral cells enter one or more glomerulus.
