= Tufted cell =

Neuron in the olfactory bulb

Tufted cells are found within the olfactory glomeruli. They receive input from the receptor cells of the olfactory epithelium found in areas of the nose able to sense smell. Both tufted cells and mitral cells are projection neurons. Projection neurons send the signals from the glomeruli deeper into the brain. The actual signal sent through these projection cells has been sharpened or filtered by a process called lateral inhibition. Both the periglomerular cells and the granule cells contribute to lateral inhibition. Projection neurons therefore transmit a sharpened olfactory signal to the deeper parts of the brain. Tufted cells project onto the anterior piriform cortex.

== See also ==
- Mitral cell—Another neuron in the olfactory glomerulus
