= Olfactory tubercle =

Area at the bottom of the forebrain

- Approximate location of the olfactory tubercle in the brain

Details
- Part of: Mesolimbic pathway Ventral striatum; Olfactory cortex
- Parts: Medial tubercle Lateral tubercle

Identifiers
- Latin: tuberculum olfactorium
- Acronym(s): OT
- MeSH: D066208
- TA98: A14.1.09.433
- TA2: 5544

The olfactory tubercle (OT), also known as the tuberculum olfactorium, is a multi-sensory processing center that is contained within the olfactory cortex and ventral striatum and plays a role in reward cognition. The OT has also been shown to play a role in locomotor and attentional behaviors, particularly in relation to social and sensory responsiveness, and it may be necessary for behavioral flexibility. The OT is interconnected with numerous brain regions, especially the sensory, arousal, and reward centers, thus making it a potentially critical interface between processing of sensory information and the subsequent behavioral responses.

The OT is a composite structure that receives direct input from the olfactory bulb and contains the morphological and histochemical characteristics of the ventral pallidum and the striatum of the forebrain. The dopaminergic neurons of the mesolimbic pathway project onto the GABAergic medium spiny neurons of the nucleus accumbens and olfactory tubercle (receptor D3 is abundant in these two areas). In addition, the OT contains tightly packed cell clusters known as the islands of Calleja, which consist of granule cells. Even though it is part of the olfactory cortex and receives direct input from the olfactory bulb, it has not been shown to play a role in processing of odors.

== Structure ==
The olfactory tubercle differs in location and relative size between humans, other primates, rodents, birds, and other animals. In most cases, the olfactory tubercle is identified as a round bulge along the basal forebrain anterior to the optic chiasm and posterior to the olfactory peduncle. In humans and other primates, visual identification of the olfactory tubercle is not easy because the basal forebrain bulge is small in these animals. With regard to functional anatomy, the olfactory tubercle can be considered to be a part of three larger networks. First, it is considered to be part of the basal forebrain, the nucleus accumbens, and the amygdaloid nuclei because of its location along the rostral ventral region of the brain, that is, the front-bottom part. Second, it is considered to be part of the olfactory cortex because it receives direct input from the olfactory bulb. Third, it is also considered to be part of the ventral striatum based on anatomy, neurochemical, and embryology data.

One of the most striking features of the olfactory tubercle is the closely packed crescent-shape cell clusters, which are located mostly in layer III and sometimes in layer II. These cell clusters, called the islands of Calleja, are innervated by dopaminergic projections from the nucleus accumbens and the substantia nigra, suggesting the role that the olfactory tubercle plays in the reward system.

The olfactory tubercle is a multi-sensory processing center due to the number of innervations going to and from other brain regions such as the amygdala, thalamus, hypothalamus, hippocampus, brain stem, auditory and visual sensory fibers, and a number of structures in the reward–arousal system, as well as the olfactory cortex. Due to its many innervations from other brain regions, the olfactory tubercle is involved in merging information across the senses, such as olfactory/audition and olfactory/visual integrations, possibly in a behaviorally relevant manner. Thus, damage to the olfactory tubercle is likely to affect the functionality of all these areas of the brain. Examples of such disruption include changes in normal odor-guided behavior, and impairments in modulating state and motivational behavior, which are common in psychiatric disorders such as schizophrenia, dementia and depression.

The olfactory tubercle has been shown to play a large role in behavior. Unilateral lesions in the olfactory tubercle have been shown to alter attention, social and sensory responsiveness, and even locomotor behavior. Bilateral lesions have been shown to reduce copulatory behavior in male rats. The olfactory tubercle has also been shown to be especially involved in reward and addictive behaviors. Rats have been shown to administer cocaine into the olfactory tubercle more than the nucleus accumbens and ventral pallidum, other reward centers in the brain. In fact, they will administer cocaine into the olfactory tubercle at about 200 times per hour and even till death.

Functional contributions of the olfactory tubercle to olfaction are currently unclear; however, there is evidence of a perceptual role that it may play. Work from Zelano, et al. suggest that the olfactory tubercle may be crucial in sorting out the sources of olfactory information. This suggests that it may also play a role in odor guided behavior. Thus, it may link perception of odor with action through its connections with attention, reward, and motivation systems of the basal forebrain. Functional imaging data from this same group also shows that the olfactory tubercle is highly activated during tasks that engage attention, thus playing a large role in arousal-related systems.

Because the olfactory tubercle is a component of the ventral striatum, it is heavily interconnected with several affective-, reward-, and motivation-related centers of the brain. It also sits at the interface between the olfactory sensory input and state-dependent behavioral modulatory circuits, that is the area that modulates behavior during certain physiological and mental states. Thus, the olfactory tubercle may also play an important role in the mediation of odor approach and odor avoidance behavior, probably in a state-dependent manner.

=== Anatomy ===
In general, the olfactory tubercle is located at the basal forebrain of the animal within the medial temporal lobe. Specifically, parts of the tubercle are included in the olfactory cortex and nested between the optic chiasm and olfactory tract and ventral to the nucleus accumbens. The olfactory tubercle consists of three layers, a molecular layer (layer I), the dense cell layer (layer II), and the multiform layer (layer III). Other than the islands of Calleja, which are characteristic of the tubercle, it is also noted for the being innervated by dopaminergic neurons from the ventral tegmental area. The olfactory tubercle also consists of heterogeneous elements, such as medial forebrain bundle, and has a ventral extension of the striatal complex. During the 1970s, the tubercle was found to contain a striatal component which is composed of GABAergic medium spiny neurons. The GABAergic neurons project to the ventral pallidum and receive glutamatergic inputs from cortical regions and dopaminergic inputs from the ventral tegmental area.

=== Morphological and neurochemical features ===
The ventral portion of the olfactory tubercle consists of three layers, whereas the dorsal portion contains dense cell clusters and adjoins the ventral pallidum (within the basal ganglia). The structure of the most ventral and anterior parts of the tubercle can be defined as anatomically defined hills (consisting of gyri and sulci) and clusters of cells.

The most common cell types in the olfactory tubercle are medium-size dense spine cells found predominantly in layer II (dense cell layer). The dendrites of these cells are covered by substance p immunoreactive (S.P.I) axons up into layer III (multiform layer). These cells also project into the nucleus accumbens and caudate putamen, thus linking the olfactory tubercle with the pallidum. Other medium-size cells reside in layers II and III of the olfactory tubercle as well. These include the spine-poor neurons and spindle cells and they differ from the medium-size dense spine cells because they have sparse dendritic trees. The largest cells, and most striking feature of the olfactory tubercle, are densely packed crescent-shape cell clusters, Islands of Calleja that reside mostly in the dorsal portion of the olfactory tubercle, layer III, and can also be found in layer II. The olfactory tubercle also contains three classes of small cells found mostly in layers I and II. The first are pial cells (named as such because of location near pial surface), which look like miniature medium-size dense spine cells. The second are radiate cells and are easily identified by numerous multi-directional spineless dendrites. The third, small spine cells, are similar to the pial cells in that they also look like medium-size spine cells except they are not located near the pial surface.

=== Development ===
Migrating cells from several developmental sites come together to form the olfactory tubercle. This includes the ventral ganglionic eminence (found in ventral part of telencephalon, where they form bulges in the ventricles that later become the basal ganglia, present only in embryonic stages) and the rostromedial telencephalic wall (of the forebrain). Olfactory tubercle neurons originate as early as embryonic day 13 (E13), and the cell development occurs in a layer specific manner. The emergence of the three main layers of the olfactory tubercle begins almost simultaneously. The large neurons in layer III originate from E13 to E16, while the small and medium originate between E15 and E20. Like the small and medium cells in layer III, the cells of layer II and the striatal bridges also originate between E15 and E20 and develop in a lateral to medial gradient. The granule cells of the islands of calleja originate between E19 and E22 and continue to migrate into the islands until long after birth.

Fibers from the lateral olfactory tract begin branching into the olfactory tubercle around E17. The lateral portion of the olfactory tubercle (which adjoins the olfactory tract) receives the densest fiber input and the medial portion receives light fiber projections. This branching continues until completion about the end of the first week after birth.

== Function ==
=== Multi-sensory processes ===
The olfactory tubercle plays a functional role in the multisensory integration of olfactory information with extra modal senses. Auditory sensory information may arrive at the olfactory tubercle via networks involving the hippocampus and ventral pallidum or directly from the olfactory cortex, thus showing a possible role of the olfactory tubercle in olfactory auditory sensory integration. This convergence has been shown to cause the perception of sound, caused by the interaction between smell and sound. This possibility has been supported by work from where olfactory tubercle displayed olfactory–auditory convergence.

Retinal projections have also been found in layer II of the olfactory tubercle, suggesting that it constitutes a region of olfactory and visual convergence. These visual sensory fibers arrive from the retinal ganglion cells. Thus, the olfactory tubercle may play a role in the perception of odors when a visual source is identified.

As far as olfaction is concerned, in vitro data from some studies suggest that the olfactory tubercle units have the functional capability of other olfactory center neurons in processing odor. It has been suggested that the olfactory tubercle may be crucial in determining the source of olfactory information and responds to odor inhalations that are attended to.

=== Role in behavior ===
The olfactory tubercle has been shown to be concerned primarily with the reception of sensory impulses from olfactory receptors. Because of its connections to regions like the amygdala and hippocampus, the olfactory tubercle may play a role in behavior. Rats rely heavily on olfactory sensory input from olfactory receptors for behavioral attitudes. Studies show that bilateral lesions in the olfactory tubercle significantly reduce stereotyped behavior such as copulatory behavior in male rats and a reduction in sniffing and chewing behaviors. These stereotyped inhibitions may have been caused by the removal of central neuronal processes other than the dopaminergic cells in the olfactory tubercle. Unilateral lesions have been shown to alter attention, social and sensory responsiveness, and even locomotor behavior in rats.

=== Arousal and reward ===
The dopaminergic neurons from the ventral tegmental area that innervate the olfactory tubercle enable the tubercle to play roles in reward and arousal and appears to partially mediate cocaine reinforcement. The anteromedial portions of the tubercle have been shown to mediate some of the rewarding effects of drugs like cocaine and amphetamine. This has been shown in studies where rats learn to self-administer cocaine at significantly high rates into the tubercle. Injections of cocaine into the tubercle induce robust locomotion and rearing behavior in rats.

== Clinical significance ==
The multi-sensory nature of the olfactory tubercle and the many innervations it receives from other brain regions, especially the direct input from the olfactory bulb and innervations from the ventral tegmental area, makes it likely to be involved in several psychiatric disorders in which olfaction and dopamine receptors are affected. Many studies have found reduced olfactory sensitivity in patients with major depressive disorders (MDD) and dementia and schizophrenia. Patients with MDD have been shown to have reduced olfactory bulb and olfactory cortex as compared to normal people. In dementias, especially of the Alzheimer's disease type, the olfactory bulb, anterior olfactory nucleus, and orbitofrontal cortex, all areas of the brain that process olfaction are affected. The deficits observed in dementia include decrease in odor threshold sensitivity, odor identification and odor memory. Patients with schizophrenia exhibit deficits in olfactory discrimination that are not seen in patients with other psychiatric disorders not mentioned here. Rupp, et al. found that in patients with schizophrenia olfactory sensitivity and discrimination as well as higher order identification abilities are reduced. As mentioned earlier, the olfactory tubercle may be involved in the perception of odors due to the inputs received from the bulb and thus, by extension, may play a role in these psychiatric disorders.

== History ==
The olfactory tubercle was first described by Albert von Kölliker in 1896, who studied them in rats. Since then, there have been several histological and histochemical studies; done in this area to identify it in other rodents, cats, humans, non-human primates, and other species. Similar studies were done by several authors to find the cell composition and innervations to and from other regions in the OT. Over the years, several other methods have been employed to find the possible functions and role of the OT in the brain. These began with lesion studies and early electrophysiological recordings. Improvements in technology have made it possible to now place multiple electrodes in the olfactory tubercle and record from anesthetized and even awake animals participating in behavioral tasks.

== See also ==
- Mesolimbic pathway
