= Mitral cell =

Neurons that are part of the olfactory system

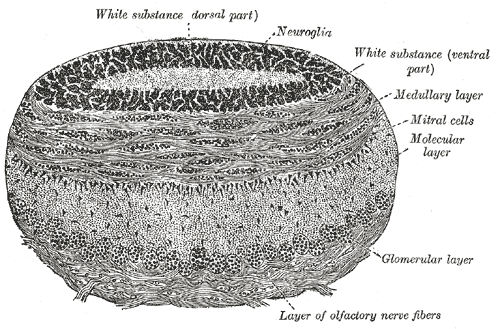
- Coronal section of olfactory bulb.

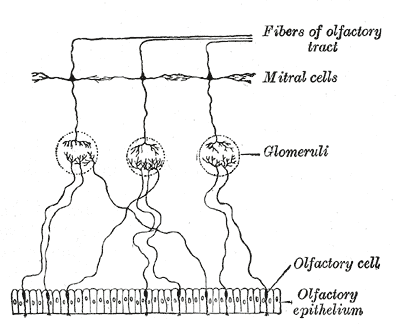
- Plan of olfactory neurons.

Details
- System: Smell
- Location: Olfactory bulb of mammals

Identifiers
- NeuroLex ID: nifext_120

Mitral cells are neurons that are part of the olfactory system. They are located in the olfactory bulb in the mammalian central nervous system. They receive information from the axons of olfactory receptor neurons, forming synapses in neuropils called glomeruli. Axons of the mitral cells transfer information to a number of areas in the brain, including the piriform cortex, entorhinal cortex, and amygdala. Mitral cells receive excitatory input from olfactory sensory neurons and external tufted cells on their primary dendrites, whereas inhibitory input arises either from granule cells onto their lateral dendrites and soma or from periglomerular cells onto their dendritic tuft. Mitral cells together with tufted cells form an obligatory relay for all olfactory information entering from the olfactory nerve. Mitral cell output is not a passive reflection of their input from the olfactory nerve. In mice, each mitral cell sends a single primary dendrite into a glomerulus receiving input from a population of olfactory sensory neurons expressing identical olfactory receptor proteins, yet the odor responsiveness of the 20-40 mitral cells connected to a single glomerulus (called sister mitral cells) is not identical to the tuning curve of the input cells, and also differs between sister mitral cells. Odorant response properties of individual neurons in an olfactory glomerular module. The exact type of processing that mitral cells perform with their inputs is still a matter of controversy. One prominent hypothesis is that mitral cells encode the strength of an olfactory input into their firing phases relative to the sniff cycle. A second hypothesis is that the olfactory bulb network acts as a dynamical system that decorrelates to differentiate between representations of highly similar odorants over time. Support for the second hypothesis comes primarily from research in zebrafish (where mitral and tufted cells cannot be distinguished).

== Structure ==
Mitral cells are a neuronal cell type in the mammalian olfactory bulb, distinguished by the position of their somata located in an orderly row in the mitral cell layer of the bulb. They typically have a single primary dendrite, which they project into a single glomerulus in the glomerular layer, and a few lateral dendrites that project laterally in the external plexiform layer. Mitral cells are closely related to the second type of projection neuron in the mammalian bulb, known as the tufted cell. In lower vertebrates, mitral cells cannot be morphologically distinguished from tufted cells, and both are substantially morphologically different from the mammalian mitral cells. The cells often have multiple primary dendrites innervating different glomeruli and they are sometimes called simply projection neurons, to indicate that they are the main neural element which project outside the olfactory bulb. The morphology of mitral cells was an advantage in early studies of synaptic processing, because the soma and the primary dendrite could be independently stimulated by appropriate positioning of stimulating electrodes in different layers of the olfactory bulb.

== Function ==
=== Synaptic processing ===
Mitral cells are a key part of the olfactory bulb microcircuit. Mitral cells receive input from at least four cell types: olfactory sensory neurons, periglomerular neurons, external tufted cells and granule cells. The synapses made by external tufted cells and olfactory sensory neurons are excitatory, whereas those of granule cells and periglomerular neurons are inhibitory. In addition, sister mitral cells are reciprocally connected by gap junctions. The mitral to granule and mitral to periglomerular cell synapse was the first description of the rather atypical reciprocal dendrodendritic synapses (in contrast to the more common axodendritic synapse). The action of the full glomerular microcircuit is a topic that is under intense scientific investigation. Certain principles are starting to emerge. One discovery points to the idea of the microcircuit between mitral, tufted and periglomerular cells in separating the output of mitral and tufted cells in time. It appears that tufted cells receive strong olfactory nerve input, fire close to inhalation onset and their firing phase is relatively concentration insensitive, whereas mitral cells receive relatively weak olfactory nerve input and strong periglomerular inhibition, which delays their firing relative to the tufted cells. This escape from inhibition can be sped up by increasing the stimulating odorant concentration, and thus mitral cell firing phase acts as one possible way the olfactory system encodes concentration. The role of the mitral cell lateral dendrite and granule cell circuit is currently a bit more uncertain. One possible hypothesis implicates the system in forming sparse representation which enable more effective pattern separation. The action of this circuit is heavily influenced by both short term and long term plasticity and ongoing granule cell neurogenesis. The circuit requires the animal to be awake if it is to have full functionality.

=== Projection targets ===
Mitral and tufted cells project to various targets in the brain. Most importantly, projections target the olfactory cortex, where odor information can be integrated with input from other sensory modalities and used to drive behavior. Tufted cells project mainly to the anterior olfactory nucleus, a center that also performs comparison between left and right side olfactory input. Mitral cells project to the olfactory tubercle, where chemical information is integrated with auditory signals. Mitral cells carrying pheromonal inputs project to the amygdala and hypothalamus to drive instinctive behaviors. A major integrative center is the piriform cortex, where mitral cells make non-topographic projections to pyramidal cells which integrate information across glomeruli. Projections also go to the entorhinal cortex. Anatomical connectivity of a mitral cell axon can be quite different depending on the target structure. Whereas piriform cortex is innervated mostly randomly, projections to the anterior olfactory nucleus and amygdala retain some topographic order. Finally, mitral cell axons also make intrabulbar connections to granule cells and in the mouse olfactory system they project selectively to granule cells underlying the second ipsilateral homotypic (expressing the same olfactory receptor) glomerulus.
