= Uncus =

Structure in the brain

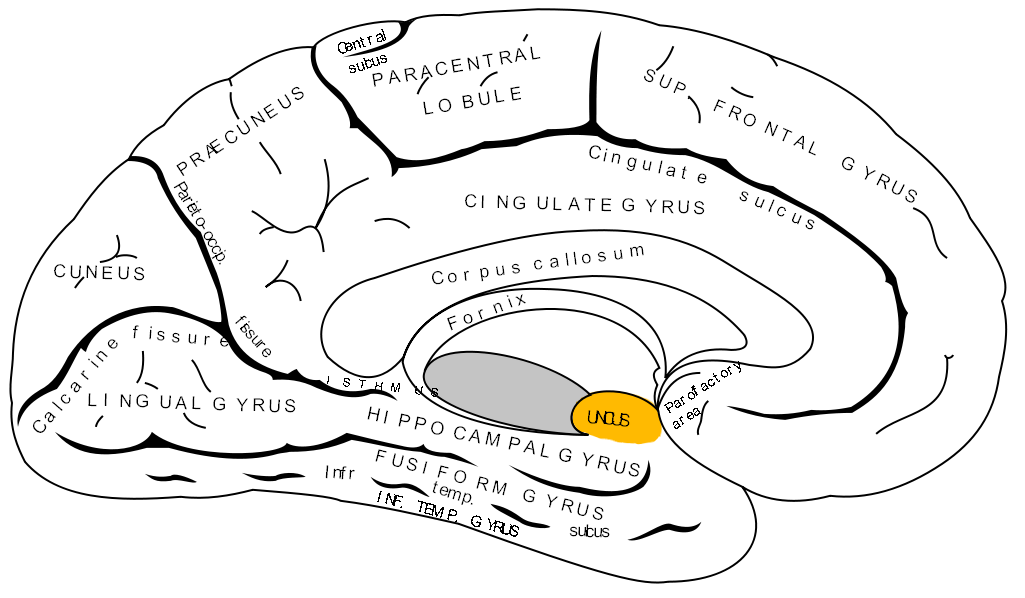
- Medial surface of left cerebral hemisphere. Uncus is shown in orange.

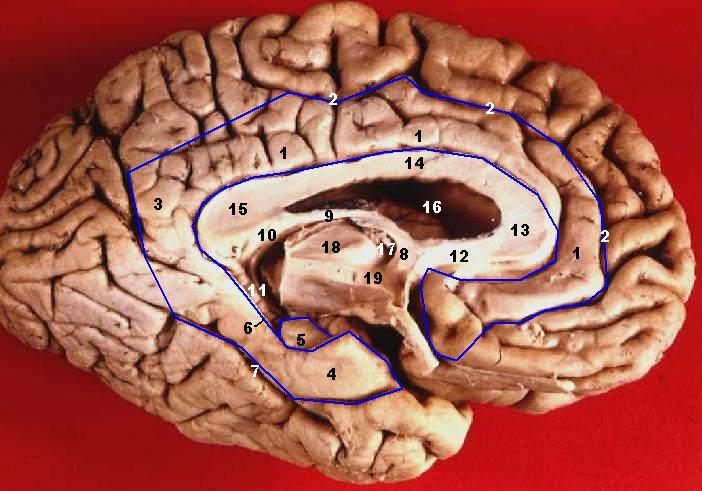
- Human brain inferior-medial view (Uncus is #5)

Identifiers
- NeuroNames: 40
- TA98: A14.1.09.235
- TA2: 5516
- FMA: 74884

The uncus is an anterior extremity of the parahippocampal gyrus. It is separated from the apex of the temporal lobe by a sulcus called the rhinal sulcus. Although superficially continuous with the hippocampal gyrus, the uncus forms morphologically a part of the rhinencephalon.

An important landmark that crosses the inferior surface of the uncus is the band of Giacomini or tail of the dentate gyrus.

The term comes from the Latin word uncus, meaning hook, and it was coined by Félix Vicq-d'Azyr (1748–1794).

== Clinical significance ==
The part of the olfactory cortex that is on the temporal lobe covers the area of the uncus, which leads into the two significant clinical aspects: herniations and seizures

- Herniations of the brain can occur if increased intracranial pressure due to a tumor, hemorrhage, or edema pushes the uncus over the tentorial notch against the brainstem and related cranial nerves. This can compress the oculomotor nerve (CN III).

This causes problems associated with a non-functional or problematic CN III - the pupil on the ipsilateral side fails to constrict to light and absence of medial/superior movement of the orbit, resulting in a fixed, dilated pupil and an eye with a characteristic "down and out" position due to dominance of the abducens and trochlear nerves. Further pressure on the midbrain results in progressive lethargy, coma and death due to compression of the mesencephalic reticular activating system.

Brainstem damage is typically ipsilateral to the herniation, although the contralateral cerebral peduncle may be pushed against the tentorial notch, resulting in a characteristic indentation known as Kernohan's notch and ipsilateral hemiparesis, since fibers running in the cerebral peduncle decussate (cross over) in the lower medulla to control muscle groups on the opposite side of the body. The landmark indicates the amygdala.

- Seizures that originate in the uncus are known as uncinate fits which are characterized by hallucinations of taste or smell.

== Function ==
A sparse amount of literature exists to propose a comprehensive overview of the functionality of the uncus. A study has indicated that psychotic-like experiences were associated with reduced expansion within the uncus between the ages of 14 and 19 in cannabis-using individuals.

== Additional images ==
Position of uncus (red)

Basal view of a human brain

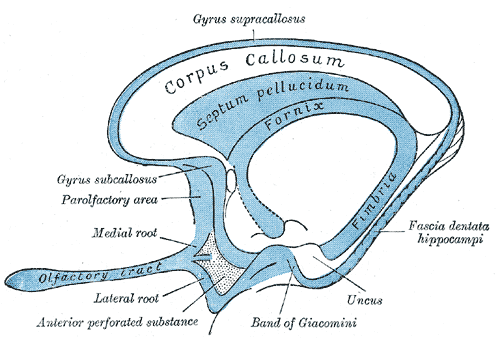
Scheme of rhinencephalon. (Uncus labeled at bottom right.)
