= List of Greek and Latin roots in English/O =

Lists of Greek and Latin roots in English beginning with other letters:
- A
- B
- C
- D
- E
- F
- G
- H
- I
- J
- K
- L
- M
- N
- O
- P
- Q
- R
- S
- T
- U
- V
- X
- Z

== O ==
Root	Meaning in English	Origin language	Etymology (root origin)	English examples
ob-, o-, oc-, of-, og-, op-, os-	against	Latin	ob	obduracy, obdurate, obduration, obfuscate, oblique, obliquity, obstinate, obstreperous, occur, offend, omit, oppose, ostensible, ostentatious
obel-	spit, nail	Greek	ὀβελός (obelós), ὀβελίσκος (obelískos)	metobelus, obelisk, obelism, obelus
obol-	nail	Greek	ὀβολός, ὀβολοῦ (obolós, oboloû)	obol, obolus
ocean-	river, stream	Greek	ὠκεανός (ōkeanós)	Oceania, oceanic
ochl-	crowd, mob	Greek	ὄχλος, ὄχλου (ókhlos, ókhlou)	enochlophobia, ochlocracy, ochlophobia
oct-	eight	Greek	ὀκτώ (oktṓ), ὀκτάς (oktás), ὀκτάκις (oktákis) "eight times"	hemi-octahedron, octad, octadic, octagon, octahedron, octameter, octode
oct-	eight	Latin	octō	octangular, octennial, octovir
octav-	eighth	Latin	octāvus	octaval
octogen-	eighty each	Latin	octogeni	octogenarian, octogenary
octogesim-	eightieth	Latin	octogesimus	octogesimal
octon-	eight each	Latin	octoni	octonary
ocul-	eye	Latin	oculus, oculare	ocular, oculus, ullage
od-	path, way	Greek	ὁδός (hodós)	anode, diode, odometer, parodos, pentode, tetrode, triode
odi-	hate	Latin	odium	odious
odont-	tooth	Greek	ὀδούς, ὀδόντος (odoús, odóntos)	anodontia, conodont, cynodont, dicynodont, dysodontiasis, macrodontia, mastodon, odontoid, odontology, odontophore, orthodontics, orthodontist, pedodontics, periodontal, smilodon, Thrinaxodon, Zanclodon
odor-	fragrant	Latin	odor	malodorous, odoriferous, odorous
odyn-	pain	Greek	ὀδύνη (odúnē)	allodynia, anodyne, glossodynia, mastodynia, pleurodynia
oec-	house	Greek	ϝοῖκος (woîkos), οἶκος (oîkos)	andromonecy, archdiocese, autoecious, autoecism, dioecious, dioecy, ecesis, ecologist, ecology, economics, economist, economize, economy, ecoregion, ecosystem, ecumenic, ecumenism, gynomonoecy, heteroecious, heteroecism, heteroecy, homoecious, monoecious, monoecy, oecology, oeconomus, oecumenic, oikology, oikophobia, palaeoecology, paleoecology, parish, paroecious, perioeci, trioecious
oed-, ed-	swell, swollen	Greek	οἶδος (oîdos), οἰδεῖν (oideîn), οἴδημα, οἴδηματος (oídēma, oídēmatos)	angioedema, edema, edematous, oedema, oedematous
oen-	wine	Greek	ϝοῖνος (woînos), οἶνος (oînos)	enology, oenochoe, oenologist, oenology, oenophile, oenophilia, oinochoe
oesophag-	gullet	Greek	οἰσοφάγος (oisophágos)	oesophagectomy, oesophagitis, oesophagus
oestr-	gadfly, sting	Greek	οἶστρος (oîstros), οἰστράω, οἴστρησις, οἴστρημα	anestrous, anestrus, anoestrus, estrogen, estrogenic, estrus, oestrone, oestrus
ogdo-	eighth	Greek	ὄγδοος (ógdoos), ὀγδοάς, ὀγδοάδος (ogdoás, ogdoádos)	ogdoad
-oid	like	Greek	-οειδής (-oeidēs)	asteroid, mucoid, organoid
ole-	oil	Latin	oleum	oleosity
olecran-	skull of elbow	Latin from Greek	ὠλέκρανον (ōlékranon)	olecranon
olig-	few	Greek	ὀλίγος (olígos)	oligarchy, Oligocene, oligopoly, oligosaccharide, oligotrophic
oliv-	olive	Latin	oliva	olivaceous, olivary, olivette
om-	raw	Greek	ὠμός (ōmós), ὠμότης (ōmótēs) "rawness"	omophagia, Omophagus
om-	shoulder	Greek	ὦμος (ômos), ὠμία (ōmía)	acromion, omohyoid, omophorion
-oma	morbid growth, tumor	Greek	-ωμα	melanoma
omas-	paunch	Latin	omasum	abomasum, omasum
ombr-	rain	Greek	ὄμβρος (ómbros)	ombrogenous, ombrology, ombrometer, Ombrophila, ombrophilous, ombrophobe, ombrotrophic
oment-	fat skin	Latin	omentum	omental
omin-	creepy	Latin	omen, ominis	abominable, ominous
ommat-	eye	Greek	ὁράω, ὦμμαι, ὄμμα, ὄμματος (ómma, ómmatos)	ommatidium, ommatophore
omni-	all	Latin	omnis	omnipotence, omnipresent, omniscient, omnivore
omphal-	navel	Greek	ὀμφαλός (omphalós)	omphalectomy, omphalic, omphalopagus, omphalophobia, paromphalocele
on-	ass	Greek	ὄνος (ónos), ὀνίσκος (onískos)	Oniscidea, Oniscomorpha
onc-	barb, hook	Greek	ὄγκος, ὄγκινος (ónkinos)	Oncinocalyx, Oncorhynchus
onc- (ΕΓΚ)	bulk	Greek	ἐνεγκεῖν, ὄγκος (ónkos), ὀγκόω, ὀγκωτός, ὄγκωσις, ὄγκωμα	oncocyte, oncocytoma, oncogenesis, oncologist, oncology
oneir-	dream	Greek	ὄνειρος (óneiros), ὀνειρώσσω, ὀνείρωξις (oneírōxis)	oneiric, oneirism, oneirocritic, Oneirocritica, Oneirodidae, oneirogen, oneirogenic, Oneiroi, oneiroid, oneirology, oneiromancy, oneironaut, oneironautics, oneirophobia, oneirophrenia, oneiroscopy
oner-	burden, load	Latin	onus, oneris	exonerate, exoneration, onerous, onus
oni-	price	Greek	ὦνος (ônos), ὤνιος (ṓnios)	oniochalasia, oniomania, oniomaniac
onomat-	name	Greek	ὄνομα, ὀνόματος (ónoma, onómatos), ὀνομάζω, ὀνομαστικός (onomastikós)	antonomasia, onomasiology, onomastic, onomasticon, onomastics, onomasty, onomatology, onomatophore, onomatopoeia
ont-	being, existence	Greek	ὄντος, ὀντότης (óntos, ontótēs), οὐσία (ousía)	dysontogenesis, homoiousia, homoousia, monoousious, ontogenesis, ontogenetic, ontogeny, ontology, ousia, parousia
onych-	claw	Greek	ὄνυξ, ὄνυχος (ónux, ónukhos), ὀνύχιον (onúkhion), ὀνύχινος, ὀνυχίζω	hapalonychia, Mesonychia, onychectomy, onycholysis, onychomancy, onychomycosis, onychophagia, onychophagy, onychorrhexis, onyx, paronychia, sardonyx
onym-	name	Greek	ὄνυμα (ónuma)	acronym, allonym, anonymous, antonym, autonym, caconym, cryptonym, eponym, eponymous, eponymy, euonym, homonym, hyperonym, hyponym, hyponymy, meronym, meronymy, metonym, metonymy, metronymic, paronym, paronymous, pseudonym, pseudonymous, synonym, synonymous, synonymy, tautonym, tautonymous, tautonymy, troponym, troponymy, xenonym, xenonymy
oo-	egg	Greek	ᾠόν (ōión)	bottarga, dioon, epoophoron, oidioid, oidium, ooblast, oocyst, oocyte, oocytogenesis, oogamete, oogamous, oogamy, oogenesis, oogonium, ooid, oolite, oolith, oology, oomancy, oophagy, oophorectomy, oophoron, ootheca, ootid, ootidogenesis, paroophoron
op-	hole	Greek	ὀπή (opḗ), ὀπαῖον (opaîon)	metope, opaion
opac-	shady	Latin	opacus	opacity, opacus, opaque
oper-	work	Latin	opus, operis	cooperate, inoperable, opera, operate, opus
oper-	cover	Latin	operire, operculum	interoperculum, kerchief, opercular, operculiform, operculum
ophi-	snake	Greek	ὄφις, ὄφεως (óphis, ópheōs)	Brachyurophis, ophicephalous, Ophicephalus, Ophiceras, Ophiclinus, ophidiophobia, ophiolite, ophiologist, ophiology, ophiophagous, Ophiophagus, ophiophagy, ophiophobia, Ophisaurus, Ophisops, ophitic
ophthalm-	eye	Greek	ὀφθαλμός (ophthalmós)	exophthalmic, exophthalmos, microphthalmia, ophthalmia, ophthalmic, ophthalmologic, ophthalmologist, ophthalmology, ophthalmoparesis, ophthalmoplegia, parophthalmia, xerophthalmia
opisth-	behind	Greek	ὄπισθεν (ópisthen), ὀπίσθιος	anopisthograph, opisthion, opisthobranch, opisthodomos, opisthoglyphous, opisthognathous, opisthograph, opisthokont, opisthosoma, opsimath, opsimathy
ops-, opt- (ΟΠ)	eye	Greek	ὄψεσθαι (ópsesthai), ὀπτός (optós), ὀπτικός (optikós), ὄψις (ópsis)	amblyopia, anopia, autopsy, biopsy, catadioptrics, catoptrics, catoptromancy, catoptrophobia, cyclops, diopter, dioptre, dioptrics, diplopia, eisoptrophobia, emmetropia, hemianopsia, myopia, opsoclonus, optic, optokinetic, panopticon, pleoptics, synopsis, synoptic, tritanopia
opsi-	late	Greek	ὀψέ (opsé), ὄψιος	opsimath
opson-	cook, prepare for eating	Greek	ὀψωνεῖν (opsōneîn), (opsōnia)	opsonin, opsonoid
opt-	choose	Latin	optare	adopt, adoptee, adoption, adoptive, co-option, coopt, cooptation, nonoptional, opt, optation, optative, option, optional, optionality
optim-	best	Latin	optimus	optimal, optimum
or-, oro-	mountain	Greek	ὄρος, ὄρεος (óros, óreos), ὀρειάς	Oread, orogenesis, orogenic, orogeny, orographic, orography, oronym
or-	mouth	Latin	os (genitive oris) "mouth"	adosculation, inosculate, inosculation, interosculate, intraoral, oral, orifice, osculant, osculum, peroral
ora-	pray, plead	Latin	orare "to pray, plead"	adore, adoration, exorable, inexorable, oracle, orate, oration, orator, oratorio, oratory, orison, perorate, peroration, perorator
orb-	circle	Latin	orbis	orbit
orch-	testicle	Greek	ὄρχις (órkhis), ὀρχίδιον (orkhídion)	anorchia, cryptorchidism, monorchism, orchid, orchiectomy, orchiopexy, Orchis, polyorchidism
orches-	dance	Greek	ὀρχεῖσθαι (orkheîsthai)	orchestra
ordin-	order	Latin	ōrdō, ordinis	coordinal, coordinate, coordination, coordinator, disorder, extraordinaire, extraordinary, grandorder, incoordinate, incoordination, infraorder, inordinate, inordination, insubordinate, insubordination, magnorder, mirorder, ordain, ordainment, order, ordinal, ordinance, ordinand, ordinariate, ordinary, ordinate, ordination, ordinative, ordnance, ornery, parvorder, preordain, preorder, preordination, quasiorder, reordain, reorder, reordination, suborder, subordinary, subordinate, subordination, superordain, superorder, superordinate, superordination
oreg-	reach	Greek	ὀρέγειν (orégein), ὀρεκτός (orektós), ὀρεκτικός (orektikós), ὄρεξις (órexis), ὄρεγμα (óregma)	anorectic, anorexia, dysorexia, orectic, orexin, parorexia
org-	work	Greek	ὄργια (órgia)	orgasm
organ-	organ, instrument, tool	Greek	ὄργανον (órganon)	organic, organism, organogenesis
ori-, ort-	rise	Latin	oriri, ortus	aboriginal, abort, abortifacient, abortion, abortive, disorient, disorientation, orient, oriental, Orientalia, orientate, orientation, orientational, orientative, origin, original, originality, originate, origination, originator, reorient, reorientation
orn-	decorate	Latin	ōrnāre	adorn, adornment, ornament, ornamental, ornamentation, ornate, ornative, ornature, suborn, subornation
ornith-	bird	Greek	ὄρνις, ὄρνιθος (órnis, órnithos)	Avernus, ornithology, ornithomancy, ornithorhynchus, ornithosis
orphan-		Greek	ὀρφανός (orphanós), ὀρφανότης	orphan
orth-	straight	Greek	ὀρθός (orthós), ὀρθότης	orthocenter, orthocentric, orthodontia, orthodontic, orthodontist, orthodox, orthodoxy, orthographic, ortholog, orthologous, orthonym, orthopedic, orthoscope, orthosis, orthostat, orthostyle, orthotic
oryz-	rice	Greek	ὄρυζα (óruza), ὀρύζιον	Oryza, Oryzomys, rice, risotto
oscill-	swing	Latin	oscillum	oscillate, oscillation, oscillator, oscillatory
osm-	odor	Greek	ὀσμή (osmḗ), ὄσμησις	anosmia, anosmic, cacosmia, coprosmia, dysosmia, dysosmic, euosmia, hyperosmia, hyperosmic, hyposmia, hyposmic, osmium, osmolagnia, osmophobia, osphresiolagnia, parosmia, phantosmia, troposmia
osm-	push, thrust	Greek	ὠσμός (ōsmós)	osmometry, osmosis, osmostat, osmotic
oss-	bone	Latin	os, ossis	exossation, interosseous, ossature, osselet, osseocartilaginous, osseointegration, osseous, ossicle, ossicular, ossiferous, ossification, ossifrage, ossify, ossuary
oste-	bone	Greek	ὀστέον, ὀστέου (ostéon, ostéou), ὀστοῦν, ὀστοῦ (ostoûn, ostoû)	dysostosis, endosteum, exostosis, hyperostosis, monostotic, Osteichthyes, osteoarthritis, osteoblast, osteochondritis, osteochondrosis, osteoclast, osteogenic, osteogenesis, osteoid, osteology, osteolysis, osteoma, osteomalacia, osteonecrosis, osteopathy, osteopenia, osteoporosis, osteosarcoma, osteosis, osteothrombosis, osteotome, osteotomy, periosteum, synostosis
osti-	entrance	Latin	ostium	ostiary, ostiolar, ostiole, ostium
ostrac-	shell	Greek	ὄστρειον (óstreion), ὀστρακίζω (ostrakízō), ὄστρακον (óstrakon)	Entomostraca, Leptostraca, Malacostraca, ostracism, ostracize, ostracod, ostracoderm, ostracon, periostracum
ostre-	oyster	Greek	ὄστρεον	ostreophagist, oyster
ot-	ear	Greek	οὖς, ὠτός (oûs, ōtós)	anotia, Aotus, microtia, Myosotis, otalgia, otic, otitis, otocephaly, otocleisis, otoconium, otocyst, otodynia, otolith, otology, otopathy, otophyma, otoplasty, otorhinology, otorrhea, otosclerosis, otoscope, otoscopy, ototomy, parotic, parotid, periotic, synotia
ov-	egg	Latin	ovum	obovate, oval, ovarian, ovariole, ovary, ovate, ovicapsule, ovicidal, ovicide, oviduct, oviferous, oviform, oviposition, ovipositor, ovolo, ovular, ovulation, ovulatory, ovule, ovum, pluriovulate
ovi-	sheep	Latin	ovis	ovile, ovine
oxy-	sharp, pointed	Greek	ὀξύς (oxús)	anoxia, anoxic, dioxide, hypoxia, monoxide, oxide, oxyanion, oxygen, oxyhalide, oxymoron, oxyntic, oxytone, paroxysm, pentoxide, polyoxide, tetraoxygen, tetroxide, trioxide
oz-	smell	Greek	ὄζειν (ózein), ὄζων (ózōn), ὄζη	ozocerite, ozone, ozopore
