= Symptoms of COVID-19 =

Symptoms of COVID-19

The symptoms of COVID-19 are variable depending on the type of variant contracted, ranging from mild symptoms to a potentially fatal illness. Common symptoms include coughing, fever, loss of smell and taste, with less common ones including headaches, nasal congestion and runny nose, muscle pain, sore throat, diarrhea, eye irritation, and toes swelling or turning purple, and in moderate to severe cases, breathing difficulties. People with the COVID-19 infection may have different symptoms, and their symptoms may change over time.

Three common clusters of symptoms have been identified: a respiratory symptom cluster with cough, sputum, shortness of breath, and fever; a musculoskeletal symptom cluster with muscle and joint pain, headache, and fatigue; and a cluster of digestive symptoms with abdominal pain, vomiting, and diarrhea. In people without prior ear, nose, or throat disorders, loss of taste combined with loss of smell is associated with COVID-19 and is reported in as many as 88% of symptomatic cases.

Of those who show symptoms, 81% develop only mild to moderate symptoms (up to mild pneumonia), while 14% develop severe symptoms (dyspnea, hypoxia, or more than 50% lung involvement on imaging) that require hospitalization, and 5% of patients develop critical symptoms (respiratory failure, septic shock, or multiorgan dysfunction) requiring ICU admission. As of 2024–2025, the majority of infections are characterized as mild or asymptomatic; however, risk remains stratified by age and underlying health conditions, with severe outcomes—including respiratory failure and multi-organ dysfunction—occurring in a significantly smaller percentage of the general vaccinated population than in early 2020.

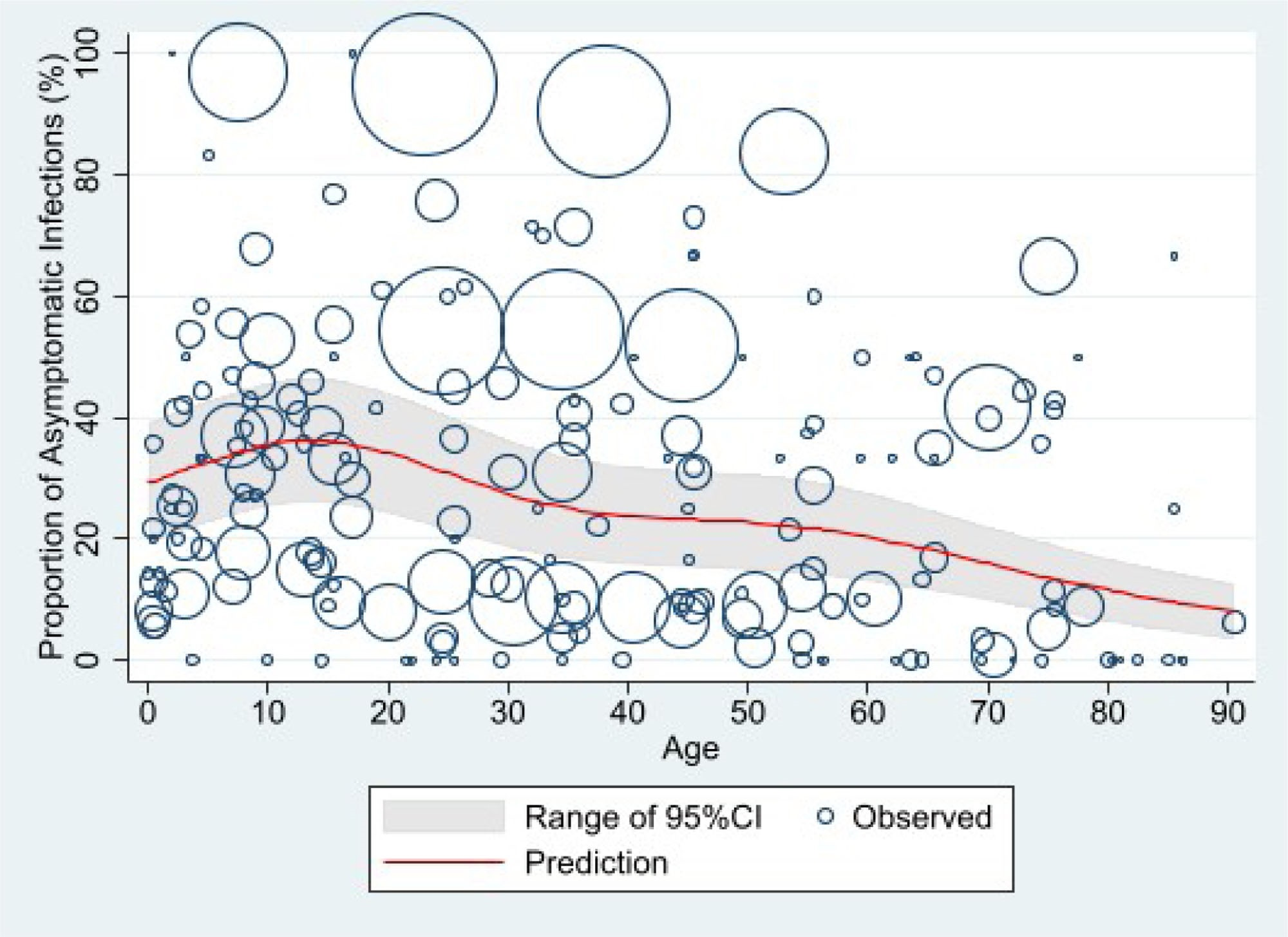
Proportion of asymptomatic SARS-CoV-2 infection by age. About 44% of those infected with SARS-CoV-2 remained asymptomatic throughout the infection.

At least a third of the people who are infected with the virus do not develop noticeable symptoms at any point in time. These asymptomatic carriers tend not to get tested and can still spread the disease. Other infected people will develop symptoms later (called "pre-symptomatic") or have very mild symptoms and can also spread the virus.

As is common with infections, there is a delay, or incubation period, between the moment a person first becomes infected and the appearance of the first symptoms. The median delay for COVID-19 is four to five days possibly being infectious on 1–4 of those days. Most symptomatic people experience symptoms within two to seven days after exposure, and almost all will experience at least one symptom within 12 days.

Most people recover from the acute phase of the disease. However, some people continue to experience a range of effects, such as fatigue, for prolonged periods after an initial COVID-19 infection. This is the result of a condition called long COVID, which can be described as a range of persistent symptoms that continue for months or years. Long-term damage to organs has been observed after the onset of COVID-19. Multi-year studies are underway to further investigate the protracted effects of long COVID. Reducing the risk of long COVID includes staying up to date on the most recent COVID-19 vaccine, practicing good hygiene, maintaining clean indoor air, and physical distancing from people infected with a respiratory virus.

The Omicron variant became dominant in the U.S. in December 2021. Symptoms with the Omicron variant are less severe than they are with other variants.

== Overview ==
Symptoms of COVID-19

Some less common symptoms of COVID-19 can be relatively non-specific; however the most common symptoms are fever, dry cough, and loss of taste and smell. Among those who develop symptoms, approximately one in five may become more seriously ill and have difficulty in breathing. Emergency symptoms include difficulty in breathing, persistent chest pain or pressure, sudden confusion, loss of mobility and speech, and bluish face or lips; immediate medical attention is advised if these symptoms are present. Further development of the disease can lead to complications including pneumonia, acute respiratory distress syndrome, sepsis, septic shock, and kidney failure.

Some symptoms usually appear sooner than others, with deterioration usually developing in the second week. In August 2020, scientists at the University of Southern California reported the "likely" order of initial symptoms of the COVID-19 disease as a fever followed by a cough, then sore throat, muscle pain, or headache, followed by nausea, vomiting, and diarrhea. This contrasts with the most common path for influenza where it is common to develop a cough first and fever later. Impaired immunity in part drive disease progression after SARS-CoV-2 infection. While health agency guidelines tend to recommend isolating for 14 days while watching for symptoms to develop, there is limited evidence that symptoms may develop for some patients more than 14 days after initial exposure.

== Symptom profile of variants ==
The frequency of symptoms predominating for people with different variants may differ from what was observed in the earlier phases of the pandemic.

=== Delta ===
Infection with the Delta variant causes flu-like symptoms. Common symptoms include fever, coughing, headache, shortness of breath, muscle pain, and weakness. Most people also experience numbness or loss of one's senses of smell and taste. In severe cases, symptoms include difficulty breathing, low oxygen levels in blood, acute respiratory distress syndrome, septic shock, increased blood acidity, coagulation dysfunction, and failure of multiple organs.

=== Omicron ===
British epidemiologist Tim Spector said in mid-December 2021 that the majority of symptoms of the Omicron variant were the same as a common cold, including headaches, sore throat, runny nose, fatigue and sneezing, so that people with cold symptoms should take a test. "Things like fever, cough and loss of smell are now in the minority of symptoms we are seeing. Most people don't have classic symptoms." People with cold symptoms in London (where Covid was spreading rapidly) are "far more likely" to have Covid than a cold.

A unique reported symptom of the Omicron variant is night sweats, particularly with the BA.5 subvariant. Also, loss of taste and smell seem to be uncommon compared to other strains.

== Systemic ==
Typical systemic symptoms include fatigue, and muscle and joint pains. Some people have a sore throat.Hoarseness and a dry or irritated throat have also been reported as symptoms, especially for patients infected with the XFG strain.

=== Fever ===
Fever is one of the most common symptoms in COVID-19 patients. However, the absence of the symptom itself at an initial screening does not rule out COVID-19. Fever in the first week of a COVID-19 infection is part of the body's natural immune response; however in severe cases, if the infections develop into a cytokine storm the fever is counterproductive. As of September 2020, little research had focused on relating fever intensity to outcomes.

A June 2020 systematic review reported a 75–81% prevalence of fever. As of July 2020, the European Centre for Disease Prevention and Control (ECDC) reported a prevalence rate of ~45% for fever.

=== Pain ===
A June 2020 systematic review reported a 27–35% prevalence of fatigue, 14–19% for muscle pain, 10–14% for sore throat. As of July 2020, the ECDC reported a prevalence rate of ~63% for muscle weakness (asthenia), ~63% for muscle pain (myalgia), and ~53% for sore throat.

== Respiratory ==
Coughing is another typical symptom of COVID-19, which could be either dry or a productive cough.

Some symptoms, such as difficulty breathing, are more common in patients who need hospital care. Shortness of breath tends to develop later in the illness. Persistent anosmia or hyposmia or ageusia or dysgeusia has been documented in 20% of cases for longer than 30 days.

Respiratory complications may include pneumonia and acute respiratory distress syndrome (ARDS).

As of July 2020, the ECDC reported a prevalence rate of ~68% for nasal obstruction, ~63% for cough, ~60% for rhinorrhoea or runny nose.A June 2020 systematic review reported a 54–61% prevalence of dry cough and 22–28% for productive cough.

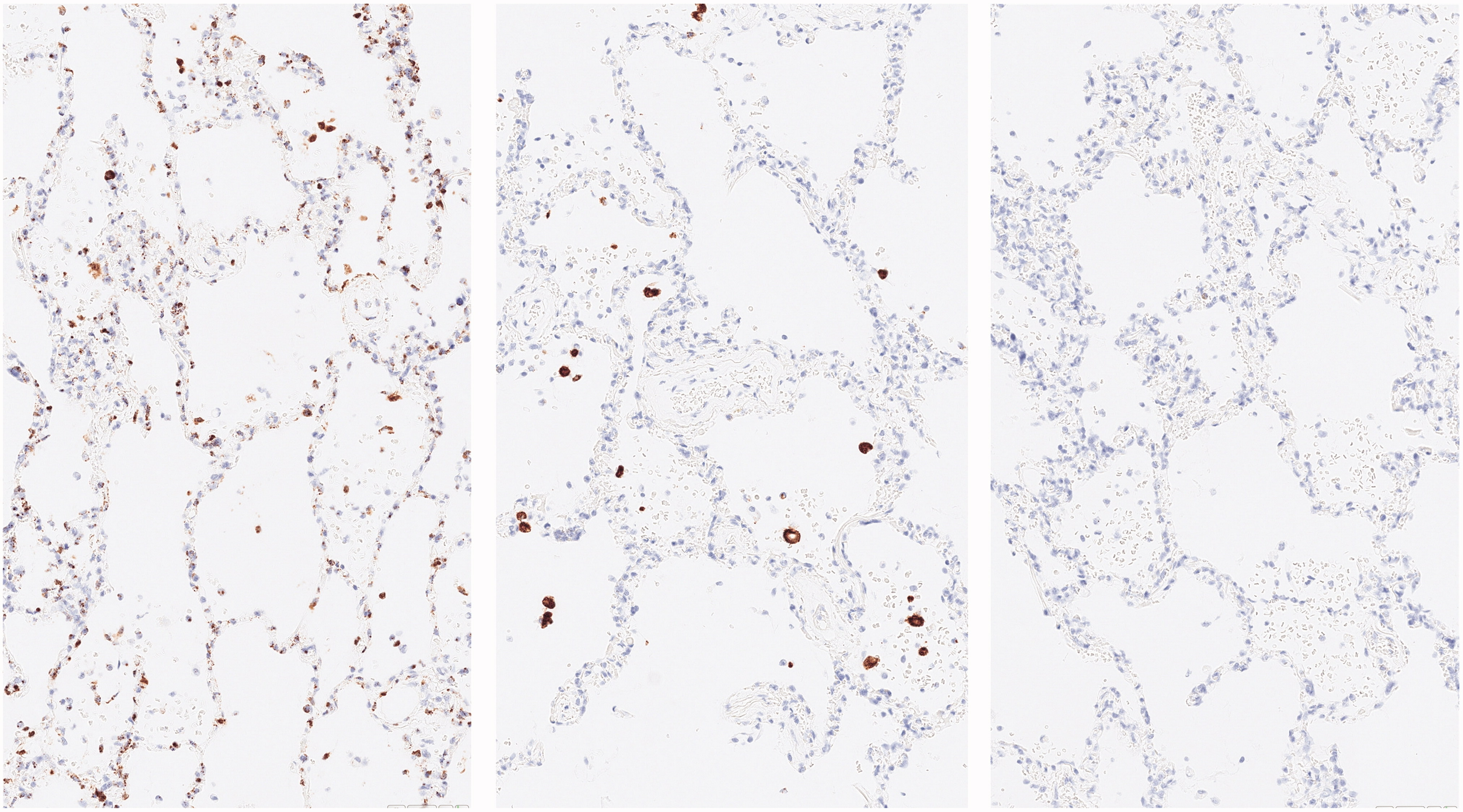
Presence of Sars-CoV-2 virus RNA in the lung. COVID-19 lung showed virus replication in the desquamated lung epithelial cells. Ubiquitin C positive control (Left), COVSPIKE (middle), and dap B negative control (right).

== Cardiovascular ==
Coagulopathy is established to be associated with COVID-19 in those patients in critical state. Thromboembolic events, such as blood clots show with high risk in COVID-19 patients in some studies.

Other cardiovascular complications may include heart failure, arrhythmias, and heart inflammation. They are common traits in severe COVID-19 patients due to the relation with the respiratory system.

Hypertension seems to be the most prevalent risk factor for myocardial injury in COVID-19 disease. It was reported in 58% of individuals with cardiac injury in a recent meta-analysis.

Several cases of acute myocarditis associated with COVID-19 have been described around the globe and are diagnosed in multiple ways. Taking into consideration serology, leukocytosis with neutrophilia and lymphopenia was found in many patients. Cardiac biomarkers troponin and N-terminal (NT)-prohormone BNP (NT-proBNP) were seen elevated. Similarly, the level of inflammation-related markers such as C-reactive protein (CRP), D-dimer, IL-6, procalcitonin was significantly increased, indicating an inflammatory process in the body. Electrocardiogram findings were variable and ranged from sinus tachycardia, ST-segment elevation, T-wave inversion and ST-depression. In one case, viral particles were seen in the interstitial cell, and another case reported SARS-CoV-2 RT–PCR positivity in the cardiac tissue suggestive of direct viral injury to the myocardium. Endomyocardial biopsy [EMB] remains the gold standard invasive technique in diagnosing myocarditis; however, due to the increased risk of infection, it is not done in COVID-19 patients.

The binding of the SARS-CoV-2 virus through ACE2 receptors present in heart tissue may be responsible for direct viral injury leading to myocarditis. In a study done during the SARS outbreak, SARS virus RNA was ascertained in the autopsy of heart specimens in 35% of the patients who died due to SARS. It was also observed that an already diseased heart has increased expression of ACE2 receptor contrasted to healthy individuals. Hyperactive immune responses in COVID-19 Patients may lead to the initiation of the cytokine storm. This excess release of cytokines may lead to myocardial injury.

== Neurological ==
Patients with COVID-19 can present with neurological symptoms that can be broadly divided into central nervous system involvement, such as headache, dizziness, altered mental state, and disorientation, and peripheral nervous system involvement, such as anosmia and dysgeusia. As was noted, COVID-19 has also been linked to various neurological symptoms at the diagnosis or throughout the disease, with over 90% of individuals with COVID-19 having reported at least one subjective neurological symptom. Some patients experience cognitive dysfunction called "COVID fog", or "COVID brain fog", involving memory loss, inattention, poor concentration or disorientation. Other neurologic manifestations include seizures, strokes, encephalitis, and Guillain–Barré syndrome (which includes loss of motor functions).

As of July 2020, the ECDC reported a prevalence rate of ~70% for headache. A June 2020 systematic review reported a 10–16% prevalence of headache. However, headache could be mistaken for having a random relationship with COVID-19; there is unambiguous evidence that COVID-19 patients who had never had a recurrent headache suddenly get a severe headache daily because of SARS-CoV-2 infection.

=== Loss of smell ===
In about 60% of COVID-19 patients, chemosensory deficits are reported, including losing their sense of smell, either partially or fully.

This symptom, if it is present at all, often appears early in the illness. Its onset is often reported to be sudden. Smell usually returns to normal within a month. However, for some patients it improves very slowly and is associated with odors being perceived as unpleasant or different from how they originally were (parosmia), and for some people smell does not return for at least many months. It is an unusual symptom for other respiratory diseases, so it is used for symptom-based screening.

Loss of smell has several consequences. Loss of smell increases foodborne illness due to inability to detect spoiled food, and may increase fire hazards due to inability to detect smoke. It has also been linked to depression. If smell does not return, smell training is a potential option.

It is sometimes the only symptom to be reported, implying that it has a neurological basis separate from nasal congestion. As of January 2021, it is believed that these symptoms are caused by infection of sustentacular cells that support and provide nutrients to sensory neurons in the nose, rather than infection of the neurons themselves. Sustentacular cells have many Angiotensin-converting enzyme 2 (ACE2) receptors on their surfaces, while olfactory sensory neurons do not. Loss of smell may also be the result of inflammation in the olfactory bulb.

A June 2020 systematic review found a 29–54% prevalence of olfactory dysfunction for people with COVID-19, while an August 2020 study using a smell-identification test reported that 96% of people with COVID-19 had some olfactory dysfunction, and 18% had total smell loss. Another June 2020 systematic review reported a 4–55% prevalence of hyposmia. As of July 2020, the ECDC reported a prevalence rate of ~70% for loss of smell.

A disturbance in smell or taste is more commonly found in younger people, and perhaps because of this, it is correlated with a lower risk of medical complications.

=== Loss of taste and chemesthesis ===
In some people, COVID-19 causes people to temporarily experience changes in how food tastes (dysgeusia or ageusia). Changes to chemesthesis, which includes chemically triggered sensations such as spiciness, are also reported. As of January 2021, the mechanism for taste and chemesthesis symptoms were not well understood.

A June 2020 systematic review found a 24–54% prevalence of gustatory dysfunction for people with COVID-19. Another June 2020 systematic review reported a 1–8% prevalence of hypogeusia. As of July 2020, the ECDC reported a prevalence rate of ~54% for gustatory dysfunction.

=== Other neurological and psychiatric symptoms ===
Other neurological symptoms appear to be rare, but may affect half of patients who are hospitalized with severe COVID-19. Some reported symptoms include delirium, stroke, brain hemorrhage, memory loss, psychosis, peripheral nerve damage, anxiety, and post-traumatic stress disorder. Neurological symptoms in many cases are correlated with damage to the brain's blood supply or encephalitis, which can progress in some cases to acute disseminated encephalomyelitis. Strokes have been reported in younger people without conventional risk factors.

As of September 2020, it was unclear whether these symptoms were due to direct infection of brain cells, or of overstimulation of the immune system.

A June 2020 systematic review reported a 6–16% prevalence of vertigo or dizziness, 7–15% for confusion, and 0–2% for ataxia.

== Blood clots and bleeding ==
Patients are at increased risk of a range of different blood clots, some potentially fatal, for months following COVID infection. The Guardian wrote, "Overall, they [a Swedish medical team] identified a 33-fold increase in the risk of pulmonary embolism, a fivefold increase in the risk of DVT (deep vein thrombosis) and an almost twofold increase in the risk of bleeding in the 30 days after infection. People remained at increased risk of pulmonary embolism for six months after becoming infected, and for two and three months for bleeding and DVT. Although the risks were highest in patients with more severe illness, even those with mild Covid had a threefold increased risk of DVT and a sevenfold increased risk of pulmonary embolism. No increased risk of bleeding was found in those who experienced mild infections." Anne-Marie Fors Connolly at Umeå University said, "If you suddenly find yourself short of breath, and it doesn't pass, [and] you've been infected with the coronavirus, then it might be an idea to seek help, because we find this increased risk for up to six months."

== Other ==
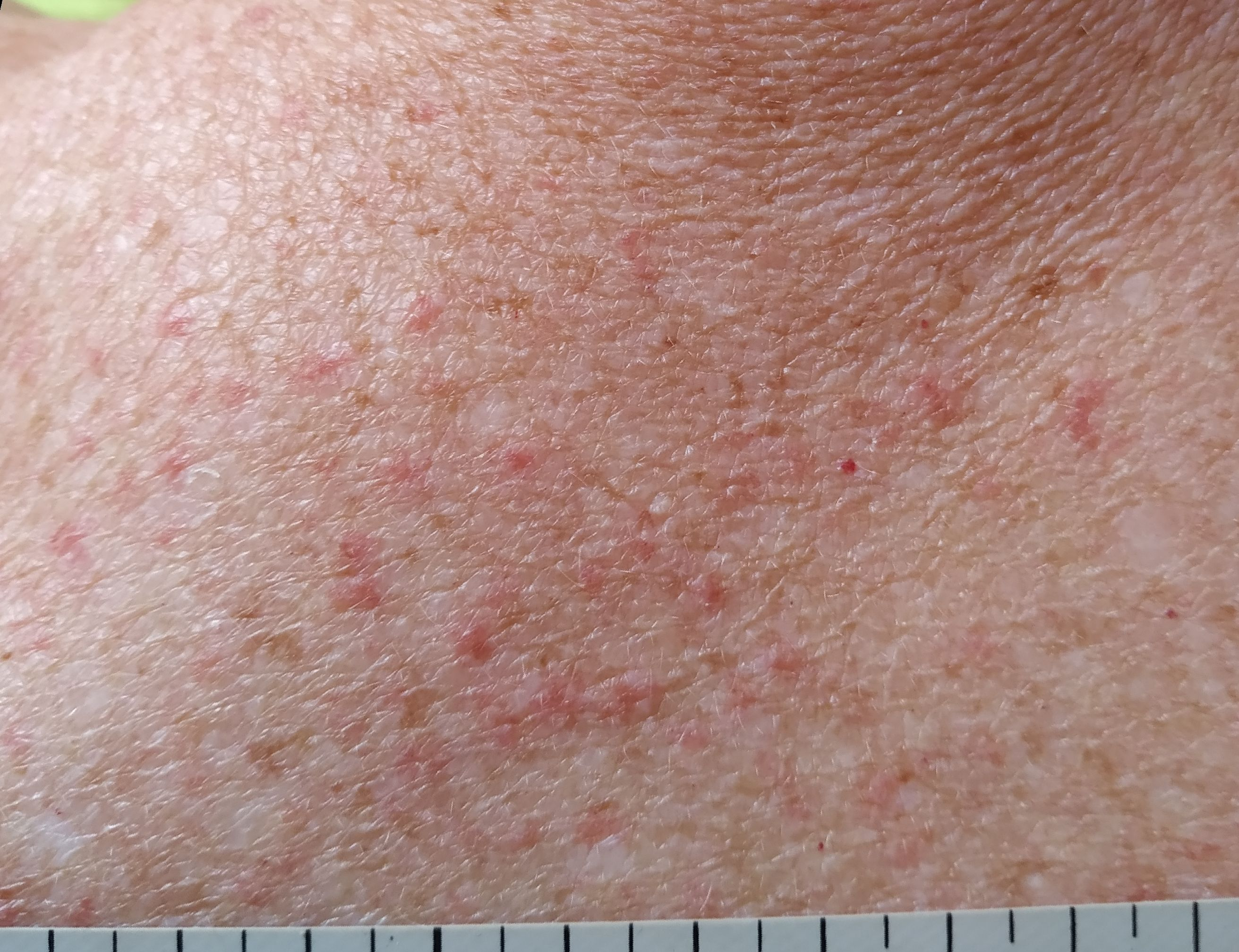
Itchy rash in COVID. 61-year-old woman. Small erythematous spots are observed.

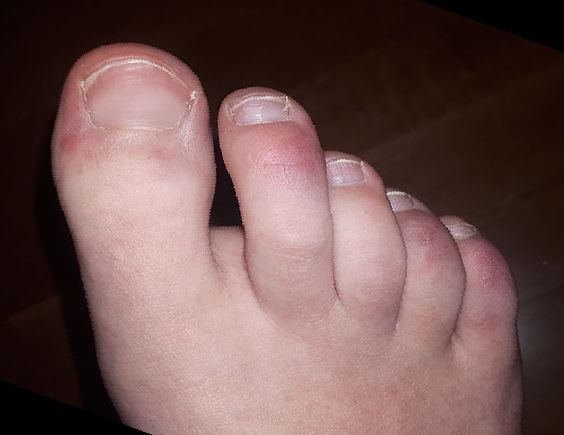
Chilblain-like lesions in a patient with coronavirus infection.

Other symptoms are less common among people with COVID-19. Some people experience gastrointestinal symptoms such as loss of appetite, diarrhea, nausea or vomiting. A June 2020 systematic review reported a 8–12% prevalence of diarrhea, and 3–10% for nausea.

Less common symptoms include chills, coughing out blood, diarrhea, and rash. The so-called "COVID toes" are pink to violaceous papules arising on the hands and feet. These chilblain-like lesions often occur only in younger patients and do not appear until late in the disease or during convalescence. Certain genetic polymorphisms (in the TREX1 gene) have been linked to susceptibility towards developing COVID-toe. A June 2020 systematic review reported a 0–1% prevalence of rash in COVID-19 patients.

Approximately 20–30% of people who present with COVID-19 have elevated liver enzymes, reflecting liver injury.

Complications include multi-organ failure, septic shock, and death.

== Stages of COVID-19 infection ==
There are three stages, according to the way COVID-19 infection can be tackled by pharmacological agents, in which the disease can be classified. Stage I is the early infection phase during which the domination of upper respiratory tract symptoms is present. Stage II is the pulmonary phase in which the patient develops pneumonia with all its associated symptoms; this stage is split with Stage IIa which is without hypoxia and Stage IIb which includes hypoxia. Stage III is the hyperinflammation phase, the most severe phase, in which the patient develops acute respiratory distress syndrome (ARDS), sepsis and multi-organ failure.

A similar stereotyped course was postulated to be: the first phase of an incubation period, a second phase corresponding to the viral phase, a third phase corresponding to the state of inflammatory pneumonia, a fourth phase corresponding to the brutal clinical aggravation reflected by acute respiratory distress syndrome (ARDS), and finally, in survivors, a fifth phase potentially including lung fibrosis, and persisting in the form of "post-covid" symptoms.

== Longer-term effects ==
=== Multisystem inflammatory syndrome in children ===
Following the infection, children may develop multisystem inflammatory syndrome, also called paediatric multisystem inflammatory syndrome. This has symptoms similar to Kawasaki disease, which can possibly be fatal.

=== Long COVID ===
Around 10% to 30% of non-hospitalised people with COVID-19 go on to develop long COVID. For those that do need hospitalisation, the incidence of long-term effects is over 50%. Long COVID is an often severe multisystem disease with a large set of symptoms. Common symptoms are fatigue, post-exertional malaise, cognitive issues, shortness of breath and pain. There are likely various, possibly coinciding, causes. Organ damage from the acute infection can explain a part of the symptoms, but long COVID is also observed in people where organ damage seems to be absent.

By a variety of mechanisms, the lungs are the organs most affected in COVID‑19. In people requiring hospital admission, up to 98% of CT scans performed show lung abnormalities after 28 days of illness even if they had clinically improved. People with advanced age, severe disease, prolonged ICU stays, or who smoke are more likely to have long-lasting effects, including pulmonary fibrosis. Overall, approximately one-third of those investigated after four weeks will have findings of pulmonary fibrosis or reduced lung function as measured by DLCO, even in asymptomatic people, but with the suggestion of continuing improvement with the passing of more time. After severe disease, lung function can take anywhere from three months to a year or more to return to previous levels.

The risks of cognitive deficit, dementia, psychotic disorders, and epilepsy or seizures persists at an increased level two years after infection.

=== Symptoms ===
Long COVID can attack a multitude of organs such as the lungs, heart, blood vessels, kidneys, gut, and brain. Some common symptoms that occur as a result are fatigue, cough, shortness of breath, chest pains, brain fog, gastrointestinal issues, insomnia, anxiety/depression, and delirium. A difference between acute COVID-19 and PCC is the effect that it has on a person's mind. People are found to be dealing with brain fog and impaired memory, and diminished learning ability which has a large impact on their everyday lives. A study that took a deeper look into these specific symptoms took 50 SARS-CoV-2 laboratory-positive patients and 50 SARS-CoV-2 laboratory-negative patients to analyze the variety of neurologic symptoms present during long COVID. The most frequent symptoms included brain fog, headache, numbness, dysgeusia (loss of taste), anosmia (loss of smell), and myalgias (muscle pains) with an overall decrease in quality of life.
