= Normosmia =

Normal olfactory function

Normosmia is the normal sensitivity of stimulus within the olfactory system. It contrasts with the various olfactory disorders, like anosmia, hyposmia, and dysosmia.
