= Impact of COVID-19 on neurological, psychological and other mental health outcomes =

There is increasing evidence suggesting that COVID-19 causes both acute and chronic neurological or psychological symptoms. Caregivers of COVID-19 patients also show a higher than average prevalence of mental health concerns. These symptoms result from multiple different factors.

SARS-Coronavirus-2 (SARS-CoV-2) directly infects olfactory neurons (smell) and nerve cells expressing taste receptors. Although these cells communicate directly with the brain, the virus does not exhibit strong infection of other nerve cells in the central nervous system. Many of the neurological sequelae appear to result from damage to the vascular cells of the brain or from damage resulting from hypoxia (i.e., limitations in the oxygen supply for the brain). Chronic effects of COVID-19 can lead to a prolonged inflammatory state, which can increase symptoms resembling an autoimmune disorder. Many patients with COVID-19 experience psychological symptoms that can arise either from the direct actions of the virus, the chronic increase in inflammation or secondary effects, such as post-traumatic stress disorder.

Large community-based testing has also found small but measurable average post-infection cognitive deficits, with larger effects among people who report ongoing symptoms and after more severe or earlier-variant infections.

SARS-CoV-2 can be detected in the brain and cerebrospinal fluid acutely by polymerase chain reaction, and is thought to enter via the olfactory system. Cranial nerves (including the facial nerve and vagus nerve, which mediate taste) provide an additional route of entry. SARS-CoV-2 has been detected in endothelial cells by electron microscopy, although such a method provides evidence that demonstrates the presence of the virus, but does not convey the amount of virus that is present (qualitative rather than quantitative).

== Acute neurologic symptoms ==
The fraction of subjects who experience symptoms following an infection with SARS-CoV-2 varies by age. Between 10 and 20% of patients who are infected generally exhibit the clinical syndrome, known as COVID-19. The number of COVID-19 infections are highest in subjects between ages 18–65, while the risk of severe disease or death jumps after age 50 and increases with age. About 35% of patients with symptoms of COVID-19 experience neurological complications. Neurological symptoms are not unique to COVID-19; infection with SARS-CoV-1 and MERS-CoV also give rise to acute and delayed neurological symptoms including peripheral neuropathy, myopathy, Guillain–Barré syndrome and Bickerstaff brainstem encephalitis.

Loss of the sense of taste or smell are among the earliest and most common symptoms of COVID-19. Roughly 81% of patients with clinical COVID-19 experience disorders of smell (46% anosmia, 29% hyposmia, and 6% dysosmia). Disorders of taste occur in 94% of patients (ageusia 45%, hypogeusia 23%, and dysgeusia 26%). Most patients recover their sense of taste or smell within 8 days. Delirium is also a common manifestation of the infection, particularly in the elderly. Recent evidence from a longitudinal study supports an inflammatory basis for delirium. Many patients with COVID-19 also experience more severe neurological symptoms. These symptoms include, headache, nausea, vomiting, impaired consciousness, encephalitis, myalgia and acute cerebrovascular disease including stroke, venous sinus, thrombosis and intracerebral hemorrhage.

Increasing attention has focused on cerebrovascular accidents (e.g., stroke), which are reported in up to 5% of hospitalized patients, and occur in both old and young patients. Guillain–Barré syndrome, acute myelitis and encephalomyelitis have also been reported. Guillain–Barré syndrome arises as an autoimmune disorder, that leads to progressive muscle weakness, difficulty walking and other symptoms reflecting reduced signaling to muscles. The cases of myelitis could arise from direct infection of muscle via local angiotensin-converting enzyme 2, the receptor for SARS CoV-2. COVID-19 can also cause severe disease in children. Some children with COVID-19 who develop Kawasaki disease, which is a multi-system inflammatory syndrome that also cerebrovascular disease and neurologic involvement.

=== Disorders of smell (olfaction) and taste (gustation) ===
As mentioned above, many COVID-19 patients suffer from disorders of taste or smell. 41% to 62% of patients (depending on the particular study) have disorders of the sense of smell (olfaction), which can present as anosmia (loss of olfaction), hyposmia (reduced olfaction) or parosmia (distortion of olfaction). However, loss of olfaction is not unique to COVID-19; approximately 13% of patients with influenza also lose olfaction, as do patients with MERS-CoV and Ebola virus. Among the patients with COVID-19, 50% of patients recover olfaction within 14 days, and 89% of patients have complete resolution of their loss of olfaction within 4 weeks. Only 5% of COVID-19 patients experience a loss of olfaction lasting more than 40 days.

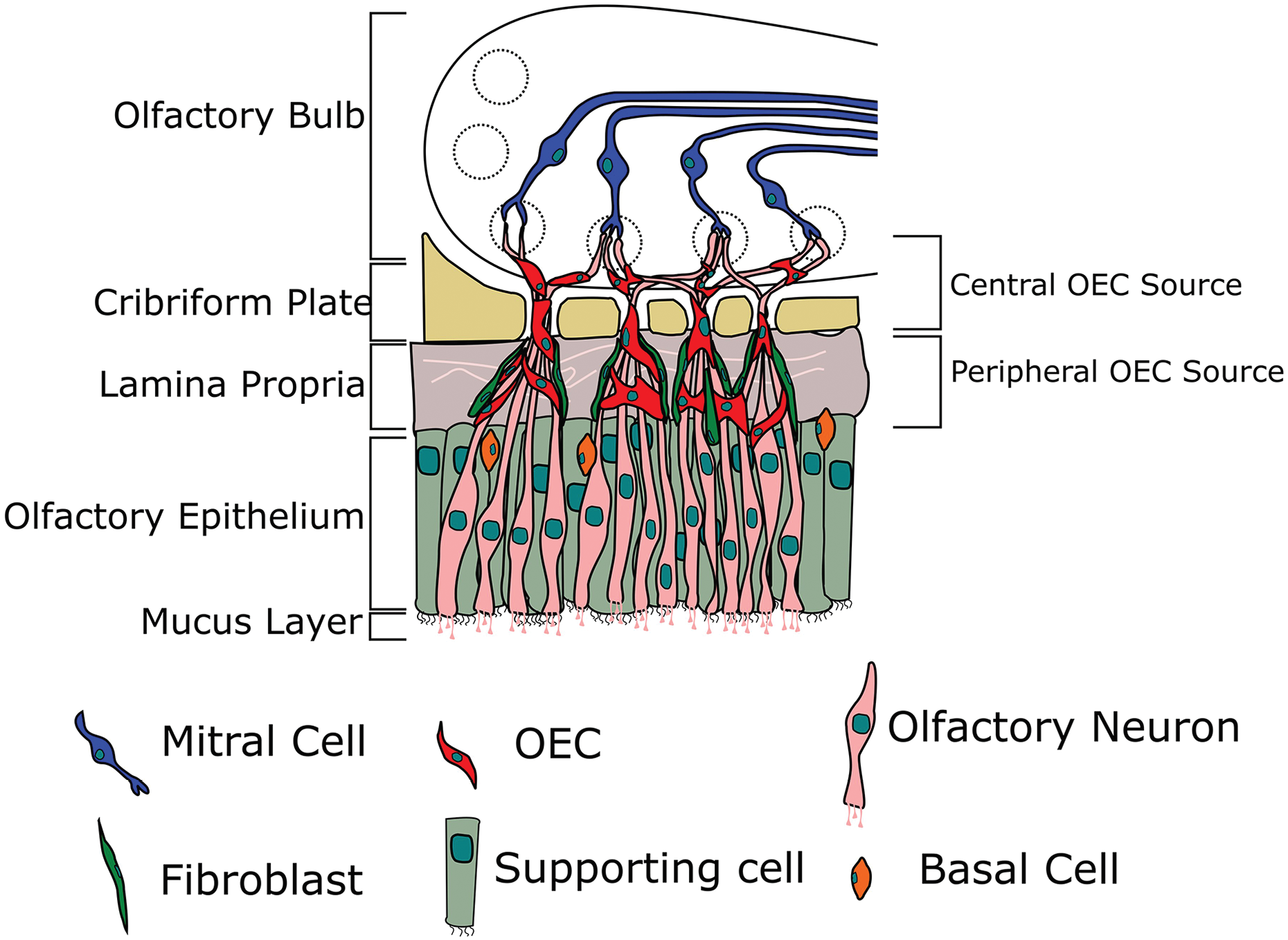
Structure of the olfactory epithelium. SARS-CoV-2 infects the support cells (sustentacular cells), which injures the olfactory neurons in the olfactory epithelium leading to loss of smell. New olfactory neurons regenerate from the basal cells.

The SARS-CoV-2 virus appears to attack the olfactory epithelium (sustentacullar or "support" cells), which are the cells that surround and support olfactory receptor neurons. Little if any virus directly infects these neurons themselves. However, SARS-CoV-2 infection of the sustentacullar cells can lead to desquamation (shedding) of the olfactory epithelium, with collateral loss of olfactory receptor neurons and anosmia. However, the olfactory epithelium is continually regenerated, and neurons that are damaged are typically replaced in about 14 days. The nerve cells controlling taste, termed the gustatory nerve cells, turn over even faster, being renewed in about 10 days.

Clinical help exists for patients experiencing disorders of olfaction. Patients who experience of loss of smell for longer than two weeks are recommended to obtain olfactory training. Olfactory training helps to "teach" the new olfactory neurons how to link with the brain so that odors can be noticed and then recognized. Personal accounts of the process of olfactory training post COVID-19 infection have been covered in media outlets such as the New York Times. Patients experiencing loss of smell for more than 2 weeks are also recommended to obtain a referral to an ear nose and throat (ENT) physician. Oral corticosteroid therapy can help, but is optional. alpha-lipoic acid is another remedy that has been proposed, but the accumulated literature on this suggests that it does not improve symptoms or recovery.

== Chronic neurologic symptoms ==
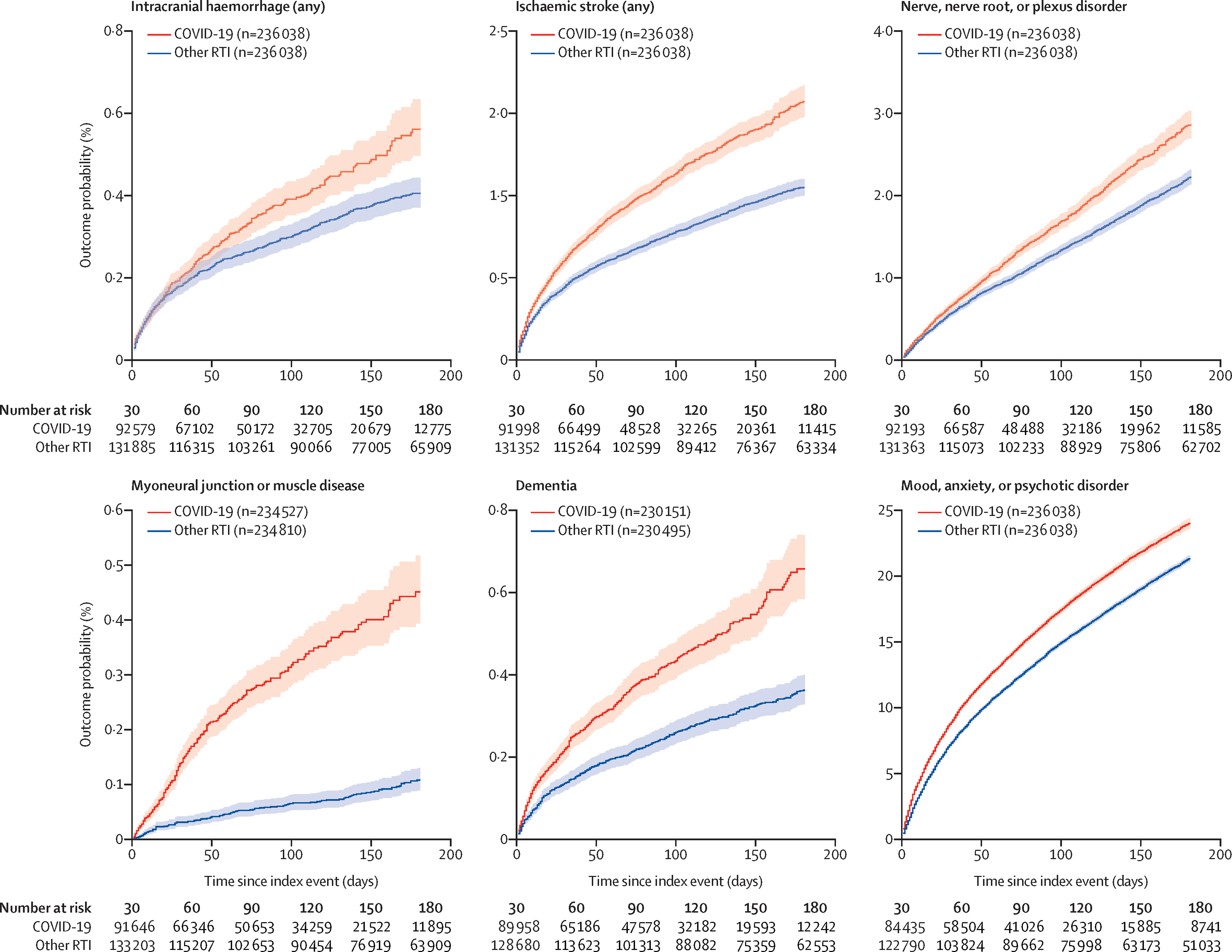
Impact of COVID-19 on neurological and psychiatric outcomes in the subsequent 6 months compared with other respiratory tract infections

Estimates of the incidence and prevalence of long COVID vary widely. The estimates depend on the definition of long COVID, the population studied, as well as a number of other methodological differences, such as whether a comparable cohort of individuals without COVID‑19 were included, what kinds of symptoms are considered representative of long COVID, and whether long COVID is assessed through a review of symptoms, through self-report of long COVID status, or some other method.

In general, estimates of long COVID incidence based on statistically random sampling of the population are much lower than those based on certified infection, which has a tendency to skew towards more serious cases (including over-representation of hospitalised patients). Further, since incidence appears to be correlated with severity of infection, it is lower in vaccinated groups, on reinfection and during the omicron era, meaning that the time when data was recorded is important. For example, the UK's Office for National Statistics reported in February 2023 (based on random sampling) that "2.4% of adults and 0.6% of children and young people reported long COVID following a second COVID‑19 infection". However, a prospective study by Statistics Canada identified a cumulative incidence of 15% after a first infection, 27% after two infections, and 38% after 3 infections.

An August 2024 review found that the prevalence of long COVID is estimated to be about 6–7% in adults, and about 1% in children. By the end of 2023, roughly 400 million people had or have had long COVID. This may be a conservative estimate, as it is based on studies counting those with specific long COVID symptoms only, and not counting those who developed long COVID after an asymptomatic infection. While hospitalised people have higher risks of getting long COVID, most long-haulers had a mild infection and were able to recover from the acute infection at home.

Two meta-analyses estimated the incidence of long COVID after infection at 43% and 58%. These estimates are controversial, as the primary studies they assessed had sampling and other biases. Furthermore, none of the definitions of long COVID have a minimum severity, so these numbers also include people with a single symptom that does not really affect them much.

In the United States in June 2023, 6% of the population indicated having long COVID, as defined as symptoms that last for 3 months or more. This percentage had stayed stable since January that year, but was a decrease compared to June 2022. Of people who had had a prior COVID infection, 11% indicated having long COVID. A quarter of those reported significant limitation in activity. A study by the Medical Expenditure Panel Survey estimated that nearly 18 million people — had suffered from long COVID as of 2023, building on a study sponsored by the Agency for Healthcare Research and Quality.

In a large population cohort study in Scotland, 42% of respondents said they had not fully recovered after 6 to 18 months after catching COVID, and 6% indicated they had not recovered at all. The risk of long COVID was associated with disease severity; people with asymptomatic infection did not have increased risk of long COVID symptoms compared to people who had never been infected. Those that had been hospitalised had 4.6 times higher odds of no recovery compared to nonhospitalised people.

Long COVID is less common in children and adolescents than in adults. Around 16% of children and adolescents develop long COVID following infection.

A study of 236,379 COVID-19 survivors showed that the "estimated incidence of a neurological or psychiatric diagnosis in the following 6 months" after diagnosed infection was 33.62% with 12.84% "receiving their first such diagnosis" and higher risks being associated with COVID-19 severity.

Neuroinflammation as a result of viral infection (e.g., influenza, herpes simplex, and hepatitis C) has been linked to the onset of psychiatric illness across numerous publications. Coronavirus infections are defined as neurotropic viral infections (i.e., they tend to target the nervous system) which increases the risk of neuroinflammation and the induction of immune system dysfunction. Psychotic disorders are characterized by neuroinflammation, more specifically maternal inflammation, and abnormally high mesolimbic dopamine (DA) signaling. Excess inflammation following a COVID-19 infection can alter neurotransmitter signaling which contributes to development of psychotic and mood related disorders.

A large study showed that post COVID-19, people had increased risk of several neurologic sequelae including headache, memory problems, smell problems and stroke; the risk was evident even among people whose acute disease was not severe enough to necessitate hospitalization; the risk was higher among hospitalized, and highest among those who needed ICU care during the acute phase of the infection. About 20% of COVID-19 cases that pass through the intensive care unit (ICU) have chronic neurologic symptoms (beyond loss of smell and taste). Of the patients that had an MRI, 44% had findings upon MRI, such as a FLAIR signal (fluid-attenuated inversion recovery signal), leptomeningeal spaces and stroke. Neuropathological studies of COVID-19 victims show microthrombi and cerebral infarctions. The most common observations are hypoxic damage, which is attributable to use of ventilators. However, many patients who died exhibited perivascular T cells (55%) and microglial cell activation (50%). Guillain–Barre Syndrome occurs in COVID-19 survivors at a rate of 5 per 1000 cases, which is about 500 times the normal incidence of 1 per 100,000 cases. A related type of autoimmune syndrome, termed Miller-Fisher Syndrome, also occurs.

COVID-19 patients who were hospitalized may also experience seizures. One paper suggests that seizures tend to occur in COVID-19 patients with a prior history of seizure disorder or cerebrovascular infarcts, however no reviews are yet available to provide data on the incidence relative to the general population. Acute epileptic seizures and status epilepticus tend to be the seizures reported. 57% of the cases occur among patients who had experienced respiratory or gastrointestinal symptoms. Although treatment with benzodiazepines would seem to be contraindicated because of the risk of respiratory depression, COVID-19 patients with acute epileptic seizures who are treated have a 96% favorable outcome, while patients with acute epileptic seizures who are not treated appear to have higher rates of mortality (5-39%).

A large scale study of 6,245,282 patients have revealed an increased risk of Alzheimer's disease diagnosis following COVID-19 infection. Many pathways involved in Alzheimer's disease progression are also implicated in the antiviral response to COVID-19, including the NLRP3 inflammasome, interleukin-6, and ACE-2.

== Acute psychiatric symptoms ==
Reported prevalence of mental health disorders vary depending on the study. In one review, 35% of patients had mild forms of anxiety, insomnia, and depression and 13% of patients had moderate to severe forms. Another review reports frequencies of depression and anxiety of 47% and 37%. According to a large meta-analysis, depression occurs in 23.0% (16.1 to 26.1) and anxiety in 15.9% (5.6 to 37.7). These psychological symptoms correlate with blood based biomarkers, such as C-reactive protein, which is an inflammatory protein. Psychiatric symptoms were also associated with severity of COVID-19 infection with those bedridden for an extended period of time having a higher prevalence of depressive and anxiety symptoms.

A case report of acute psychiatric disturbance noted an attempted suicide by a patient who had no prior noted psychiatric problems.

== Chronic psychiatric symptoms ==
A 2021 article published in Nature reports increased risk of depression, anxiety, sleep problems, and substance use disorders among post-acute COVID-19 patients. In 2020, a Lancet Psychiatry review reported occurrence of the following post-COVID-19 psychiatric symptoms: traumatic memories (30%), decreased memory (19%), fatigue (19%), irritability (13%), insomnia (12%) and depressed mood (11%). Other symptoms are also prevalent, but are reported in fewer articles; these symptoms include sleep disorder (100% of patients) and disorder of attention and concentration (20%). These accumulated problems lead to a general (and quantified) reduction in the quality of life and social functioning (measured with the SF-36 scale). Studies have found evidence of cultural differences in mental health outcomes during the pandemic, such as higher rates of anxiety in southern China than northern China. There is also increasing evidence to suggest that ongoing psychiatric symptoms, including post-traumatic stress and depression, may contribute to fatigue in post-COVID syndrome.

== Pediatric symptoms ==
Children also exhibit neurological or mental health symptoms associated with COVID-19, although the rate of severe disease is much lower among children than adults. Children with COVID-19 appear to exhibit similar rates as adults for loss of taste and smell. Kawasaki syndrome, a multi-system inflammatory syndrome, has received extensive attention. About 16% of children experience some type of neurological manifestation of COVID-19, such as headache or fatigue. About 1% of children have severe neurological symptoms. About 15% of children with Kawasaki syndrome exhibit severe neurological symptoms, such as encephalopathy. COVID-19 does not appear to elicit epilepsy de novo in children, but it can bring out seizures in children with prior histories of epilepsy. COVID-19 has not been associated with strokes in children. Guilliain Barre Syndrome also appears to be rare in children.

== Cognitive symptoms ==
In September 2024, a human challenge study was published; the study lasted from 6 March 2021 to 11 July 2022, with 36 people assigned to acquire a controlled dose of SARS-CoV-2. The purpose of the study was to more definitively account for confounding factors, potentially exhibited by previous observational studies, as well as self-reporting on cognition performance. None of the volunteers were vaccinated. Among the study participants, 2 were eliminated due to prior infection, 18 showed "sustained viral load", and were designated as "infected", with the remainder designated "uninfected". Of the 11 cognitive tasks administered across multiple sessions, Object Memory, both Immediate and Delayed, yielded the largest differences between the "infected" and "uninfected" groups, with the "infected" group performing worse, particularly in Object Memory Immediate. Cognitive changes were still observed after around one year, and the authors noted that this would likely be the sole human challenge study involving SARS-CoV-2.

In October 2024, a paper published in Nature Translational Psychiatry studied brain and cognitive changes from Italian adolescents and young adults before and after a COVID infection. Participants totaled 13 infected, with 27 serving as controls. The cohort was obtained by convenience sample from another study, which was evaluating the effects of heavy metal exposure in Northern Italy. In addition to MRI scans, the cohort was also tasked with completing the Cambridge Neuropsychological Test Automated Battery (CANTAB). Significant changes in brain volume were observed in certain areas of the brain, especially in areas tasked with smell and cognition, but no significant changes were seen in "whole brain connectivity". The authors of the paper noted that the cognitive test results corroborated previous studies quantifying the impact of COVID-19 on various cognitive functions, but that a study with a larger sample size would be needed to properly account for confounding factors.

A large community study in England (112,964 completers) reported objectively measurable—but generally small—deficits in global cognition after SARS-CoV-2 infection, with larger deficits among people whose symptoms had not resolved ≥12 weeks ("unresolved" persistent symptoms). Estimated standardized differences versus a no-COVID group were about −0.23 to −0.24 SD among those who had recovered (short-duration or resolved persistent symptoms) and −0.42 SD among those with unresolved persistent symptoms. The largest deficits were on memory, reasoning, and executive-function tasks; deficits were greater after infections during earlier variant periods (original/Alpha) than during later periods (e.g., Omicron), and were more pronounced among individuals who had been hospitalized (especially ICU). The longer-term persistence and clinical significance remain uncertain.

== Research into COVID-19 induced brain damage ==
Neurological complications in COVID-19 are a result of SARS-CoV-2 infection or a complication of post infection which can be due to (1) direct SARS-CoV-2 invasion on the CNS via systemic circulation or olfactory epithelium directed trans-synaptic mechanism; (2) Inflammatory mediated CNS damage due to cytokine storm and endothelitis; (3) Thrombosis mediated CNS damage due to SARS-CoV-2 interaction with host ACE2 receptor resulting in ACE2 downregulation, coagulation cascade activation, and multiple organ dysfunction; (4) Hypoxemic respiratory failures and cardiorespiratory effects due to SARS-CoV-2 invasion on brain stem.. SARS-CoV-2 could also enter the brain through retrograde transmission.

There is ongoing research about the short- and long-term damage COVID-19 may possibly cause to the brain. including in cases of 'long COVID'. For instance, a study showed how COVID-19 may cause microvascular brain pathology and endothelial cell-death, disrupting the blood–brain barrier. Another study identified neuroinflammation and an activation of adaptive and innate immune cells in the brain stem of COVID-19 patients. Brain-scans and cognitive tests of 785 UK Biobank participants (401 positive cases) suggests COVID-19 is associated with, at least temporary, changes to the brain that include:

- (greater) "reduction in grey matter thickness and tissue contrast in the orbitofrontal cortex and parahippocampal gyrus;"
- "changes in markers of tissue damage in regions that are functionally connected to the primary olfactory cortex;"
- "reduction in global brain size"
- as well as (greater) cognitive decline between the two time points of selected cognitive tests

It has been identified that anosmia present during the acute phase of illness can be a risk factor for developing brain damage. A study revealed that patients recovering from COVID-19 who experienced anosmia during the acute episode exhibited impulsive decision-making, functional brain alterations, cortical thinning, and changes in white matter integrity.

A study indicates that SARS-CoV-2 builds tunneling nanotubes from nose cells to gain access to the brain.

== Ethnoracial Disparities in Cognitive Effects of Long COVID ==
An April 2023 study published in Journal of the National Medical Association performed a quantitative secondary analysis on data collected from the Household Pulse Survey (HHPS) between June and October 2022. 108,000 responses were sampled weekly and were representative with respect to geographic location, race, and gender. A logistic regression analysis was conducted on responses to Phase 3.6 which includes questions on long COVID symptoms, vaccinations, and demographic characteristics. The study found that racial disparities in long COVID prevalence mirror those seen in acute COVID-19. In particular, Blacks and Hispanics were significantly more likely to report long COVID than Whites. Additionally, females also showed a higher likelihood of long COVID compared to males. The study indicated that disparities existed beyond racial and ethnic lines. Individuals with private health insurance and those vaccinated were less likely to report long COVID. Factors such as socioeconomic status, healthcare access, and occupational exposure are critical in understanding these disparities, as they can influence both the likelihood of contracting COVID-19 and the severity of its long-term effects. Overall, an understanding of the social determinants of health is needed to comprehensively address cognitive effects of Long COVID.
