= Cacosmia =

Cacosmia may refer to:

- Cacosmia, a form of the disorder dysosmia, or more specifically parosmia, characterised by an unpleasant smell sensation
- Cacosmia (plant), a genus of flowering plants
