= Phantosmia =

Smelling of an odor not actually there

Phantosmia (phantom smell), also called an olfactory hallucination or a phantom odor, is smelling an odor that is not actually there. It can occur in one nostril or both. Unpleasant phantosmia, also called cacosmia, is more common and is often described as smelling something that is burned, foul, spoiled, or rotten. Experiencing occasional phantom smells is normal and usually goes away on its own in time. When hallucinations of this type do not improve on their own or when they keep coming back, it can be very upsetting and can disrupt an individual's quality of life.

Olfactory hallucinations can be caused by common medical conditions such as nasal infections, nasal polyps, or dental problems. It can result from neurological conditions such as migraines, head injuries, strokes, Parkinson's disease, seizures, or brain tumors. It can also be a symptom of certain mental disorders such as depression, bipolar disorder, intoxication or withdrawal from drugs and alcohol, or psychotic disorders. Environmental exposures are sometimes the cause as well, such as tobacco smoke, exposure to certain types of chemicals (e.g., insecticides or solvents), or radiation treatment for head or neck cancer.

A physician can determine if the problem is with the sense of smell (olfactory system) or taste (gustatory system), or if it is caused by a neurological or psychiatric disorder. Phantosmia usually goes away on its own though this can sometimes be gradual and occur over several years. When caused by an illness (e.g., sinusitis), it should go away when the illness resolves. If the problem persists or causes significant discomfort, a doctor might recommend nasal saline drops, antidepressant or anticonvulsant medications, local anesthesia to parts of the nose, or in very rare circumstances, surgical procedures to remove the olfactory nerves or bulbs.

== Symptoms ==
Other olfactory disorders such as hyposmia and anosmia have been found to be a symptom of mood disorders (depression). However, it is not known what olfactory disorders occur and if they are indeed a symptom of a depressive disorder. It has been proposed that phantosmia may be an early sign of the neurodegenerative disease Parkinson's disease. It may also be a sign of an intracranial hemorrhage (brain tumours or epilepsy). Other studies have also found that the symptoms of phantosmia have been alleviated after the patient has been treated for depression. Another case of a 70-year-old male reported that his first abnormal symptoms were irregular bowel movements. After this the patient developed irregular eye movements and had developed a sleep and behavior disorder. He subsequently developed phantosmia, in which what he smelled was described as "stinky and unpleasant". The patient did not display any of the following symptoms: loss of awareness; confusion; automatisms; convulsive seizures; auditory/visual hallucinations.

=== Co-occurrence with other conditions ===
Phantosmia has been found to co-exist in patients with other disorders such as schizophrenia, epilepsy, alcoholic psychosis, and depression. It has also been found that many patients may begin to experience depression and suicidal feelings after developing severe phantosmia. The occurrence of depression results from the severe symptoms of phantosmia as everything, even food, smells spoilt, rotten and burnt for these patients. By the age of 80, 80% of individuals develop an olfactory disorder. As well 50% of these individuals also have anosmia.

==== Migraines ====
In 2011 Coleman, Grosberg and Robbins did a case study on patients with olfactory hallucinations and other primary headache disorders. In their 30-month long study, the prevalence rates for phantosmia turned out to be as low as 0.66%.

In their findings, it was observed that a typical hallucination period was of 5–60 minutes, occurred either before or with the onset of head pain, and typically consisted of an unpleasant odor. It was also noted that phantosmia occurs most commonly among women having a migraine complaint. In their study, prophylactic therapy for headaches helped cure phantosmia in most of the patients.

This finding is consistent with the findings of Schreiber and Calvert in 1986 which also mentioned the olfactory hallucinations before the occurrence of a migraine attack in four of their subjects.

== Causes ==
The cause of phantosmia can be either peripheral or central, or a combination of the two. The peripheral explanation of this disorder is that rogue neurons malfunction and transmit incorrect signals to the brain or it may be due to the malfunction of the olfactory neurons. The central explanation is that active or incorrectly functioning cells of the brain cause the perception of the disturbing odor. Another central cause is that the perception of the phantom odor usually follows after the occurrence of seizures. The time span of the symptoms usually lasts a few seconds.

Other studies on phantosmia patients have found that the perception of the odor initiates with a sneeze, thus they avoid any nasal activity. It has also been found that the perception of the odor is worse in the nostril that is weaker in olfaction ability. It has also been noted that about a quarter of patients with phantosmia in one nostril will usually develop it in the other nostril as well over a time period of a few months or years.

Several patients who have received surgical treatment have stated that they have a feeling or intuition that the phantom odor is about to occur, however it does not. This sensation has been supported by positron emission tomography, and it has been found that these patients have a high level of activity in their contralateral frontal, insular and temporal regions. The significance of the activity in these regions is not definitive as not a significant number of patients have been studied to conclude any relation of this activity with the symptoms. However the intensity of the activity in these regions was reduced by excising the olfactory epithelium from the associated nasal cavity.

There are a few causes for phantosmia, but one of the most common and well-documented involves brain injury or seizures in the temporal lobe. During a temporal lobe seizure the patient rarely faints, but usually blacks out and cannot remember anything that happened during the seizure. Several people who have had these seizures did, however, recollect having phantosmia just prior to blacking out. Epilepsy is a disease characterized by seizures. In the case of phantosmia, if smelling and something else become so strongly linked, the action of "something else" occurring can induce activation of the olfactory bulb even though there was no stimulus for the bulb present. This is an example of plasticity gone awry. Those with lesions on the temporal lobe, often brought about by a stroke but also from trauma to the head, also experience these olfactory hallucinations.

Other leading causes of phantosmia include neurological disorders such as schizophrenia and Alzheimer's disease. Both of these disorders have well documented cases of hallucinations, most commonly visual and auditory. Both also, however, have instances of phantosmia too, although not as frequently. In both cases, instances of olfactory delusions are more common, especially in Alzheimer's, where it is exceedingly difficult to convince the patient that these are in fact hallucinations and not real. Specifically in Alzheimer's disease, atrophy in the temporal lobe has been known to occur. As evidenced in trauma and seizures, phantosmia is strongly associated with this area; leading to its appearance in some Alzheimer's patients. Parkinson's disease patients can also experience phantosmia, as well as parosmia, however their appearance is less common than the muscle tremors the patients experience.

=== Neuroblastoma ===
Neuroblastoma is a rare form of a malignant cancer which can start in the olfactory nerve, which is responsible for smell sensation. This cancer can become aggressive and progress into the ethmoid sinuses, brain cavity, surrounds the cribriform plate. The tumor can be tested for by performing a surgical biopsy and the possible treatment options include surgical removal of the tumor, radiation therapy and chemotherapy, which can cause damage to the olfactory system and possibly result in phantosmia, in turn.

=== Development ===
The complaints of phantosmia involving the perception of unpleasant odors most commonly include "burnt", "foul", "rotten", "sewage", "metallic" or "chemical". Sometimes the odor is described as exhaust fumes. These odors may be triggered by strong odorants, changes in nasal airflow, or even loud sounds. Sometimes they occur spontaneously. Patients having complaints of phantosmia might self-admit a poor quality of life, with each meal having the unpleasant odor as well. The disorder's first onset, usually spontaneous, may last only a few minutes. Recurrences may gradually increase from monthly, then weekly, and then daily over a period of six months to a year. The duration of the perceived odor may also increase over the same time, often lasting most of a day after one year. Some patients also state that the odor they smell is different from any known odor.

== Diagnosis ==
The most challenging task for the examiner is to determine and obtain the correct symptoms and associate them with one of the olfactory disorders, as there are several of them and they are related to each other.

The first step the examiner usually takes is to investigate if the problem is olfactory or gustatory related. As it may be that the patient releases certain bodily odors that are causing them to have this perception.

If the examiner is able to confirm that the problem is olfactory related, the next step is to determine which olfactory disorder the patient has. The following is a list of possible olfactory disorders:

- anosmia
- hyposmia
- hyperosmia
- dysosmia
  - parosmia or troposmia
  - phantosmia

The second step is difficult for both the examiner and the patient as the patient has some difficulty describing their perception of the phantom odor. Furthermore, the patient is in a position of stress and anxiety thus it is crucial that the examiner be patient.

After determining the nature of the disorder, and confirming phantosmia, the examiner must then have the patient describe their perception of the phantom odor. In many cases, patients have described the odor to be that of something burning and rotten and have described it to be unpleasant and foul.

The third step for the examiner is to determine the health history of the patient to take note of head trauma, accidents, upper respiratory infections, allergic rhinitis or chronic rhinitis. Although these may be events that have resulted in the phantom odor, studies conducted by Zilstrof have found that the majority of phantosmia patients have no previous history of head trauma and upper respiratory infections.

== Treatment ==
Due to the rareness of the disorder there is no well-defined treatment. Sometimes the patients are just told to live with the disorder or the patients end up performing "stereotypical methods" that might help in reducing the severity of the odor. This might include forced crying, bending over holding knees while holding breath, rinsing the nose with saline water and gagging. All these behaviours at the end fail to resolve the hallucination. Various treatments like prophylaxis have been suggested but more research is needed for its confirmation. Also, due to being a poorly understood disorder, and having analogies to some psychiatric conditions, some patients are told that they have a mental illness.

One of the surgical treatments proposed has included olfactory bulb ablation through a bifrontal craniotomy approach. But a counter-argument by Leopold, Loehrl and Schwob (2002) has stated that this ablation process results in a bilateral permanent anosmia and includes risks associated with a craniotomy. According to them, the use of transnasal endoscopic exhibition of olfactory epithelium is a safe and effective treatment for patients with unremitting phantosmia with the olfactory function being potentially spared. It is also cautioned that the surgery is challenging one and is associated with major risks, and that it should be restricted to expertise centres.

On the other hand, many cases have also reported that the strength of their symptoms have decreased with time. (Duncan and Seidan, 1995) A case involving long term phantosmia has been treated with the use of an anti depressive medication by the common name Venlafaxine (Effexor). The relation between mood disorders and phantosmia is unknown, and is a widely researched area. In many cases, the symptoms of phantosmia have been reduced by the use of anticonvulsants and antidepressants that act on the central and peripheral neurons.

The most commonly used treatment method is the removal of the olfactory epithelium or the bulb by means of surgery to alleviate the patient from the symptoms. Other traditional methods include the use of topical anesthetics (Zilstorff-Pederson, 1995) and use of sedatives.

=== Nasal spray ===
Many patients seeking a quick form of relief achieved it by rinsing the nose with a saline solution. This treatment option is easily available and can be repeated several times throughout the day to obtain relief. An example of a nasal spray that can be used to alleviate symptoms is Oxymetazoline HCl, which seems to provide relief for a longer time period. The relief achieved by the use of nasal sprays seems to be because it results in the blockage of the nostril that does not allow any air to enter the olfactory cleft.

=== Topical solutions ===
Another treatment option is the topical solution of cocaine HCl which also provides relief for a short time period by acting as an anesthetic and desensitizing the nasal neurons. The topical solution is applied on the nostril. This topical solution can have several side effects as it has been found that some patients with troposmia started to show symptoms of phantosmia after its use. Other patients have lost complete function of the nostril where the drug was applied.

=== Venlafaxine ===
Structure of Venlafaxine

This antidepressant medication is a serotonin norepinephrine reuptake inhibitor (SNRI). In the case study of a 52-year-old female with phantosmia for 27 years, a dose of 75 mg a day relieved and eliminated her symptoms. The drug was prescribed initially in order to treat her depression.

== Occurrence ==
Phantosmia is most likely to occur in women between the ages of 15 and 30 years. The duration of the first hallucination(s) is likely to be from five to twenty minutes. It has also been found that the second hallucination is likely to occur approximately a month later in the same manner as the first. Over time, the length of the hallucination(s) may begin to increase.

== Pregnancy ==
A longitudinal study on pregnant women found that 76% of pregnant women experienced significant changes in gustation and olfaction perception. This was found to be caused and linked to their pregnancy. The study concluded that 67% of the pregnant women had reported a higher level of sensitivity to smell, 17% had an olfactory distortion and 14% had phantosmia; these distortions were very minimal towards the last stages of pregnancy and in the majority were not present post partum. Furthermore, 26% of these participants also claimed that they also experienced an increased sensitivity to foods that were bitter and a decreased sensitivity to salt. These findings suggest that pregnant women experience distorted smell and taste perception during pregnancy. It has also been found that 75% of women alter their diets during pregnancy. Further research is being conducted to determine the mechanism behind food cravings during pregnancy.

== Case studies ==
=== Surgical treatment with the preservation of olfactory ability ===
A 1991 study followed the case of a 26-year-old woman who was diagnosed with mononucleosis at the age of 18. After this diagnosis she began to experience headaches on the right side of her head, and phantosmia in her left nostril that would often occur together. The olfactory hallucination reported by the woman was an unpleasant mixture of vinegar, fecal material, and rotten eggs. This would happen every day beginning in the morning, and the symptoms would worsen during the few days before her menstrual period. If the symptoms did not occur in the morning, they would be triggered by strong olfactory stimuli or by loud noises. Occasionally she could avoid the phantosmia symptoms by forcing herself to sneeze.

The woman consulted many medical practitioners but could not receive a reliable diagnosis. She was prescribed medications including nasal steroid sprays and other drugs, but they would not relieve her of her headaches and phantosmia symptoms. Through chemosensory evaluation, it was found that her senses of smell and taste were working normally. Due to some phantosmias believed to be caused by a blockage causing the odor molecules to not reach the olfactory receptors, doctors surgically widened the olfactory cleft. Unfortunately, the phantosmia symptoms remained. Further unsuccessful treatment included a long-term disruption of the axonal projections from the primary olfactory sensory neurons onto the olfactory bulb. This was accomplished by intranasal irrigation with zinc sulfate.

The patient was successfully treated with a surgical procedure involving permanent disruption of the olfactory epithelium. This was accomplished with the surgical excision of a "plug" of olfactory epithelium from the area of the cribriform plate, as opposed to more radical procedures available at the time, such as olfactory bulbectomy, which results in loss of olfactory ability, and has been found to result in further neurological affectations in rodent studies. The reduced excision performed in the study was meant to sever all the olfactory fiber bundles that entered the central nervous system from her left nostril. Five weeks after surgery, the woman reported a complete absence of her phantosmia symptoms, and a return to pre-operative olfactory function.

=== Drug treatment ===
For a 52-year-old woman, phantosmia occurring as fluctuating episodes occurred for a period of 27 years, and there was no discernible reason for the onset of symptoms. She could weaken the symptoms by rinsing her nose with a saline solution, and by going to sleep. The smells she would encounter often were very unpleasant, resembling a burnt and rotten fruity odor. When her family doctor prescribed her the antidepressant venlafaxine, she noticed that the drug resulted in the complete elimination of her phantosmia symptoms. This discovery has caused scientists and doctors to research if a link between phantosmia and mild depressive disorders exists, and this idea is supported by the reported improvement of phantosmia after repeated transcranial stimulation used to treat depression.

=== Co-morbidity with Parkinson's disease ===
In the case of a 57-year-old woman, strong olfactory sensations were reported, ranging from odors of perfume to slightly unpleasant odors of "wet dog". The episodes experienced would last between seconds and hours and would occur multiple times per day. The patient would report phantosmia symptoms, but would correctly identify known odors and would claim to have no symptoms of smell loss. She had no history of epilepsy, and her electroencephalographic results were normal. Later on, while the symptoms of phantosmia were decreasing, she developed severe symptoms of Parkinson disease. While the patient was treated for her tremors with pramipexole, amantadine hydrochloride, levodopa, carbidopa and entacapone, the phantosmia symptoms disappeared completely.

In the case of a 52-year-old woman, the first symptoms of phantosmia reported appeared to the woman as an increased sense of smell. She believed to have the ability to detect odors before other people, and with better accuracy. She later began to experience the typical symptoms of phantosmia and would smell things that she could recognize in the absence of any odor producing molecules. The reported smells were of perfumes, candles, and fruits, however the woman could not accurately identify what type of perfume or fruit she was smelling. Her phantosmia episodes would occur abruptly and would last from minutes to half an hour. A rhinologic examination came back with normal results. When her phantosmia symptoms began to dissipate, she began to complain of clumsiness, slowness, and problems with her left hand that would alternate between tremors and rigidity. A neurologic examination revealed symptoms of Parkinson's disease.

== See also ==
=== Related disorders ===
- Anosmia
- Dysosmia
- Hyperosmia
- Hyposmia
- Parosmia (or troposmia)

=== Other ===
- Odorant-binding protein
- Odorant receptor
- Olfactory bulb mitral cell
- Olfactory receptor neuron
- Olfactory tubercle
