= Congenital anosmia =

Congenital Anosmia
- Other names: Isolated Congenital Anosmia
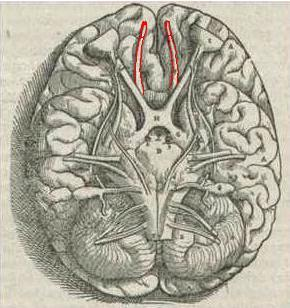
- Olfactory bulbs and olfactory tracts outlined in red. These structures, which are critical for the sense of smell, are missing or underdeveloped in individuals with congenital anosmia.
- Specialty: Otorhinolaryngology
- Symptoms: Complete inability to perceive smell from birth
- Complications: Safety risks (e.g., inability to detect smoke or gas leaks), potential nutritional issues
- Usual onset: Birth
- Duration: Lifelong
- Types: Isolated, Syndromic (e.g., Kallmann syndrome)
- Causes: Genetic mutations, developmental defects of the olfactory bulbs and tracts
- Risk factors: Genetic predisposition
- Diagnostic method: Medical history, physical examination, smell tests, brain imaging (MRI/CT), nasal endoscopy, olfactory nerve testing
- Differential diagnosis: Acquired anosmia, other olfactory disorders
- Prevention: None
- Treatment: No cure; management includes safety precautions and coping strategies
- Medication: None
- Prognosis: Lifelong condition with management of associated risks
- Frequency: Approximately 1 in 10,000 individuals

Congenital anosmia is a rare condition characterized by the complete inability to perceive smell from birth. It affects approximately 1 in 10,000 individuals and is often diagnosed later in life due to its subtle presentation and lack of associated symptoms.

== Details ==
Diagnosis typically involves clinical evaluation, smell tests, and imaging studies to identify any structural abnormalities in the olfactory system. This condition can occur in isolation or as part of a syndrome, such as Kallmann syndrome or CHARGE syndrome.

There is no known cure for congenital anosmia. Management focuses on safety precautions to mitigate risks associated with the inability to smell, such as not detecting smoke or gas leaks.

== Diagnosis ==
There is no single test to definitively diagnose congenital anosmia. Instead, the diagnosis is made through a combination of clinical evaluations, smell tests, imaging studies, and the exclusion of other potential causes of smell loss. This comprehensive approach ensures that other conditions that might interfere with the sense of smell are ruled out before confirming a diagnosis of congenital anosmia.

The diagnostic process typically includes the following steps:

- Detailed medical history: Physicians will inquire about the patient's history of smell loss, focusing on whether the patient has ever been able to smell. A history of never having the ability to smell is indicative of congenital anosmia.
- Physical examination: A thorough ear, nose, and throat (ENT) examination is performed to check for any structural abnormalities or conditions that could affect the sense of smell.
- Smell tests: Standardized olfactory tests are used to assess the patient's ability to detect and identify odors. Common tests include the Sniffin' Sticks test and the University of Pennsylvania Smell Identification Test (UPSIT). These tests help determine the severity of smell loss and can differentiate between partial (hyposmia) and complete (anosmia) loss of smell.
- Nasal endoscopy: This procedure allows the physician to examine the nasal cavity and look for any abnormalities that might be causing smell loss.
- Imaging studies: Brain imaging techniques such as MRI or CT scans are used to evaluate the olfactory bulbs, tracts, and related brain structures. In congenital anosmia, these scans may reveal aplasia (absence) or hypoplasia (underdevelopment) of the olfactory bulbs or tracts.
- Genetic testing: In some cases, especially when congenital anosmia is suspected to be part of a syndrome (e.g., Kallmann syndrome), genetic testing may be recommended to identify any associated genetic mutations.
- Exclusion of other causes: The diagnosis of isolated congenital anosmia is often made by ruling out other potential causes of smell loss, including head trauma, infections, and neurodegenerative diseases.

Many individuals with congenital anosmia are unaware of their condition until later in childhood or adolescence when they begin to realize they cannot smell things that others can. Therefore, diagnosis may not occur until well after birth, despite the condition being present from birth.

A multidisciplinary approach involving ENT specialists, neurologists, and geneticists may be necessary for a comprehensive diagnosis, especially in complex cases or when congenital anosmia is suspected to be part of a broader syndrome.

== Challenges of living with congenital anosmia ==
=== Safety concerns ===
The inability to detect odors poses safety risks such as the inability to smell smoke or gas leaks, difficulty identifying spoiled food (leading to food poisoning), and challenges in detecting harmful chemicals or fumes.

=== Social and psychological impact ===
- Hygiene concerns: Individuals may worry about their body odor and personal hygiene, as they cannot detect these smells themselves.
- Eating challenges: The sense of smell is closely linked to the sense of taste, making the experience of eating less enjoyable for some. Additionally, the sense of smell often triggers hunger or the desire to eat more food when smelling it, but such triggers do not exist for congenital anosmics. This can lead to eating problems and make social situations, like meals with family and friends, less enjoyable. However, a few individuals with congenital anosmia learn to enjoy food despite the lack of smell or aroma, finding ways to appreciate the texture and flavor of food through other means.

=== Memory and emotional impact ===
The sense of smell is closely linked to memory and emotions because the olfactory system is connected to the brain's limbic system, which is involved in emotional processing and memory formation. This connection means that specific scents can trigger vivid memories and strong emotional responses. For example, the smell of a particular perfume might remind someone of a loved one, or the scent of freshly baked cookies could evoke childhood memories. Without the sense of smell, individuals with congenital anosmia may miss out on these powerful sensory experiences that enhance and enrich one's emotional lives and memories.

== Treatment ==
Currently, there is no definitive treatment for congenital anosmia, as the condition involves the absence or underdevelopment of the olfactory bulbs and tracts, which are critical for the sense of smell. Management primarily focuses on safety precautions and coping strategies to mitigate the risks associated with the inability to smell.

=== Safety precautions ===
According to medical professionals and patient support organizations such as Fifth Sense, individuals with congenital anosmia are advised to take several safety measures to protect themselves from potential hazards. These measures include:

- Smoke and gas detectors: Installing and maintaining smoke detectors and carbon monoxide alarms in the home is essential, as individuals with anosmia cannot rely on their sense of smell to detect smoke or gas leaks.
- Food safety: Properly labeling foods with expiration dates and being cautious with food storage can help prevent the consumption of spoiled food, which individuals with anosmia may not be able to detect by smell.
- Use of electric appliances: Using electric appliances instead of gas-powered ones can reduce the risk of undetected gas leaks.

=== Coping strategies ===
While there is no cure for congenital anosmia, individuals can use psychological counseling and support groups to help individuals cope with the emotional and practical challenges of living without a sense of smell.

=== Research and future directions ===
Research into potential treatments for congenital anosmia is ongoing. Gene therapy has shown promise in animal models, where scientists have successfully restored the sense of smell in mice with congenital anosmia. Additionally, identifying the genetic causes of congenital anosmia could lead to the development of targeted gene therapies for humans in the future.

Clinical trials and research studies are being conducted to explore new treatments and improve the understanding of congenital anosmia. Individuals with congenital anosmia may consider participating in these studies to contribute to scientific advancements and potentially benefit from emerging therapies.

== Epidemiology ==
Congenital anosmia is a rare condition, with limited large-scale epidemiological studies available. The exact prevalence is difficult to determine due to underreporting and challenges in early diagnosis. However, it is estimated to affect approximately 1 in 10,000 individuals.

== Research institutes working on congenital anosmia ==
Located in Philadelphia, USA, the Monell Chemical Senses Center is a research institute focused on the senses of smell and taste. The lab of Joel Mainland has been studying genetic inheritance patterns to identify genes that cause congenital anosmia. This research is part of a broader effort to understand the mechanisms of smell and develop effective treatments for smell disorders.

The NYU Langone Health Anosmia Center specializes in diagnosing and treating anosmia, including congenital anosmia. The center's team of otolaryngologists conducts evaluations and research to improve understanding and management of smell disorders.

Located in Gainesville, FL, the University of Florida Center for Smell and Taste coordinates and promotes research on taste and smell. Researchers are exploring gene therapy approaches to restore the sense of smell in individuals with congenital anosmia.

Fifth Sense is a UK-based charity dedicated to supporting people with smell and taste disorders. They collaborate with researchers and institutions to advance the understanding of congenital anosmia. They provide resources, support, and advocacy for individuals affected by the condition.

Under the direction of Professor Thomas Hummel, the University of Dresden Smell and Taste Center in Germany conducts fundamental and clinical research on the diagnosis, consequences, and treatments of anosmia, including congenital anosmia.

Smell and Taste Association of North America is a non-profit organization dedicated to advancing research, education, and advocacy for individuals affected by smell and taste disorders, including congenital anosmia. STANA connects researchers, clinicians, and patients. The organization promotes research initiatives and raises awareness about chemosensory disorders. STANA collaborates with various research institutions and is involved in organizing conferences that bring together scientists, clinicians, and individuals with smell and taste disorders to further research and understanding of conditions like congenital anosmia.

== Notable people with congenital anosmia ==
- Ben Cohen: Co-founder of Ben & Jerry's ice cream company. He has had anosmia since at least childhood. His anosmia has influenced the texture-rich formulations of their ice creams.
- Jason Sudeikis: American actor and comedian, known for his work on Saturday Night Live and Ted Lasso. He was born without a sense of smell.
- Perrie Edwards: Singer with the British girl group Little Mix. It is believed she has congenital anosmia.
- William Wordsworth: While not definitively confirmed, some scholars believe the famous English Romantic poet may have had congenital anosmia based on his writings.

== In popular media ==
- This Is What It's Like to Live in a World Without Smell: A short film that showcases the experiences of individuals living with congenital anosmia. It provides a personal perspective on how the absence of smell affects daily life and emotional experiences.
- Anosmia by Jacob LaMendola: A documentary short film that delves into the life of the filmmaker, who has congenital anosmia. The film explores the sensory experiences and challenges faced by those who cannot smell.
- Let's Talk Smell and Taste: A short film produced by Fifth Sense, featuring members of the anosmia community sharing their stories and the impact of the condition on their lives. The film highlights the emotional and social aspects of living without the sense of smell.

== See also ==
- Anosmia
- Anosmia Awareness Day
