= OR11H7 =

Protein-coding gene in the species Homo sapiens

Identifiers
- Aliases: OR11H7, OR11H7P, olfactory receptor family 11 subfamily H member 7 (gene/pseudogene)
- External IDs: MGI: 3030580; GeneCards: OR11H7

Gene location (Mouse)
Chr.	Chromosome 14 (mouse)
Band	14|14 C1	Start	50,884,540 bp
Band	14|14 C1	End	50,891,640 bp
Gene ontology
Molecular function	G protein-coupled receptor activity; olfactory receptor activity; signal transducer activity; G protein-coupled serotonin receptor activity; neurotransmitter receptor activity
Cellular component	integral component of membrane; plasma membrane; membrane; integral component of plasma membrane; dendrite
Biological process	sensory perception of smell; detection of chemical stimulus involved in sensory perception of smell; signal transduction; response to stimulus; G protein-coupled serotonin receptor signaling pathway; G protein-coupled receptor signaling pathway; G protein-coupled receptor signaling pathway, coupled to cyclic nucleotide second messenger; chemical synaptic transmission
Sources:Amigo / QuickGO
Orthologs
Databases	NCBI: entry; OMA: entry
Species	Human	Mouse
Entrez	390441	258295
Ensembl	ENSG00000258806	ENSMUSG00000058188
UniProt	Q8NGC8	E9Q840
RefSeq (mRNA)	NM_001348273	NM_146298
RefSeq (protein)	NP_001335202	NP_666410
Location (UCSC)	n/a	Chr 14: 50.88 – 50.89 Mb
PubMed search
- Wikidata
View/Edit Human	View/Edit Mouse

Olfactory receptor family 11 subfamily H member 7 (gene/pseudogene) is a protein that in humans is encoded by the OR11H7 gene.

== Function ==
In most humans, OR11H7 is a pseudogene, meaning it does not result in the creation of a functional olfactory receptor protein that binds to specific odorants, although it may be functional in others. Other individuals, however, carry a single-nucleotide polymorphism on one or both chromosomes which transforms it from a pseudogene into an intact gene, and they are significantly more likely to exhibit hyperosmia to the chemical isovaleric acid. Isovaleric acid was shown to be a ligand of OR11H7.

== See also ==
- Olfactory receptor
