= Dysosmia =

Distortion of the perception of smell

- Specialty: Neurology

Dysosmia is a disorder described as any qualitative alteration or distortion of the perception of smell. Qualitative alterations differ from quantitative alterations, which include anosmia and hyposmia. Dysosmia can be classified as either parosmia (also called troposmia) or phantosmia. Parosmia is a distortion in the perception of an odorant. Odorants smell different from what one remembers. Phantosmia is the perception of an odor when no odorant is present. The cause of dysosmia still remains a theory. It is typically considered a neurological disorder and clinical associations with the disorder have been made. Most cases are described as idiopathic and the main antecedents related to parosmia are URTIs, head trauma, and nasal and paranasal sinus disease. Dysosmia tends to go away on its own but there are options for treatment for patients that want immediate relief.

== Signs and symptoms ==
Smell disorders can result in the inability to detect environmental dangers such as gas leaks, toxins, or smoke. In addition to safety, nutritional and eating habits can also be affected. There is a loss of appetite because of unpleasant flavor and fear of failing to recognize and consuming spoiled food. A decreased or distorted sense of smell therefore results in a decreased quality of life. Distortions are believed to have a greater negative impact on people than the complete loss of smell because they are constantly reminded of the disorder and the distortions have a greater effect on eating habits.

== Classification and terminology ==
Olfactory dysfunction can be quantitative or qualitative. Quantitative smell disorders are disorders in which there is complete or partial loss of olfaction. Anosmia, the complete loss of olfaction, and hyposmia, the partial loss of olfaction are the two disorders classified as quantitative because they can be measured. Qualitative smell disorders cannot be measured and are disorders in which there is alternation or distortion in the perception of smell. Qualitative disorders include parosmia (also called troposmia) and phantosmia. Dysosmia is a qualitative olfaction disorder and includes both parosmia and phantosmia. Olfactory dysfunction including anosmia, hyposmia, and dysosmia can be either bilateral or unilateral on either nostril. Anosmia only on the left nostril would be termed unilateral left anosmia while bilateral anosmia would be termed total anosmia. If the distortion is unpleasant, the disorder can be referred to as cacosmia. Under an alternative definition, cacosmia is used for an unpleasant perception of an odorant due specifically to nasosinusal or pharyngeal infection. The rare term torquosmia can be used when the perceived smell is chemical, burning or metallic.

=== Parosmia ===
Parosmia is a distortion in the perception of an odorant. Odorants smell different from what one remembers.

=== Phantosmia ===
Phantosmia is the perception of an odor when there is no odorant present. When a phantom smell lasts less than a few seconds, the term olfactory hallucination can be used.

== Cause ==
Even though the causes of dysosmia are not yet clear, there are two general theories that describe the etiology: the peripheral and central theories. In parosmia, the peripheral theory refers to the inability to form a complete picture of an odorant due to the loss of functioning olfactory receptor neurons. The central theory refers to integrative centers in the brain forming a distorted odor. In phantosmia, the peripheral theory refers to neurons emitting abnormal signals to the brain or the loss of inhibitory cells that are normally present in normal functioning. The central theory for phantosmia is described as an area of hyper-functioning brain cells that generate the order perception. Evidence to support these theories include findings that for the majority of individuals with distortions, there is a loss of sensitivity to smell that accompanies it and the distortions are worse at the time of the decreased sensitivity. It has been reported in parosmia cases that patients can identify triggering stimuli. Common triggers include gasoline, tobacco, coffee, perfume, fruits and chocolate.

The cause of dysosmia has not been determined but there have been clinical associations with the neurological disorder:

- Upper respiratory tract infection (URTIs)
- Nasal and paranasal sinus disease
- Toxic chemical exposure
- Neurological abnormalities
- Head trauma
- Nasal surgery
- Tumors on the frontal lobe or olfactory bulb
- Epilepsy

Most of cases are described as idiopathic and the main antecedents related to parosmia are URTIs, head trauma, and nasal and paranasal sinus disease. Psychiatric causes for smell distortion can exist in schizophrenia, alcoholic psychosis, depression, and olfactory reference syndrome.

== Pathophysiology ==
=== Anatomy and physiology ===
Human olfactory system. 1: Olfactory bulb 2: Mitral cells 3: Bone 4: Nasal epithelium 5: Glomerulus (olfaction) 6: Olfactory receptor cells

==== Olfactory receptors ====
The olfactory neuroepithelium, located in the roof of the nasal chambers, comprises bipolar receptor cells, supporting cells, basal cells, and brush cells. There are approximately 6 million bipolar sensory receptor neurons whose cell bodies and dendrites are in the epithelium. The axons of these cells aggregate into 30-40 fascicles, called the olfactory fila, which project through the cribriform plate and pia matter. These axons collectively make up the olfactory nerve (CN I) and serve the purpose of mediating the sense of smell.

Characteristics of the bipolar receptor neurons include cilia on the dendritic ends which project into the mucus, regeneration from basal cells after damage, and each receptor neuron is also a first order neuron. The first order neurons project axons directly from the nasal chamber to the brain. Its first neuron characteristic allows direct exposure to the environment, which makes the brain vulnerable to infection and invasion of xenobiotic agents. Supporting cells, called sustentacular cells, provide metabolic and physical support to the receptors by insulating the cell and regulating the composition of the mucus. Basal stem cells give rise to both neurons and non-neuronal cells and allow for constant regeneration of receptor cells and its surrounding cell.

==== Olfactory transduction ====
Olfactory transduction begins with the movement of odorants from the air phase to the aqueous phase in the olfactory mucus. Odorants are transported by odorant binding proteins or diffuse through the mucus and reach the cilia on the dendritic ends of bipolar receptor neurons. Stimulation causes action potentials to be initiated and the signals are sent to the brain via the olfactory fila.

==== Olfactory bulb ====
Olfactory receptor neuron axons project through the cribriform plate to the olfactory bulb. The olfactory bulb is a structure at the base of the frontal lobe. It comprises neurons, nerve fibers, interneurons, microglia, astrocytes, and blood vessels. It is made up of 6 layers: olfactory nerve layer, glomerular layer, external plexiform layer, mitral cell layer, internal plexiform layer, and granule layer. The terminals of the receptor axons synapse with the dendrites of mitral and tufts cells within the glomeruli of the olfactory bulb. The axons of the mitral and tufts cells send signals to the olfactory cortex.

==== Olfactory cortex ====
Signals from odor sensation are sent from the olfactory bulb through mitral and tufts cell axons via the lateral olfactory tract and synapse at the primary olfactory cortex. The primary olfactory cortex includes the anterior olfactory nucleus, the piriform cortex, the anterior cortical nucleus of the amygdala, the periamygdaloid complex, and the rostral entorhinal cortex. A unique characteristic of olfaction is its independence from the thalamus. The odor signals are sent directly from the sensory receptor neuron to the primary cortex. However, communication between the primary and secondary olfactory cortex requires connections with the thalamus.

=== Odor perception ===
Odor identity, quality, and familiarity are mainly deciphered by the piriform cortex. Consciousness of smell is achieved by projections from the piriform cortex to the medial dorsal nucleus of the thalamus and to the orbitofrontal cortex, which the secondary olfactory cortex is part of.

There are approximately 1,000 olfactory receptors coded for in the human genome. Less than 500 receptors are functional in the nasal epithelium. Each receptor neuron is a single type of olfactory receptor and is not specific to any one odorant. An odorant is recognized by more than one type of receptor and thus odorants are recognized by a combination of receptors. The olfactory system relies on different excitation patterns to obtain different codes for different odorants. Nobel prize recipient Linda B. Buck compared this system to combining different letters of the alphabet to produce different words. In this case, each word represents an odor. This coding explains why we can detect more odors than there are receptors in the nasal epithelium.

=== Olfaction and flavor ===
Flavor is perceived by the combination of the sense of taste, sense of smell, and the trigeminal nerve (CN V). The gustatory system is responsible for differentiation between sweet, sour, salty, bitter, and umami. The olfactory system recognizes the odorants as they pass to the olfactory epithelium via a retronasal pathway. This explains why we can identify a variety of flavors in spite of only having five types of taste receptors. The trigeminal nerve senses texture, pain, and temperature of food, and related qualities such as the cooling effect of menthol or the burning sensation of spicy food.

== Diagnosis ==
Diagnosing dysosmia precisely can be difficult due to the variety of causes and symptoms. Often, patients may be unsure whether or not they are having issues with smell or taste specifically. It is important to identify whether the distortion applies to an inhaled odorant or if an odor exists without the stimulus. Distortion of an odorant is presented in two types: when the stimuli are different from what one remembers, and when everything has a similar smell. A clinical history can also help determine what kind of dysosmia one has, as events such as respiratory infection and head trauma are usually indications of parosmia. Phantosmia often occurs spontaneously. There are no wholly accurate diagnostic tests or methods for dysosmia; evaluation must be done through questionnaires and medical history.

== Treatment ==
Even though dysosmia often goes away on its own over time, there are both medical and surgical treatments for dysosmia for patients who want immediate relief. Medical treatments include the use of topical nasal drops and oxymetazoline HCL, which give an upper nasal block so that the air flow cannot reach the olfactory cleft. Other medications suggested include sedatives, anti-depressants, and anti-epileptic drugs. The medications may or may not work and for some patients, and side effects may not be tolerable. Most patients benefit from medical treatment, but for some, surgical treatment is required. Options include a bifrontal craniotomy and excision of the olfactory epithelium, which cuts all of the fila olfactoria. According to some studies, transnasal endoscopic excision of the olfactory epithelium has been described as a safe and effective phantosmia treatment. Bifrontal craniotomy results in permanent anosmia, and both surgeries are accompanied with the risks associated with general surgery.

== Epidemiology ==
The frequency of phantosmia is rare in comparison with the frequency of parosmia. Parosmia has been estimated to be in 10–60% of patients with olfactory dysfunction and from studies, it has been shown that it can last anywhere from 3 months to 22 years. Smell and taste problems result in over 200,000 visits to physicians annually in the US. Lately, it has been thought that phantosmia might co-occur with Parkinson's disease. However, its potential to be a premotor biomarker for Parkinson's is still up for debate as not all patients with Parkinson's disease have olfactory disorders.
