= Anosmia Awareness Day =

Day to spread awareness about individuals who lose sense of smell

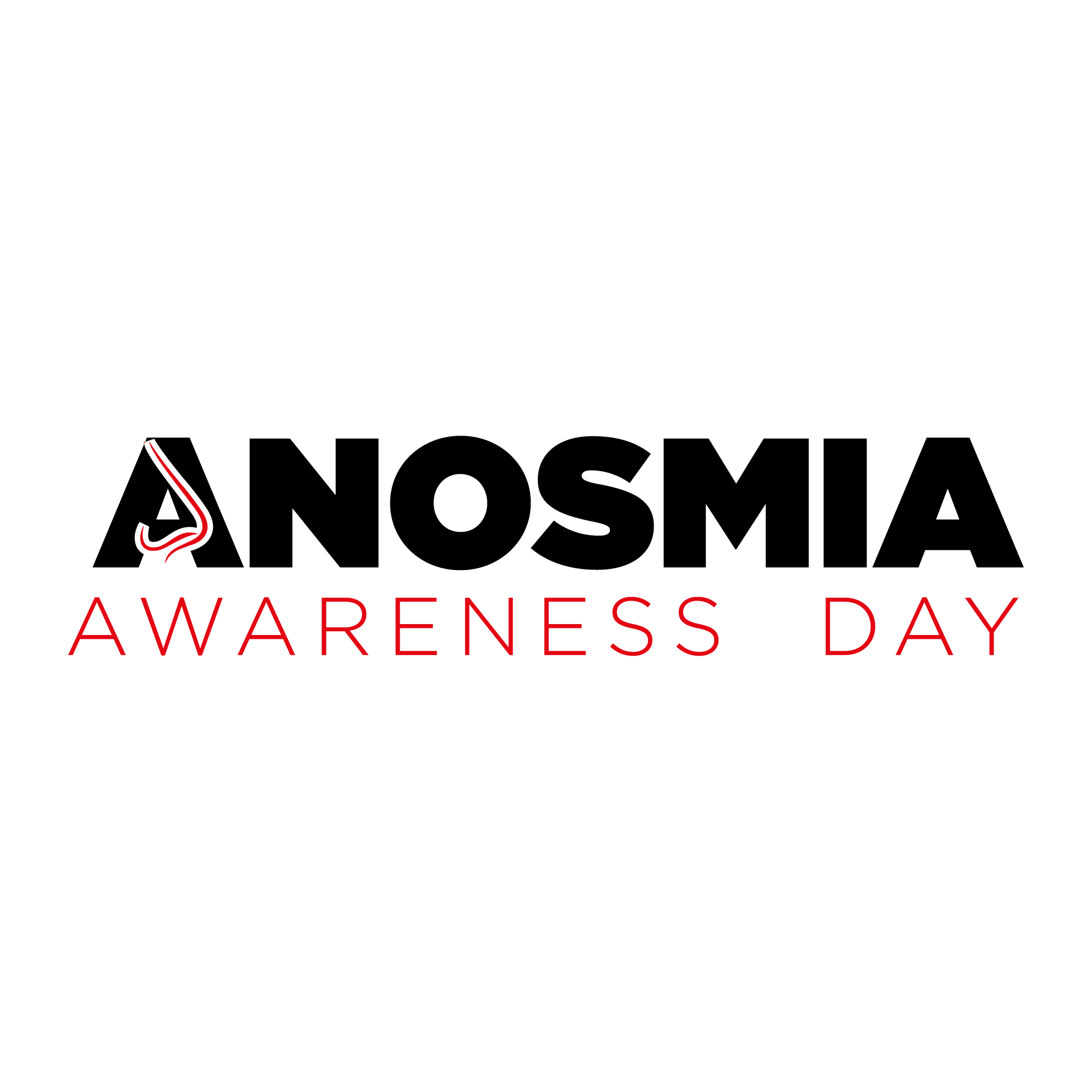
Anosmia Awareness Day Logo

Anosmia Awareness Day is a day to spread awareness about anosmia (an-OHZ-me-uh), the loss of the sense of smell. It takes place each year on February 27.

== Reason ==
Proponents of this event suggest that since there are relatively fewer visible and practical difficulties associated with olfactory disorders than with visual or auditory impairments, the nature of olfactory dysfunction and its consequences for an individual's safety and quality of life are not widely understood. Anosmia Awareness Day aims to expose this situation, push for the development of successful treatments, and inform the general public about the serious impact that anosmia can have on a person's life. People with anosmia have been shown to be susceptible to dangerous situations such as gas leaks, fires, hazardous chemical vapors, and ingesting spoiled food. Additionally, people with smell loss can also experience difficulty with eating due to the close relationship between smell and taste. Studies also indicate that some individuals develop depression in response to feelings of social isolation, fears regarding safety and personal odor management, and a diminished connection to pleasure, emotion, and memory.

== History ==
Anosmia Awareness Day was first launched on February 27, 2012, by a person with olfactory dysfunction, through a Facebook event page that established the date and the practice of wearing red to show support for the cause. Subsequently, smell and taste centers (like The Monell Center in Philadelphia, Pennsylvania) and charities (like Fifth Sense in the United Kingdom) have thrown their support behind the event, linking it to research and educational initiatives aimed at patients, doctors, and the general public. Fifth Sense, a UK-based charity that provides support and information to people with smell and taste disorders, has connected Anosmia Awareness Day to its international online awareness and fundraising campaign called #LongLostSmell.

== See also ==
- Anosmia Foundation
