= Hyperosmia =

Heightened sense of smell

Hyperosmia is an increased olfactory acuity (heightened sense of smell), usually caused by a lower threshold for odor. This perceptual disorder arises when there is an abnormally increased signal at any point between the olfactory receptors and the olfactory cortex. The causes of hyperosmia may be genetic, hormonal, or environmental. Hyperosmia has been found in people who have Addison's Disease, suffer from head injury, or sudden drug withdrawal.

== Causes ==
=== Genetics ===
A study by Menashe et al. has found that individuals with a single nucleotide polymorphism variant in the OR11H7P pseudogene have a lower receptor activation threshold for isovaleric acid. These individuals are hyperosmic for this single odorant.

Another study by Keller et al. has found that people with the intact human odorant receptor OR7D4 are more sensitive to androstenone and androstadienone and thus find them unpleasant (individuals with the semi-functional OR7D4 have two non-synonymous single nucleotide polymorphisms in the OR7D4 pseudogene, resulting in two amino acid substitutions). There has not yet been extensive research into the genetic background of those with general hyperosmia, rather than for just a single odorant.

=== Environmental ===
There has not been extensive research into environmental causes of hyperosmia, but there are some theories of some possible causes.

In a study by Atianjoh et al., it has been found that amphetamines decrease levels of dopamine in the olfactory bulbs of rodents. On this basis, it has been hypothesized that amphetamine use may cause hyperosmia in rodents and humans, but further research is still needed. Anecdotal support for the belief that amphetamines may cause hyperosmia comes from Oliver Sacks's account of a patient (who he later revealed to be himself) with a heightened sense of smell after taking amphetamines.

It has been observed that the inhalation of hydrocarbons can cause hyperosmia, most likely due to the destruction of dopaminergic neurons in the olfactory bulb.

Methotrexate, administered in the treatment of psoriasis, has been known to cause hyperosmia, and may be more likely to do so in patients with a history of migraines. However, this is only an observation and not part of a study; therefore, it is yet to be verified.

Rebound from Benzodiazepine dependence has been reported to introduce new sensory disturbance symptoms, including hyperosmia. These symptoms may occur as part of the broader sensory and neurological changes associated with benzodiazepine withdrawal and may resolve as withdrawal symptoms subside

== Treatment ==
If the cause(s) is/are environmental, normal olfactory acuity will usually return over time, even if it is left undiagnosed or untreated. Hyperosmic individuals may need to avoid exposure to strong odorants for a period of time if the sensation becomes unbearable. Dopamine antagonists such as butyrophenones or thioridazine hydrochloride were used to treat hyperosmia, but were later discontinued due to undesirable side effects. Anecdotal treatments have shown promise that have previously been used to prevent epilectic seisures, such as carbamazepine or sodium valproate, in a controlled manner to limit the side effects

== See also ==
- Benzodiazepine withdrawal syndrome
- Hyposmia
- Multiple chemical sensitivity
- Olfaction
- Parosmia
- Phantosmia
