= Bifrontal craniotomy =

- Specialty: Oncology

Bifrontal craniotomy is a surgical process which is used to target different tumors or malfunctioning areas of the brain.
