= University of Pennsylvania Smell Identification Test =

Test of a person's olfactory system

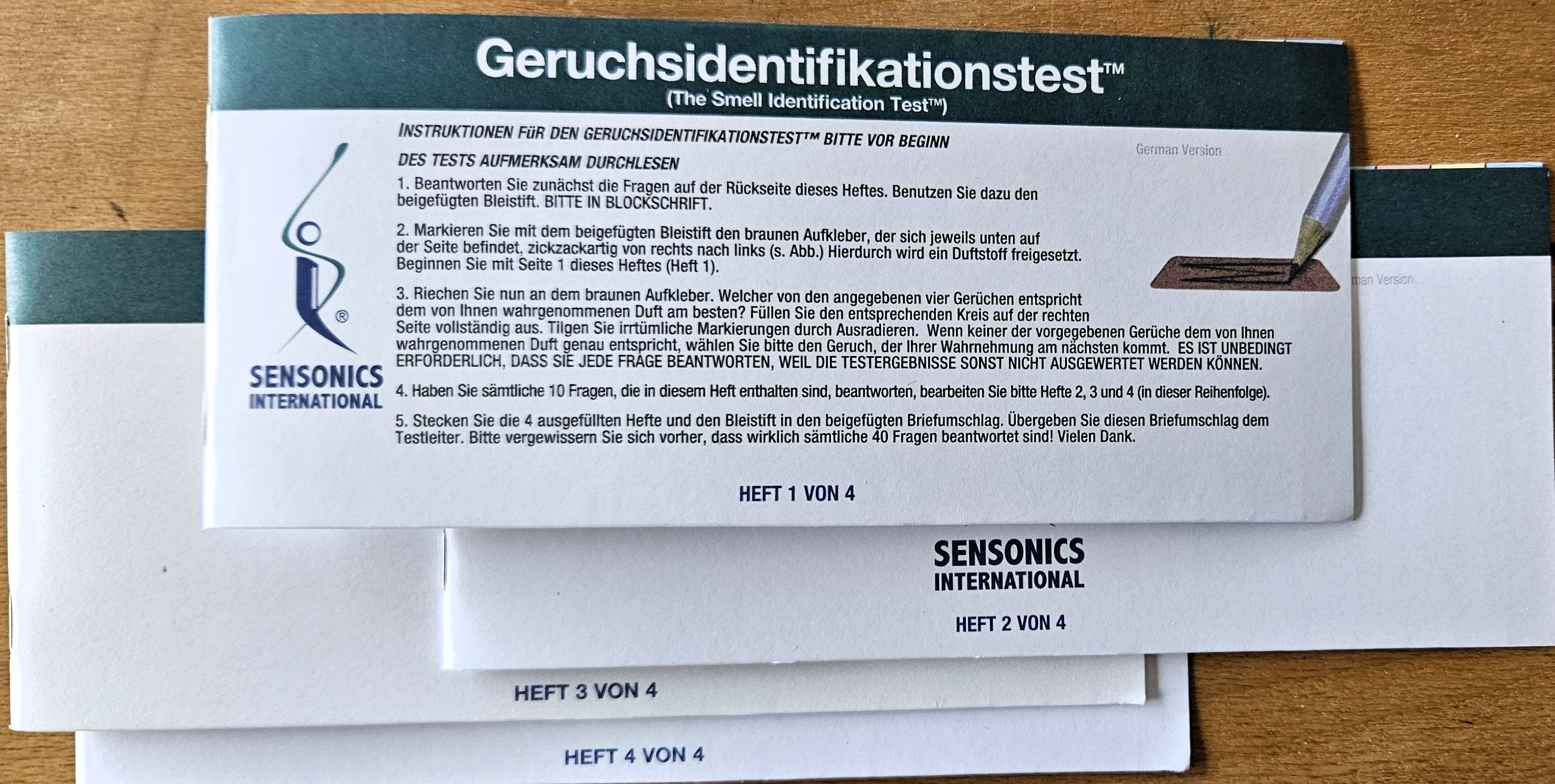
Sample of the UPSIT (German edition)

The University of Pennsylvania Smell Identification Test (UPSIT) is a test that is commercially available for smell identification to test the function of an individual's olfactory system. Known for its accuracy among smell identification tests it is considered to be one of the most reliable (r = .94) and trusted.

UPSIT was created by University of Pennsylvania professor of psychology and otorhinolaryngology and physician Richard Doty. Doty is also the director of the University of Pennsylvania's Smell and Taste Center. The test has a secondary purpose as a self-examination test in the diagnosis of many diseases including Parkinson's disease and Alzheimer's. The original test has been altered in several ways to be useful in numerous languages and cultures. There are also several trends that are found when UPSIT is administered based on demographics such as age, gender, history of smoking and other characteristics.

== Format ==
The UPSIT is a measurement of the individual's ability to detect odors at a suprathreshold level. The test is usually administered in a waiting room and takes only a few minutes. The test has a total of 40 questions and consists of four different 10-page booklets. On each page, there is a different scratch and sniff strip which are embedded with a microencapsulated odorant. There is also a four-choice multiple choice question on each page. The scents are released using a pencil. After each scent is released, the patient smells the strip and detects the odor from the four choices. There is an answer column on the back of the test booklet, and the test is scored out of 40 items. The score is compared to scores in a normative database from 4000 normal individuals; this tells the level of absolute smell function. The score also indicates how the patient does in accordance to their age group and gender. The test is occasionally judged to have an American cultural bias. There have been British, Chinese, French, German, Italian, Korean, and Spanish UPSIT versions made. There are also the Brief (Cross-Cultural) Smell Identification Test, as well as the Scandinavian Odor Identification Test.

== Demographics ==
In general, women have a better sense of smell than men do. This advantage can be observed as early as 4 years of age. This is evidenced by several cultures. This superiority in women also increases with age. Overall, women have a higher functioning olfactory system than men do starting from a young age. With the increase in age, there is an increased loss of the olfactory function. On average, individuals begin to lose function of their olfactory system by the age of 65. Of the individuals who do suffer a loss of olfactory function, half of the losses begin between the ages of 65 and 80. Three-quarters of these occur after the age of 80.

This plays a role in diagnosing Alzheimer's. Genetics have been found to play a significant role in the ability of one's olfactory system as well. If an individual does suffer from olfactory dysfunction, it is five times more likely that their first order relatives will also suffer from olfactory dysfunction. Another major factor in a decrease of olfactory function is smoking. It can take years for past smokers to regain their presmoking olfactory function. Occasionally it is even impossible for individuals to regain this level in its entirety. The length of time it can take for smokers to regain this level depends on the duration and intensity of their smoking habits. The olfactory system can be compromised in several environments. This includes large urban cities and certain industries, for example paper and chemical manufacturing.

== Diagnosis ==
There are many central nervous system disorders that are associated with olfactory dysfunction. Most of these dysfunctions classify as degenerative neuropsychiatric disorders. Some of these diseases are: Alzheimer's disease, Parkinson's disease, Huntington's disease, Korsakoff's psychosis, schizophrenia, congenital anosmia, head trauma, brain tumors, acquired immunodeficiency syndrome (AIDS), and multiple sclerosis.

=== Alzheimer's ===
UPSIT has been used to detect Alzheimer's (AD). Smell loss can be a very early sign of detecting AD. It has been suggested that AD affects odor identification and odor detection, this shows that AD patients have more trouble performing higher olfactory tasks that involve specific cognitive processes. During a functional magnetic resonance imaging (fMRI) study, blood oxygen level-dependent was found more strongly in control patients than AD patients, who showed a weaker signal. It has also been found through several studies that olfactory function and cognition correlates to the severity of AD. Therefore, UPSIT is a very good clinical test to be able to determine the severity of AD. During AD, a patient's olfactory bulb, amygdala and temporal cortices are affected. There is also severe nerve cell loss.

=== Parkinson's disease ===
UPSIT is also used to diagnose Parkinson's disease (PD). Smell dysfunction occurs in 90% of cases with PD. After the commercial release of UPSIT, there have been many studies published that have shown olfactory dysfunction in patients with PD. After it was discovered that smell tests can differentiate PD from progressive supranuclear palsy, essential tremor, and parkinsonism induced by MPTP, many studies were undertaken. It has been shown that the olfactory bulb is one of the two main regions where PD seems to begin. In families where there are individuals with PD, UPSIT can be used to predict whether other first degree relatives will also develop PD. It has been discovered that multiple factors contribute to the development of PD-related olfactory dysfunction. As with AD, the UPSIT score can also determine the severity of PD. But people develop various levels of olfactory dysfunction. The disorders with the olfactory dysfunction are those with the most pathology, such as PD and AD.
