= Anosmia =

Inability to smell

- Other names: Loss of smell, smell blindness, odor blindness
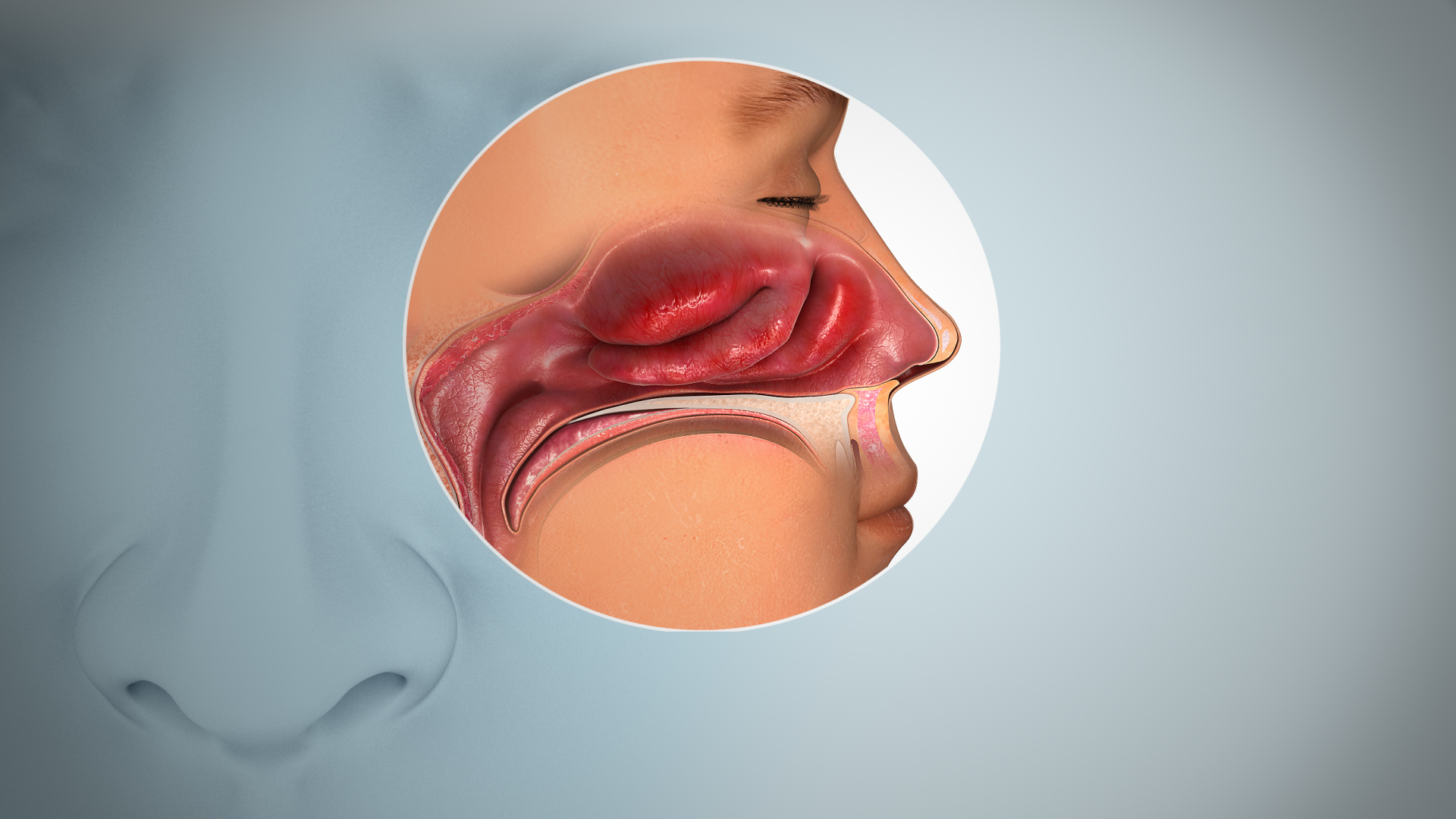
- Inflamed nasal mucosa causing anosmia
- Pronunciation: /ænˈɒzmiə/
- Specialty: Otorhinolaryngology
- Types: Partial, total

Anosmia, also known as smell blindness, is the lack of ability to detect one or more smells. Anosmia may be temporary or permanent. It differs from hyposmia, which is a decreased sensitivity to some or all smells.

Anosmia can be categorized into acquired anosmia and congenital anosmia. Acquired anosmia develops later in life due to various causes, such as upper respiratory infections, head trauma, or neurodegenerative diseases. In contrast, congenital anosmia is present from birth and is typically caused by genetic factors or developmental abnormalities of the olfactory system. While acquired anosmia may have potential treatments depending on the underlying cause, such as medications or surgery, congenital anosmia currently has no known cure, and management focuses on safety precautions and coping strategies.

Anosmia can be due to a number of factors, including inflammation of the nasal mucosa, blockage of nasal passages, or destruction of temporal lobular tissue. Anosmia stemming from sinus inflammation is due to chronic mucosal changes in the lining of the paranasal sinus and in the middle and superior turbinates.

When anosmia is caused by inflammatory changes in the nasal passageways, it is treated simply by reducing inflammation. It can be caused by chronic meningitis and neurosyphilis that would increase intracranial pressure over a long period of time, and, in some cases, by ciliopathy, including ciliopathy due to primary ciliary dyskinesia.

The term derives from the Neo-Latin anosmia, based on Ancient Greek ἀν- (an-) + ὀσμή (osmḗ 'smell'; another related term, hyperosmia, refers to an increased ability to smell). Some people may be anosmic for one particular odor, a condition known as "specific anosmia". The absence of the sense of smell from birth is known as congenital anosmia.

In the United States, 3% of people aged over 40 are affected by anosmia.

Anosmia is a common symptom of COVID-19 and can persist as long COVID.

== Signs and symptoms ==
Anosmia can have a number of harmful effects. People with sudden onset anosmia may find food less appetizing, though congenital anosmics rarely complain about this, and none report a loss in weight. Loss of smell can also be dangerous because it hinders the detection of gas leaks, fire, chemical spills, noxious fumes, and spoiled food. Misconceptions of anosmia as trivial, and lack of awareness regarding congenital anosmia, can make it more difficult for a patient to receive the same types of medical aid as someone who has lost other senses, such as hearing or sight. This matters greatly since scent detection assistance animals aren't commonly trained in public programs for individuals in the same way guide dogs are for blind and deaf individuals seeking assistance.

Congenital Anosmia has inherently less research available due to many studies focusing on causes of acquired anosmia are more publicly relevant and readily available like those discussing dental and facial trauma.

Many experience one sided loss of smell, often as a result of minor head trauma. This type of anosmia is normally only detected if both of the nostrils are tested separately. Using this method of testing each nostril separately will often show a reduced or even completely absent sense of smell in either one nostril or both, something which is often not revealed if both nostrils are simultaneously tested.

Losing an established and sentimental smell memory (e.g. the smell of grass, of the grandparents' attic, of a particular book, of loved ones, or of oneself) has been known to cause feelings of depression.

Loss of the ability to smell may lead to the loss of libido, but this usually does not apply to those with olfactory dysfunction at birth.

Some individuals with congenital anosmia, or anosmia caused in early childhood, report that they pretended to be able to smell as children for a variety of reasons including:

- They believed smelling was something that older/mature people could do; leading some to believe they may grow the ability to sense smell once older/past puberty.
- They did not understand the concept of smelling but did not want to appear different from others
- They believed they could sense smell due to misinterpreting information learned in childhood regarding what scents and smell genuinely were till otherwise informed in relevant circumstances - For example, when unable to detect smoke or noxious odours that others are unable to tolerate the scent of
- They believed that it was a skill based sense that could be practiced; similar to training scent detection dogs

As children get older, they often realize and report to their parents/guardians that they do not actually possess a sense of smell, often to the surprise of their parents, but not always.

Some children try to inform parents/guardians that they cannot sense scents during their youth. Not all youth who report the condition are believed, and how a parent responds can greatly influence how a child perceives the entire concept of scent afterwards; including whether they share it with others again. It's not unheard of for children to be punished for reporting the disability; commonly due to adults considering it childish lies which in turn can cause children to repress the knowledge till older/when they feel capable of advocating the legitimacy of their disability in conversation.

Poor memory retention; an ability to taste, but inability to experience flavors; migraine reactions to chemical aerosols/perfumes; accidental exposure to undetected gases; poor environmental memory; impacts on personal hygiene maintenance; are some symptoms reported by some congenital anosmics .

== Causes ==
A temporary loss of smell can be caused by a blocked nose or infection. In contrast, a permanent loss of smell may be caused by death of olfactory receptor neurons in the nose or by brain injury in which there is damage to the olfactory nerve or damage to brain areas that process smell (see olfactory system). The lack of the sense of smell at birth, usually due to genetic factors, is referred to as congenital anosmia. Family members of the patient with congenital anosmia are often found with similar histories; though not always; this suggests that the anosmia may follow an autosomal dominant pattern. Anosmia may very occasionally be an early sign of a degenerative brain disease such as Parkinson's disease and Alzheimer's disease.

Another specific cause of permanent loss could be from damage to olfactory receptor neurons because of use of certain types of nasal spray; i.e., those that cause vasoconstriction of the nasal microcirculation. To avoid such damage and the subsequent risk of loss of smell, vasoconstricting nasal sprays should be used only when absolutely necessary and then for only a short amount of time. Non-vasoconstricting sprays, such as those used to treat allergy-related congestion, are safe to use for prescribed periods of time. Anosmia can also be caused by nasal polyps. These polyps are found in people with allergies, histories of sinusitis, and family history. Individuals with cystic fibrosis often develop nasal polyps.

Amiodarone is a drug used in the treatment of arrhythmias of the heart. A clinical study demonstrated that the use of this drug induced anosmia in some patients. Although rare, there was a case in which a 66-year-old male was treated with amiodarone for ventricular tachycardia. After the use of the drug he began experiencing olfactory disturbance, however after decreasing the dosage of amiodarone, the severity of the anosmia decreased accordingly, suggesting a relationship between use of amiodarone to the development of anosmia.

=== COVID-19-related anosmia ===
Chemosensory disturbances, including loss of smell or taste, are the predominant neurological symptom of COVID-19. As many as 80% of COVID-19 patients exhibit some change in chemesthesis, including smell. Loss of smell has also been found to be more predictive of COVID-19 than all other symptoms, including fever, cough, or fatigue, based on a survey of 2 million participants in the UK and US. Google searches for "smell", "loss of smell", "anosmia", and other similar terms increased since the early months of the pandemic, and strongly correlated with increases in daily cases and deaths. Research into the mechanisms underlying these symptoms is currently ongoing.

Many countries list anosmia as an official COVID-19 symptom, and some have developed "smell tests" as potential screening tools.

In 2020, the Global Consortium for Chemosensory Research, a collaborative research organization of international smell and taste researchers, formed to investigate loss of smell and related chemosensory symptoms.

==== Decision-making in COVID-19 patients ====
Studies have indicated that patients who presented with anosmia during the acute phase of COVID-19 are more likely to develop changes in decision-making, exhibiting more impulsive responses, which are associated with functional and structural brain changes.

=== Possible causes ===
- Upper respiratory tract infection (such as sinusitis, the common cold)
- COVID-19
- Nasal polyps
- Idiopathic hypogonadotropic hypogonadism
- Hypothyroidism
- Head trauma, damage to the ethmoid bone
- Dementia with Lewy bodies
- Tumors of the frontal lobe
- Antibiotics
- Fibromyalgia
- Multiple sclerosis
- Exposure to hydrogen sulfide (H_{2}S) by paralysis of the olfactory nerve.
- Hypoglycaemia
- Diabetes
- Asthma or allergy
- Hayfever
- Chronic obstructive pulmonary disease (COPD)
- Long term alcoholism
- Cushing's syndrome
- Exposure to a chemical that burns the inside of the nose
- Stroke
- Epilepsy
- Radiation therapy to the head and neck
- Liver or kidney disease
- Parkinson's disease
- Alzheimer's disease
- Toxins (especially acrylates, methacrylates and cadmium)
- Old age
- Kallmann syndrome
- Primary ciliary dyskinesia
- Post-perfusion syndrome
- Laryngectomy with permanent tracheostomy
- Esthesioneuroblastoma is an exceedingly rare cancerous tumor that originates in or near the olfactory nerve. Symptoms are anosmia (loss of sense of smell) often accompanied by chronic sinusitis.
- Intranasal drug use
- Aspirin-exacerbated respiratory disease, also known as Samter's triad
- Foster Kennedy syndrome
- Cadmium poisoning
- Smoking
- Neurotropic virus
- Schizophrenia
- Pernicious anemia
- Zinc deficiency
- Bell's Palsy or nerve paralysis and damage
- Idiopathic intracranial hypertension
- Suprasellar meningioma
- Refsum's disease
- Adrenergic agonists or withdrawal from alpha blockers (vasoconstriction)
- Sarcoidosis
- Zinc-based intranasal cold products, including remedies labelled as "homeopathic"
- Chronic atrophic rhinitis
- Paget's disease of bone
- Cerebral aneurysm
- Granulomatosis with polyangiitis
- Primary amoebic meningoencephalitis
- Myasthenia gravis
- Snakebite
- Idiopathic anosmia (cause cannot be determined)

== Diagnosis ==
Diagnosis begins with a detailed history, including possible related injuries, such as upper respiratory infections or head injury. The examination may involve nasal endoscopy for obstructive factors such as polyps or swelling. A nervous system examination is performed to see if the cranial nerves are affected. On occasion, after head traumas, there are people who have unilateral anosmia. The sense of smell should be tested individually in each nostril.

Cases of congenital anosmia may remain unreported and undiagnosed. Because the disorder is present from birth, the individual may have little or no understanding of the sense of smell, remaining unaware of the disability as a cause for any deficits. It may also lead to reduction of appetite.

== Treatment ==
Though anosmia caused by brain damage cannot be treated, anosmia caused by inflammatory changes in the mucosa may be treated with glucocorticoids. Reduction of inflammation through the use of oral glucocorticoids such as prednisone, followed by long term topical glucocorticoid nasal spray, would easily and safely treat the anosmia. A prednisone regimen is adjusted based on the degree of the thickness of mucosa, the discharge of oedema and the presence or absence of nasal polyps. However, the treatment is not permanent and may have to be repeated after a short while. Together with medication, pressure of the upper area of the nose must be mitigated through aeration and drainage.

Anosmia caused by a nasal polyp may be treated by steroidal treatment or removal of the polyp.

Although very early in development, gene therapy has restored a sense of smell in mice with congenital anosmia when caused by ciliopathy. In this case, a genetic condition had affected cilia in their bodies which normally enabled them to detect air-borne chemicals, and an adenovirus was used to implant a working version of the IFT88 gene into defective cells in the nose, which restored the cilia and allowed a sense of smell.

== Epidemiology ==
In the United States, 3% of people aged over 40 are affected by anosmia.

In 2012, smell was assessed in persons aged 40 years and older with rates of anosmia/severe hyposmia of 0.3% at age 40–49 rising to 14.1% at age 80+. Rates of hyposmia were much higher: 3.7% at age 40–49 and 25.9% at 80+.

== Famous people with anosmia ==
- Kathy Clugston, British radio presenter
- Ben Cohen of Ben and Jerry's
- Perrie Edwards, singer of Little Mix
- Lorenzo de' Medici, 15th-century ruler of Florence
- Bill Pullman, American actor
- Jason Sudeikis, American actor
- Simon Tatham, British computer programmer
- William Wordsworth, poet

== See also ==
- Ageusia, the loss of the sense of taste
- Anosmia Awareness Day
- Congenital anosmia
- Olfactory fatigue, the habituation of the sense of smell to a particular odor or odors
- Parosmia
- Phantosmia
- Zicam, a medicine that caused some users to permanently lose their sense of smell
