= Parosmia =

Dysfunction with smell detection

- Other names: Troposmia
- Specialty: Otorhinolaryngology
- Symptoms: Inability to correctly identify an odor's "natural" smell

Parosmia (from the Greek παρά pará and ὀσμή osmḗ "smell") is a qualitative olfactory disorder that is characterized by distortion in the brains odor detection with a smell stimulus; as opposed to phantosmia which is a distortion without stimulus. The natural odor is usually transformed into an unpleasant aroma, typically a burned, rotting, fecal, or chemical smell. The condition was rare and little-researched until 2020 when it became more prevalent as a side effect of COVID-19.

== Causes ==
There are numerous diseases with which parosmia is associated. In a case study, Frasnelli et al. examined five patients that endured parosmia or phantosmia, most as a result of upper respiratory tract infections (URTIs). It is hypothesized that URTIs can result in parosmia because of damage to olfactory receptor neurons (ORNs). The condition has been linked to coronavirus disease 2019 as a rare side effect. Common triggers in COVID-19 related parosmia include coffee, chocolate, meat, onion, and toothpaste. Exposure to harmful solvents has also been linked to parosmia specifically by damaging ORNs. Damage to these neurons could render them unable to correctly encode a signal representing a particular odor, which would send an incorrect signal to the olfactory bulb. This miscommunication, in turn, leads to the signal triggering a different smell than the stimulating odor, and thus the patient cannot sync the input and output odors. Damage to ORNs describes a peripheral defect in the pathway, but there are also instances where damage to the processing center in the brain can lead to distorted odors.

Different types of head trauma could also lead to dysfunctions that relate to what the afflicted brain area controls. In humans, the olfactory bulb is located on the inferior side of the brain. Physical damage to this area would alter how the area processes information in a variety of ways, but there are also diseases that can alter how this area works. If the part of the brain that interprets these input signals is damaged, then a distorted output is possible. That damage would also lead to parosmia. Temporal lobe epilepsy has led to cases of parosmia, but these were only temporary; the onset of parosmia was a seizure, and it typically lasted a week or two after. Parosmia is sometimes associated with Parkinson's disease. Although the specific pathway is undetermined, the lack of dopamine has resulted in documented cases of parosmia and phantosmia.

== Diagnosis ==
One method used to diagnose parosmia is the University of Pennsylvania Smell Identification Test (UPSIT). "Sniffin' Sticks" are another diagnostic method. These techniques can help deduce whether a specific case of parosmia is attributed to just one stimulating odor or if there is a group of odors that will elicit the displaced smell. In one case studied by Frasnelli et al. certain smells, specifically coffees, cigarettes, onions, and perfumes, induced a "nauseating" odor for the patient, which was artificial and unrelated to a known smell. In another case study cited in the same paper, a woman had parosmia in one nostril but not the other. Medical examination including MRI did not reveal any abnormalities; however the parosmia in this case was degenerative, getting worse in time. The authors report that cases of parosmia can predict regeneration of olfactory senses.

== Pathophysiology ==
How Parosmia develops is still a mystery to researchers but there are two primary hypotheses of it's origin: Central and Peripheral.

=== Central Hypothesis ===
The central hypothesis suggests that parosmia is caused by abnormalities in how central olfactory structures like olfactory bulbs process signals resulting in an altered sense of smell. Another theory related to the central hypothesis is emphatic firing where the intracranial neurons "short-circuit" causing changes in scents.

=== Peripheral Hypothesis ===
The peripheral hypothesis was first described in 1918 and is a more widespread theory. It suggests that parosmia is caused by olfactory neurons regenerating abnormally after being damaged. essentially, olfactory neurons become "mis-wired" and send signals in ways that result in an incomplete picture of olfactory information.

== Treatment ==
Symptoms of most patients afflicted with parosmia decrease over time. Although there are instances of parosmia affecting patients for years, this is certainly not the majority of cases. There have been experimental treatments of parosmia with L-DOPA, but there are no other current treatments except inducing anosmia or hyposmia to the point that the odors are negligible.

== See also ==
- Phantosmia, perceiving smells not objectively present
