= Hyposmia =

Reduced ability to smell and to detect odors

Hyposmia, or microsmia, is a reduced ability to smell and to detect odors. A related condition is anosmia, in which no odors can be detected. Some of the causes of olfaction problems are allergies, nasal polyps, viral infections and head trauma. In 2012 an estimated 9.8 million people aged 40 and older in the United States had hyposmia and an additional 3.4 million had anosmia or severe hyposmia.

Hyposmia is considered a form of olfactory dysfunction and is more common than complete loss of smell. It may be temporary or long term depending on the underlying cause.

Hyposmia is relatively common, particularly in older adults, and population studies suggest that a significant portion of individuals over the age of 40 experience some degree of reduced olfactory function.

Hyposmia might be a very early sign of Parkinson's disease. Hyposmia is also an early and almost universal finding in Alzheimer's disease and dementia with Lewy bodies. Lifelong hyposmia could be caused by or comorbid with Kallmann syndrome or autism. Along with other chemosensory disturbances, hyposmia can be a key indicator of COVID-19.

In everyday life, a reduced sense of smell may affect appetite, food enjoyment, and the ability to detect environmental hazards such as smoke or gas leaks. Some individuals may also have difficulty recognizing familiar odors.

== Signs and symptoms ==
People with hyposmia typically experience a decreased sensitivity to odors, meaning that smells may appear faint or more difficult to identify. Because smell contributes significantly to taste perception, individuals may also notice that flavors seem dull or less distinct.

This reduced sensory input can lead to decreased appetite, changes in eating habits, or reduced enjoyment of food. In addition, hyposmia may be present safety concerns, as individuals may not detect warning odors such as smoke, natural gas, or spoiled food.

== Causes ==
These conditions may interfere with the ability of odor molecules to reach olfactory receptors or disrupt how olfactory signals are transmitted to and processed by the brain. For example, inflammation or blockage in the nasal passages can physically limit odor detection, while neurological factors may impair signal interpretation.

In some cases, hyposmia is related to changes in brain function rather than obstruction of the nasal passages. This may occur when the neural pathways responsible for processing smell are affected.

Upper respiratory infections are among the most common temporary causes of hyposmia, and many individuals recover their sense of smell as inflammation resolves. However, in some cases the condition may persist or the exact cause may remain unclear.

== Epidemiology ==
The National Health and Nutrition Examination Survey (NHANES) collected data on chemosensory function (taste and smell) in a nationally-representative sample of US civilian, non-institutionalized persons in 2012. Olfactory function was assessed on persons aged 40 years and older with an 8-item, odor identification test (Pocket Smell Tests, Sensonics, Inc., Haddon Heights, NJ). Odors included food odors (strawberry, chocolate, onion, grape), warning odors (natural gas, smoke) and household odors (leather, soap). Olfactory function score was based on the number of correct identifications. Prevalence (%) of anosmia/severe hyposmia (scores 0 to 3) was 0.3 at age 40–49 rising to 14.1 at age 80+. Prevalence of hyposmia (scores 4 to 5) was much higher: 3.7% at age 40–49 and 25.9% at 80+. Both were more prevalent in individuals of African descent than in those of Caucasian descent.

Chemosensory data were also collected in a larger NHANES sample in 2013–2014. The prevalence of smell disorder (scores 0–5 out of 8 correct) was 13.5% in persons aged 40 years and over. If the same prevalence occurred in 2016, an estimated 20.5 million persons 40 and over had hyposmia or anosmia. In addition multiple demographic socioeconomic, and lifestyle characteristics were assessed as risk factors for diminished smell. In statistical analyses, greater age and male sex, coupled with either black and/or non-Hispanic ethnicity, low family income, low educational attainment, high alcohol consumption (more than 4 drinks per day), and a history of asthma or cancer were independently associated with a greater prevalence of smell impairment.

== Diagnosis ==
Diagnosis of hyposmia is typically based on medical history and clinical evaluation. In some cases, standardized smell identification tests are used to assess a person's ability to detect and recognize odors. These tests help distinguish hyposmia from other olfactory disorders and may assist in identifying underlying causes.

== See also ==
- Dysosmia
- Hyperosmia
