= Francisco Delgado Jugo =

Venezuelan ophthalmologist (1830–1875)

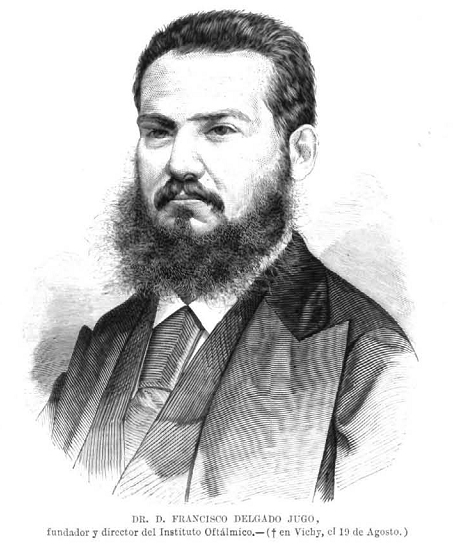
- Born: Francisco de Asís Delgado Jugo; October 1830; Maracaibo, Venezuela
- Died: August 19, 1875 (aged 44); Vichy, France
- Occupations: Ophthalmologist; Physician

Francisco Delgado Jugo (October 1830 – August 19, 1875) was a Venezuelan ophthalmologist.

== Biography ==
=== Early life and education ===
Francisco de Asís Delgado Jugo was born in Maracaibo, Venezuela in October 1830. He completed his early education in his hometown of Maracaibo.

After beginning his medical studies in Caracas, Venezuela, he went on to complete his doctorate in Lima, Peru at the University of Lima.

In 1850, he relocated to Paris, France and was invested as doctor by the University of Montpellier. He studied under French ophthalmologist Louis-Auguste Desmarres at his special ophthalmological clinic. He was later appointed head of the clinic.

Deciding to move to Spain in 1858, he settled in Madrid and established a clinic on Calle del Humilladero. He opened a free course in ophthalmology. Appointed by Julián Calleja y Sánchez, he directed the construction of the ophthalmology department at the Old Medicine School of San Carlos. He also taught Cayetano del Toro and Santiago de los Albitos.

=== Anthropological Society of Madrid ===
When Pedro González de Velasco founded the Anthropological Society of Madrid (Spanish: Sociedad Antropológica de la Madrid) in Spain, Delgado Jugo was appointed as the secretary on September 14, 1865. He held the general secretary position until 1873.

Delgado Jugo delivered a speech on December 31, 1865, for the opening of the 1866 academic year at the Matritense Medical-Surgical Academy.

On April 20, 1866, he was a member of The Spanish Abolition Society and involved in its early proceedings.

As a delegate of Madrid, he was appointed to the organizing committee of the International Medical Congress on June 5, 1866, resulting in the 1867 Exposition Universelle.

His practice was established on Calle de San Bernardo in Spain's capital. In 1868, he attended the International Congress of Anthropology and Prehistoric Archaeology held in England on August 20.

On April 18, 1869, he joined members of the Medical-Surgical Press of Madrid, including Pedro González de Velasco and Quintín Chiarlone, to discuss convening a general medical assembly.

As a delegate of the University of Madrid's Academy of Public Lectures, he attended a literary festival honoring Spanish novelist Miguel de Cervantes on April 23, 1869.

In October 1869, El Pabellon Medico reported that the Municipal Charity of Madrid launched a clinic for the poor with eye conditions, under the management of Delgado Jugo. The special consultation was located in the first aid center of the 6th district of Tetuán. By 1871, he worked for the Municipal Charity of Madrid (Spanish: Beneficencia Municipal de Madrid) within the city's second district of Arganzuela at an eye disease clinic.

Delgado Jugo worked on the Spanish version of German ophthalmologist Richard Liebreich's Atlas of Ophthalmoscopy, which was published in 1870, after the original 1863 edition. This translation expanded the knowledge of ophthalmoscopy in Spanish-speaking medical communities. Assisting Louis de Wecker on June 1, 1872, he translated Traité théorique et pratique des maladies des yeux into Spanish and provided original notes and engravings.

Amadeo I of Spain and Maria Vittoria dal Pozzo entrusted him to the directorship of the National Ophthalmological Institute (Spanish: Instituto Oftalmico), inaugurated in 1872, of which he was director until his death.

In London, England, from August 1 to August 3, 1872, he took part in the Fourth International Ophthalmological Congress.

On September 22, 1872, he signed a petition to the Senate in Madrid for the abolition of slavery in Cuba and Puerto Rico.

He was featured in the Spanish medical journal El Anfiteatro Anatómico Español in 1873. He gave a lecture on the history of corneal diseases on March 20, 1873, at the Medical-Surgical Athenaeum.

== Death ==
Francisco Delgado Jugo died in Vichy, France on August 19, 1875.
