= Juan Santos Fernández =

Cuban ophthalmologist (1847–1922)

- Born: Juan Santos Fernández y Hernández; July 22, 1847; Unión de Reyes, Matanzas Province, Captaincy General of Cuba, Spanish Empire
- Died: August 6, 1922 (aged 75); Havana, Cuba
- Education: University of Havana. Old Medicine School of San Carlos
- Occupation: Ophthalmologist
- Relatives: Francisco Maria Fernández (nephew)

Juan Santos Fernández (July 22, 1847 – August 6, 1922) was a Cuban ophthalmologist, hygienist, and writer who was an early contributor to the medical field of ophthalmology in Cuba.

== Biography ==
=== Early life and education ===
Juan Santos Fernández y Hernández was born on July 22, 1847 in Unión de Reyes, Matanzas Province, Spanish Cuba. He was the son of Desiderio Fernández.

In 1870, after his initial year at the University of Havana, his parents removed him from medical studies and sent him to Madrid, Spain. There, he attended the Old Medicine School of San Carlos and joined the Anthropological Society of Madrid, established in 1869. Eventually, he received his doctorate from the Colegio de San Carlos of Madrid (English: Old Medicine School of San Carlos) in 1872. His writings during this time included research on astigmatism.

=== Ophthalmology career ===
From 1872 to 1875, he trained in ophthalmologic surgery under Xavier Galezowski in Paris. Upon returning to Cuba in 1875, he began his practice at an eye disease clinic. He reportedly performed a successful eye operation on Military Governor Joaquín Jovellar's daughter in the mid-to-late 1870s.

==== Crónica Médico-Quirúrgica de La Habana ====
While back in Havana, Dr. Juan Santos Fernández founded a monthly medical journal, Crónica Médico-Quirúrgica de La Habana (English: Medical-Surgical Chronicle of Havana). Cuban Anthropologist Luis Montané Dardé served as a corresponding member of the newspaper's editorial board.

==== Cuban Academy of Sciences ====
Juan Santos Fernández was admitted to Havana's Royal Academy of Medicine, Physics, and National Sciences (Spanish: Academia de Ciencias Médicas, Fisicas y Naturales de la Habana) (now Cuban Academy of Sciences). He was part of the Larrey Association, established in 1873. His 1875 research on eye diseases in Cuba was presented on May 14, 1876, at the Royal Academy of Medicine, Physics, and Natural Sciences. In the same year, a portrait and biography of him were published by the editorial board of El Anfiteatro Anatómico Español.

==== Cuban Anthropological Society ====
Santos Fernández founded the Anthropological Society of the Island of Cuba (Spanish: Sociedad Antropológica de la Isla de Cuba) on September 16, 1877, with the help of Dr. Luis Montané Dardé and Felipe Poey. The society focused on the Natural History of Man and related fields, inspired by the Anthropological Society of Madrid.

==== Laboratory of Antirabic Vaccination of Havana ====
In Havana on Prado Street, he founded a bacteriological laboratory, known as the Laboratory of Antirabic Vaccination of Havana, in 1887, in connection with his medical journal, La Crónica Médico-Quirúrgica de La Habana. The lab treated hydrophobia. He is recognized as the first to introduce the Pasteur treatment for rabies in America.

Upon being named an honorary fellow by the American Association of Obstetricians and Gynecologists in 1892, he shared his research titled Corneal Opacities in Fetal Eyes.

==== International Medical Congress ====
Santos Fernández was a member of the International Executive Committee at the first Pan-American Medical Congress in Washington, D.C., which took place in September 1893. Additionally, he served on the Spanish West Indies auxiliary committee.

In 1898, under the leadership of Santos Fernández, who was president of the Cuban Academy of Sciences, the institution formally lowered the Spanish flag following the Treaty of Paris. This gesture not only ended the academy's royal status but also symbolized the significant political changes occurring in Cuba as it moved toward independence.

At the 1900 International Medical Congress in Paris, France, the ophthalmologist presented his paper Enfermedades de los ojos en los negros y mulatos (English: Eye Illnesses of Blacks and Mulattos).

Serving as president of the International Sanitary Congress in February 1902, he welcomed delegates on February 17 at the Hotel Telégrafo in Havana and discussed recent developments in sanitary science. In March 1902, he made a formal request to Military Governor Leonard Wood on behalf of the academy, seeking necessary resources to address the tuberculosis crisis.

On January 2, 1903, he was appointed by President Tomás Estrada Palma as an honorary member of the Superior Sanitary Board of the Island of Cuba. Santos Fernández gave a speech at the International Medical Congress of Physicians, held in Madrid, in April 1903.

Santos Fernández published an article titled Posterior Crystalline Opacities After The Operation of Cataract in August 1905.

On June 13, 1908, he delivered a speech in Bolondrón, Matanzas, Cuba. Recognized by the American Academy of Ophthalmology and Otolaryngology in 1909, he presented his paper, Some Observations in Thirty-five Years of Service in Cuba Pertaining to Ophthalmology.

As the president of the Academy of Medical, Physical, and Natural Sciences of Havana, he served as the organization's delegate at the second Pan-American Scientific Congress in Washington, D.C., held on December 29, 1915. On January 7, 1916, his scientific paper titled Antirabic vaccination in Habana with statistics compared with those of other nations was presented to the conference.

In 1916, he was on the Board of directors of The Havana Athenaeum, a Scientific Literary and Art Society, serving as the second vice-president.

== Death ==
Juan Santos y Fernández died in Havana, Cuba on August 6, 1922.

== Honors ==
On January 18, 1927, the President signed a decree in Havana to create an institute for the blind under the name of Juan Santos Fernández Institute.
