= Anthropological Society of the Island of Cuba =

Cuban learned society for anthropology

- Formation: 1877
- Purpose: Anthropology
- Headquarters: Havana, Cuba
- Region served: Cuba
- Official language: Spanish

The Anthropological Society of the Island of Cuba (Spanish: Sociedad Antropológica de la Isla de Cuba) or The Cuban Anthropological Society was a learned society for anthropology in the 1870s. The Cuban Anthropological Society was founded by Dr. Juan Santos Fernández in 1877 in Havana, Cuba. Its purpose was to promote the study and advancement of the Natural history of Man and related sciences in Cuba.

== History ==
The Anthropological Society of the Island of Cuba was founded by Dr. Juan Santos Fernández in Havana, Cuba. It was modelled as the Cuban chapter of the Anthropological Society of Madrid, established by Dr. Pedro González de Velasco in the 1860s.

Dr. Santos Fernández, having received permission from the Spanish colonial government of Joaquín Jovellar y Soler, went on to establish the Society. The inaugural session was hosted in his apartments on Paseo del Prado, where the Society's foundations were laid. On September 16, 1877, the Cuban Anthropological Society elected its new governing board for the 1877–1878 term. According to official records the society was formally established on October 7,1877 and held its launching session in the building of the Royal Academy of Medical physical and Natural sciences of Havana.

Some of the founding members include Luis Montané Dardé, a former pupil of Paul Broca, and Cuban zoologist Felipe Poey. Monté presided over the Cuban Anthropological Society in 1877, before that, the Anthropology section of the Royal Academy of Medical, Physical, and Natural Sciences of Havana (now Cuban Academy of Sciences). Enrique José Varona was also once chairman of the Society. Additionally some other founding members include Antonio Mestre, who served as secretary, Juan Santos Fernandez who was one of the members mentioned in the society. The society gained a lot of notice for their scientific activities and their efforts to advance anthropology research throughout Cuba.

The first publication of its bulletin in Havana took place in 1885. The director issued a publication on behalf of the Members of the Society seeking Indian relics, notably aboriginal endocranium and authentic bones. In November 1885, the paper Les Crânes dits Déformé was presented to the Society in Havana, arguing that artificial cranial deformation was never practiced in the West Indies or on the continent. During the early expeditions materials collected became incorporated into the collections of the Royal academy. This helped expand cubas anthropological research resources at the end.

In the earlier years the Societys focus was to understand Cubas indigenous and colonial populations. Genetic studies shows an approximation of 33% native american ancestry while the remainder is between eurasionas and african descent.

== See also ==
- Anthropological Society of Madrid
- Anthropological Society of London
