= Cuban Neuroscience Center =

Research institute in Cuba

- Established: 1969
- Field of research: Neuroscience
- Director: Mitchell Valdes Sosa, Pedro Antonio Valdes-Sosa (Vicedirector and Founder)
- Location: Havana City, Cuba
- Affiliations: BioCubaFarma
- Website: www.cneuro.cu

The Cuban Neuroscience Center (CNEURO) is a research institute located in Playa, Havana City. It was founded in 1969 as one of the first groups in the world to use informatics for the analysis of the brain`s electrical activity. CNEURO was officially established in 1990 and is nowadays one of the BioCubaFarma institutions, that focuses on basic and applied research as well as the development of high technology in order to screen, diagnose and treat problems related to mental health. It has a DNV Healthcare accreditation.

== Research ==
CNEURO carries out research in several medical and scientific fields. Main activities include medical projects on social impact of disabilities caused by neural dysfunction, strategic neuroscience research, and the development of products, medical equipments, specialized software and other resources for the neurophysiologic diagnostic.

== Other activities ==
CNEURO coordinates the National Program in Science and Technology for neurosciences and neurobiology emerging technologies. It also develops care for the country`s National Network of Clinical Neurophysiology Laboratories (57 locations), and provides technical assistance services. CNEURO received post-doctoral students from Germany, Japan and Switzerland. Authorized by the Cuban Higher Education Ministry, it also developed a Neuroscience Master Program

The institute coordinates the National Cochlear Implant Program for deaf and deaf blind patients, that was developed by CNEURO in collaboration with institutions of the Ministry of Public Health and the Ministry of Higher Education. Furthermore, CNEURO contributes to a new patent portfolio in some countries such as United States and South Africa, and publishes a large amount of research in scientific magazines.
