= Civil Order of Alfonso XII =

Spanish State order named for King Alfonso XII

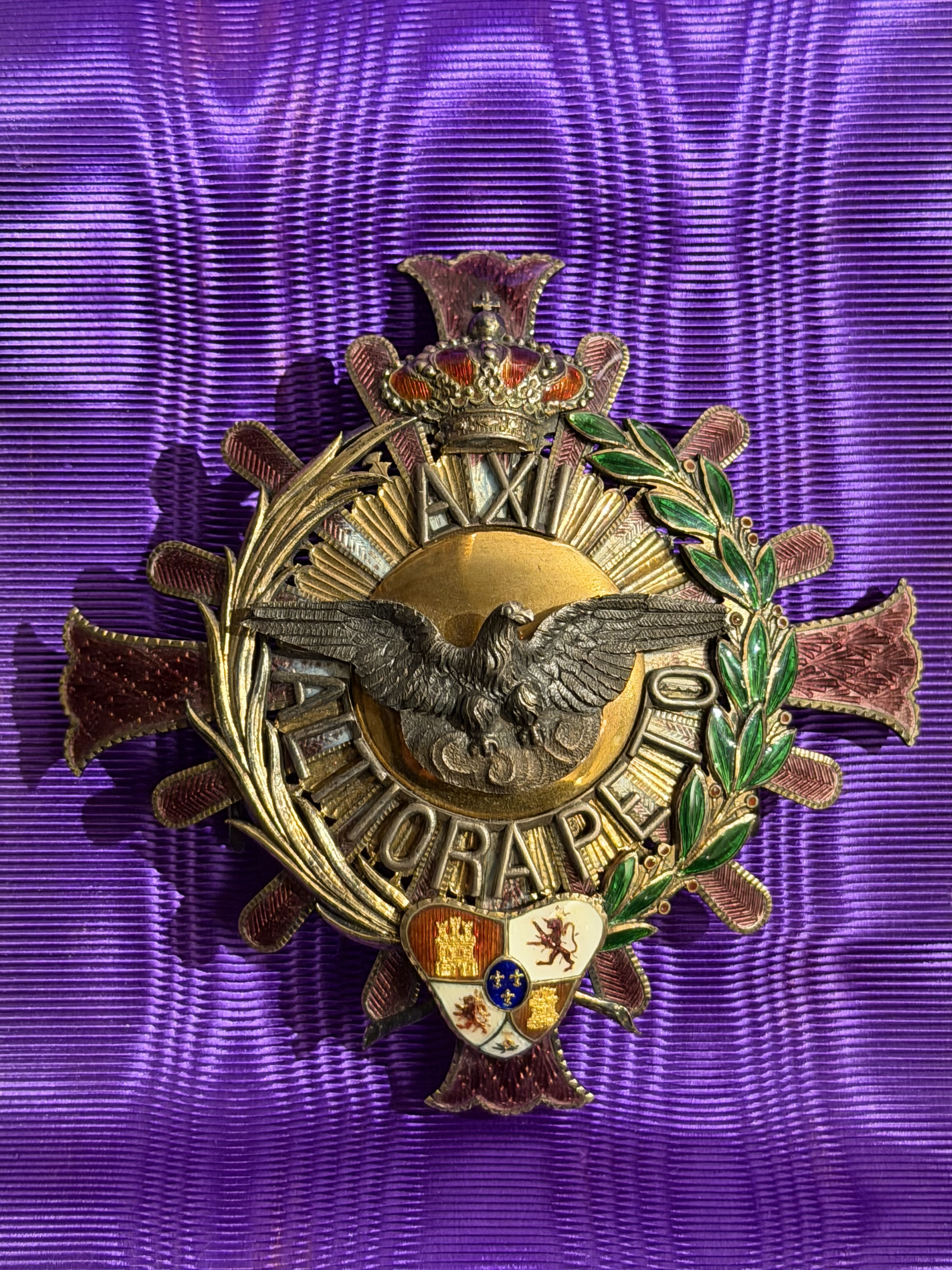
- Breast star of the Order
- Type: State order
- Established: 23 May 1902
- Country: Spain
- Motto: Altiora peto
- Status: Abolished 2 September 1988
- Founder: Alfonso XIII of Spain
- Grades: Grand Cross (Gran Cruz); Commander (Encomienda); Chevalier (Caballero)
- Ribbon of the Order

The Civil Order of Alfonso XII (Spanish: Orden Civil de Alfonso XII) was a Spanish honorific decoration named for King Alfonso XII (1857–1885). It was established by Royal Decree on 23 May 1902 to reward achievements in education, science, culture, teaching and research.

== History ==
According to Article 3 of the Royal Decree, the order is composed of three categories: Grand Cross (Spanish: Gran Cruz), Commander (Spanish: Encomienda), and Chevalier (Spanish: Caballero).

Beginning in 1939, the members of the Order could request their entry into the Civil Order of Alfonso X, the Wise.

Royal Decree 954/1988, of 2 September, finalized its replacement with the Civil Order of Alfonso X, the Wise, "adapting its norms to the social conditions of the present time and to the democratic principles on which the legal system is based."

== Selected recipients ==
- Mariano Benlliure
- Sarah Bernhardt
- Julián Calleja y Sánchez
- Francisco Codera
- Carlos Cortezo
- Marie Curie
- José Echegaray
- Cesáreo Fernández Duro
- Francisco Fernández y González
- Álvaro de Figueroa
- José García Barbón
- José Gómez de Arteche
- Teodoro Llorente Falcó
- Lucas Mallada
- Andrés Manjón
- Carolina Marcial Dorado
- Marcelino Menéndez y Pelayo
- Eugenio Montero Ríos
- José Moreno Carbonero
- José Morer
- Remigio Mugica
- The Orfeó Català
- José María de Pereda
- Benito Pérez Galdós
- Francisco Pradilla Ortiz
- Agustí Querol Subirats
- Santiago Ramón y Cajal
- Arthur Rubinstein
- Eduardo Saavedra
- Vicente Santamaría de Paredes
- Joaquín Sorolla
- Leonardo Torres Quevedo
- Juan Valera y Alcalá-Galiano
- Ricardo Velázquez Bosco
- Pedro Viteri

== See also ==
- Orders, decorations, and medals of Spain
