= Luis Montané Dardé =

Cuban physician and anthropologist (1849–1936)

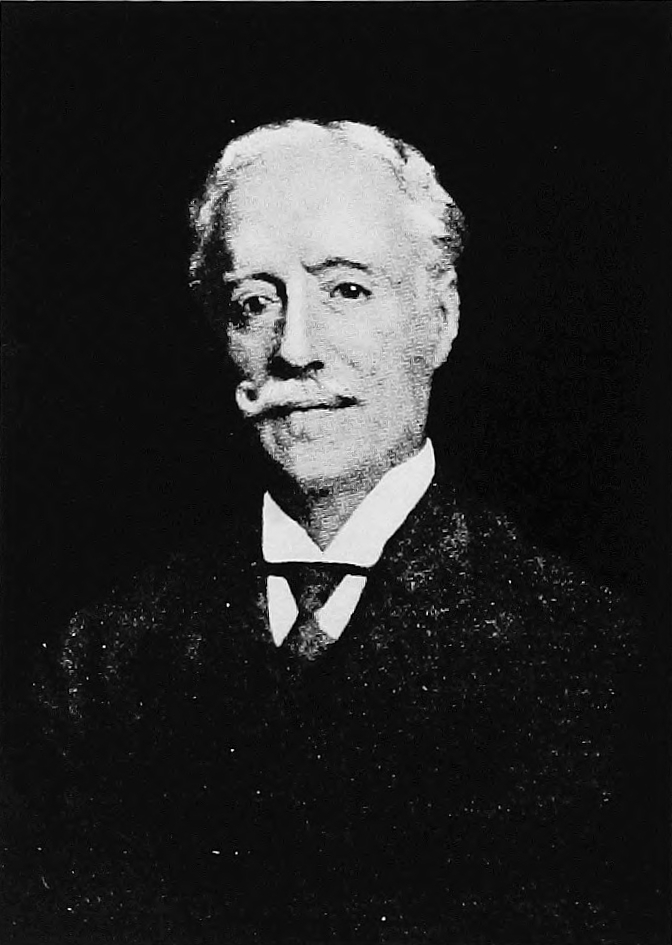
- Born: Luis Montané y Dardé; April 7, 1849; Havana, Captaincy General of Cuba, Spanish Empire
- Died: 1936 (aged 86–87); Havana, Cuba
- Education: French School of Anthropology
- Occupations: Physician; Anthropologist; Professor
- Awards: Legion of Honour

Luis Montané Dardé (April 7, 1849 – 1936) was a Cuban physician, anthropologist, and writer.

== Biography ==
=== Early life and education ===
Luis Montané y Dardé was born in Havana, Spanish Cuba on April 7, 1849. At two years old, his family relocated to France. He began his studies in Paris in 1867, studying under Medical anthropologist Paul Broca, Armand de Quatrefages, and Ernest Hamy, at the laboratory of anthropology at the École pratique des hautes études.

Following his education in Paris and medical revalidation in Barcelona, Spain, he became an assistant physician in the French Military amid the Franco-Prussian War of 1870. At this time, Montané joined the Anthropological Society of Paris. He later became President of the Paris Anthropological Society.

During the 1870s, he continued studies in Paris, France under Broca at the French School of Anthropology. He acquired an understanding of anthropology and performed investigations of the endocranium. By 1874, he became a Doctor of The Faculty of Medicine of Paris.

=== Scientific community ===
Upon returning to Cuba in 1874, he immersed himself in the Cuban scientific community. Montané contributed to Dr. Juan Santos Fernández's medical journal titled, Crónica Médico-Quirúrgica de La Habana (English: Medical-Surgical Chronicle of Havana), established in the following year.

==== Cuban Academy of Sciences ====
In 1875, Montané was admitted to Havana's Royal Academy of Medicine, Physics, and National Sciences (Spanish: Academia de Ciencias Médicas, Fisicas y Naturales de la Habana) (now Cuban Academy of Sciences). In 1876, he oversaw the newly created Anthropology section of the organization.

==== Cuban Anthropological Society ====
In 1877, Montané co-founded the Anthropological Society of the Island of Cuba (Spanish: Sociedad Antropológica de la Isla de Cuba) with Cuban ophthalmologist Juan Santos Fernández and Cuban naturalist Felipe Poey.

The medical journal The Lancet published his work A Calculus in the Bronchus in 1887.

==== Archaeology ====
Montané excavated a burial cave in Sancti Spiritus Province in 1888, and the findings were published in 1906.

In 1893, the U.S. National Museum acquired his archaeological work for the World's Columbian Exposition, showcasing photos of stone implements, carvings, pottery fragments, and human skulls discovered near Cape Maisí.

=== Career ===
==== Professor of Anthropology ====
Montané was appointed the first professor of Anthropology at the University of Havana in 1899, guiding its growth into a department. In September 1899, he participated in an examination of Gen. Antonio Maceo's skull with Anthropologist Carlos de la Torre and Jose Montalvo. The group published the scientific paper El cráneo de Antonio Maceo in 1900.

During the first U.S. Occupation of Cuba in December 1899, the Military Governor Leonard Wood assigned Dr. Montané as chairman of General Anthropology with Anthropometrical Exercises within the Faculty of Sciences at Havana University. He was assigned to the chair of the Anthropology department in the Faculty of Sciences for the 1900–1901 academic term. In 1903, he became the founding director of the Montané Anthropological Museum (Spanish: Museo Antropológico Montané) at the university.

Montané conducted an investigation in the Maisí region of Guantánamo Province in 1902.

He was tasked by the Gómez administration in 1910 to research the Banao hills in Sancti Spíritus Province, where ancient remains were discovered in the caves. Based on his findings at the primitive burial ground, he developed the scientific paper L'Homme Fossile Cubain (English: The Fossil Man of Cuba). The genus and species Montaneia anthropomorpha was established by Argentine naturalist Florentino Ameghino in 1911, derived from 16 teeth from a mandible found by Montané in the pre-Columbian cave.

In 1913, the anthropology professor presented a study titled Découverte des premières Sepultures Indiennes de Cuba at the Baird Auditorium in Washington, D.C.

By the mid-1910s, he was distinguished as a Knight of the Legion of Honor. He was also affiliated with the Society of Americanists of Paris and the Argentine Scientific Society as an associate member.

==== Second Pan-American Scientific Congress ====
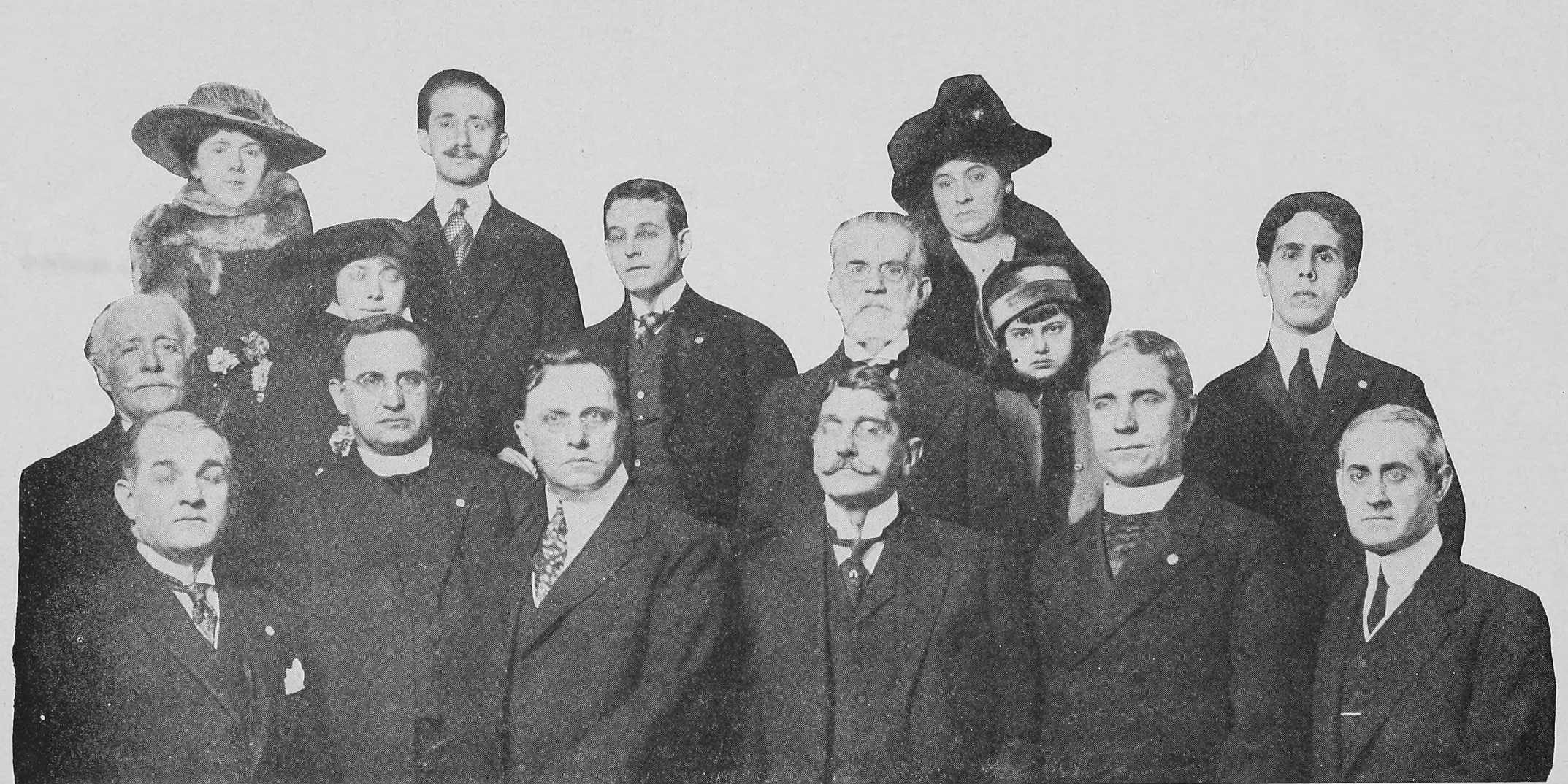
Cuban delegation to the Second Pan American Scientific Congress, December 1915

In 1914, the Government of the Republic of Cuba was invited by the U.S. Government to be officially represented at the Second Pan-American Scientific Congress which occurred in Washington, D.C. Dr. Montané was appointed to the Cuban representation by Cuban President Mario García Menocal as a delegate of the Havana University's Faculty of Sciences. On December 28, 1915, he acted as the chairman of the conference's anthropology proceedings held at the National Museum of Natural History. On January 3, 1916, he presented The Fossil Man of Cuba to the conference.

He held his position as the university's professor of General and Legal anthropology until 1919.

By 1922, Montané had conducted excavations in several caves of the island including Santiago and Puerto Príncipe and prepared a memoir on the subject. Many of these findings were showcased by the museum curator at the Museum of Anthropology at the University in Havana.

Montané attended the proceedings of the 21st International Congress of Americanists held at The Hague in August 1924.

== Death ==
Luis Montané y Darde died in Havana, Cuba in 1936.
