= Anthropological Society of Madrid =

Spanish learned society for anthropology

- Formation: 1865
- Purpose: Anthropology
- Headquarters: Madrid, Spain
- Region served: Spain
- Official language: Spanish

The Anthropological Society of Madrid (Spanish: Sociedad Antropológica de la Madrid) or The Spanish Anthropological Society was a learned society for anthropology in the 1860s. The Spanish Anthropological Society was founded by Dr. Pedro González de Velasco and inaugurated in 1865 in Madrid, Spain. It was established to contribute to the study and advancement of Anthropological Science in Europe.

== History ==
On 6 November 1864, a meeting coordinated by Dr. Velasco led to the appointment of an organizing committee composed of Matías Nieto, Manuel María José de Galdo, Ramón Torres Muñoz de Luna, Sandalio de Pereda, and Juan Vilanova. The organizing committee met on 14 May 1865 to officially found the Madrid Spanish Anthropological Society, which was then legally established by a royal edict on 16 May. Velasco's home on Calle de Atocha was used to hold its meetings. Dr. Francisco Delgado Jugo served as the secretary of the Society.

The society was closely associated with the Anthropological Society of London and in Paris. On the day of its inauguration, Dr. James Hunt, chairman of the Anthropological Society of London, announced the formation of the Anthropological Society at Madrid and pledged to forward all of their publications from inception. In 1877, an Anthropological Society of the Island of Cuba was founded by Dr. Juan Santos Fernández which was inspired by the Spanish chapter.

== See also ==
- Anthropological Society of London
- Anthropological Society of the Island of Cuba
- Museo Nacional de Antropología (Madrid)
