= Julián Calleja y Sánchez =

Spanish scientist (1836–1913)

Julián Calleja
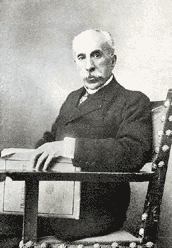
- Born: Julián Calleja y Sánchez; December 1, 1836; Madrid, Spain
- Died: April 13, 1913 (aged 76); Madrid, Spain
- Education: Central University of Madrid
- Occupations: Physician professor Politician
- Awards: Civil Order of Alfonso XII

Julián Calleja y Sánchez (December 1, 1836 – April 13, 1913) was a Spanish anatomist, professor, and politician.

== Biography ==
=== Early life and education ===
Julián Calleja y Sánchez was born in Madrid, Spain on December 1, 1836.

Calleja Sánchez studied medicine at the Central University of Madrid and in 1854 was taking the second year of Anatomy at the university. In 1856, Calleja secured the role of dissector assistant after passing a competitive examination, integral to the anatomy department. He delivered a speech at the Faculty of Medicine of the Central University upon receiving his medical degree on July 3, 1859.

=== Career ===
After graduating, he remained a dissector assistant in 1860.

By 1871, he won the chair of general anatomy at the Central University Faculty of Medicine (Spanish: Universidad Central Facultad de Medicina). In 1873, the anatomy professor addressed the opening of the academic term of 1873–1874 at the Central University.

Julián Callenga assumed the role of dean at the Old Medicine School of San Carlos in 1877, serving for 25 years.

On September 2, 1881, he became a member of the Senate of Spain, holding the position of Senator for the University of Zaragoza until 1903.

Calleja was serving as the director general of public instruction in 1886.

He was admitted to the Spanish Royal Academy of Sciences in Madrid on May 29, 1892.

Julián Calleja y Sánchez took part in Senate sessions on June 13, 14, 15, and 24, 1892, opposing the entire expenditure budget and the Ministry of Development's Public Instruction and Statistical Geographical Institute branches.

In 1893, the Professor of Anatomy at the Faculty of Medicine of Madrid, attended the 11th International Medical Congress. He presented his work titled Topographical Craticule of the Human Body Thesis.

He presided over the Spanish Royal Academy of Medicine in 1904. In 1908, he nominated Swedish anatomist Gustaf Retzius for the Nobel Prize in Physiology or Medicine.

== Death ==
Julián Calleja y Sánchez died in Madrid, Spain on April 13, 1913.

== Works ==
- Treaty of human anatomy: Volume 1 (Spanish: Tratado de anatomía humana), 1869
- Report on the Scientific Construction of the Sources of Knowledge and the Teaching Method of Human Anatomy (Spanish: Memoria Acerca de la Construcción Cientifica de Las Fuentes Del Conocimiento Y Del Método de Enseñanza de la Anatomía Humana), 1873
- New compendium of descriptive and general anatomy: Volume 1 (Spanish: Nuevo compendio de anatomía descriptiva y general: Volume 1), 1878
- Compendium of descriptive anatomy and human embryology (Spanish: Compendio de anatomía descriptiva y de embriología humanas), 1897
- Program of descriptive anatomy and human embriology for the use of the disciples of Julián Calleja y Sanchez (Spanish: Programa de Anatomía descriptiva y de embriologia humanas para uso de los discipulos de Julián Calleja y Sanchez), 1901

== Gallery ==
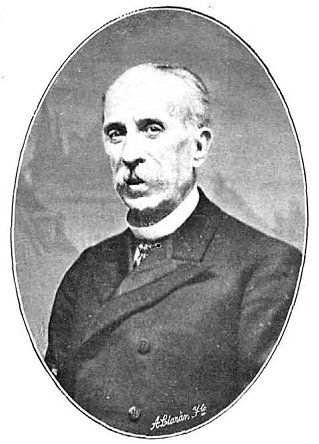
Dr. Julián Calleja y Sánchez

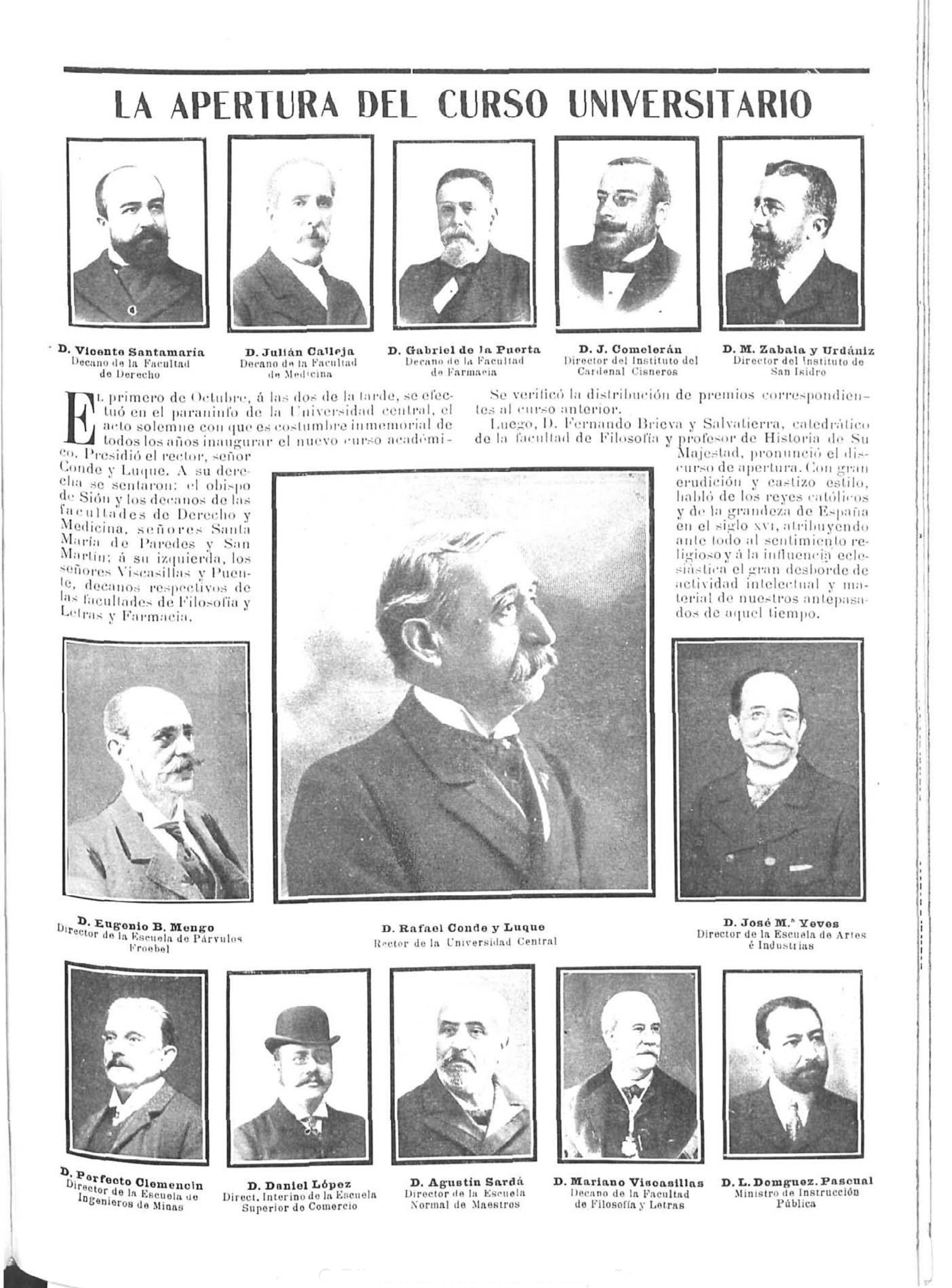
Julián Calleja y Sánchez, 1904

== See also ==
- Islands of Calleja
