= Enrique De Jongh Caula =

Cuban architect and civil engineer (1931–2020)

Enrique Marcelo De Jongh Caula (January 16, 1931 – October 23, 2020) was a Cuban architect and civil engineer, and a member of the Cuban Academy of Sciences. He received an architecture degree in 1955 from the University of Havana, and in 1987 a PhD in Technical Sciences with specialization in construction.
