= Calle del Humilladero =

Street in Madrid, Spain

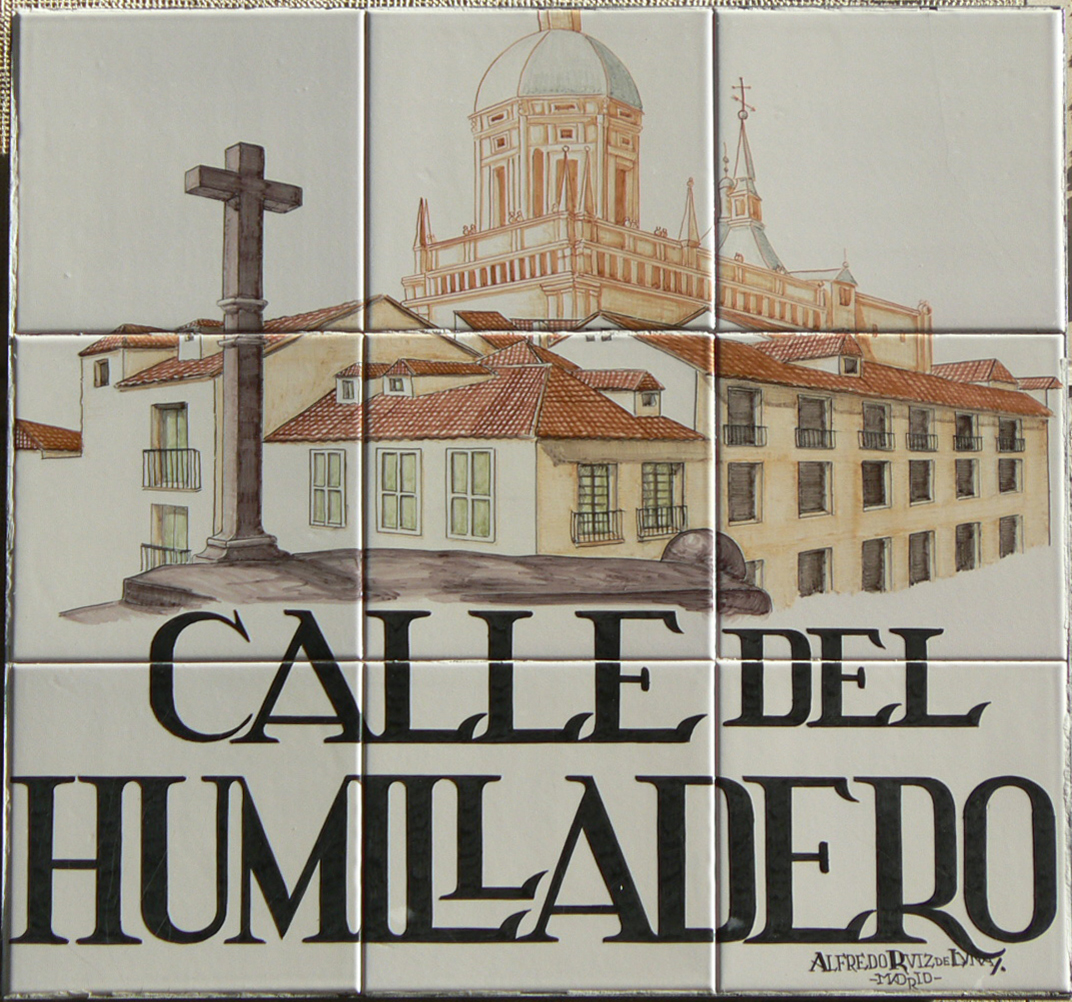
- Type: Street
- Location: Madrid, Spain
- Coordinates: 40°24′36″N 3°42′37″W

The Calle del Humilladero or Humilladero Street is a street in Madrid, Spain. Located in the Centro District.

== History ==
Originally called Humilladero de San Francisco after a shrine created by Saint Francis of Assisi, it was later renamed Calle del Humilladero.

In 1612, the convent of the Sisters of the Most Holy Trinity was established on the street in Madrid. In April 1616, Spanish novelist Miguel de Cervantes was buried in the Trinitarian Convent of Calle del Humilladero. The convent occupied by nuns of the Trinitarian Sisters of Madrid was later abandoned and in the 1630s, they relocated to Calle de Cataranas.

The Catholic Church of Saint Patrick of the Irish (Spanish: La Iglesia San Patricio de los Irlandeses), founded in 1629, for the Irish community in Madrid was located on the street of Humilladero.

In 1835, a primary school, sanctioned by royal decree, was established on Calle del Humilladero.
