= Carolina Marcial Dorado =

Spanish educator, writer, and lecturer (1889–1941)

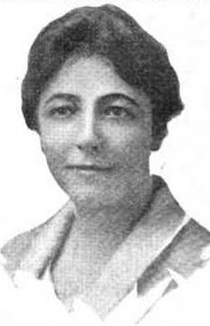
- Carolina Marcial Dorado, from a 1919 publication.
- Born: 1889; Camuñas, Toledo, Spain
- Died: July 25, 1941 (aged 51–52); New York, New York
- Occupation: educator

Carolina Marcial Dorado (1889 – July 25, 1941) was a Spanish educator, writer, and lecturer based in the United States. She was head of the Spanish department at Barnard College from 1920 until her death in 1941.

== Early life ==
Carolina Marcial Dorado was born in Camuñas, Toledo, the daughter of José Marcial Palacios, a Protestant clergyman, and María de la Luz Marcial-Dorado; her parents were originally from Andalusia. Her older brother, José Marcial Dorado, was a journalist and briefly a member of the Spanish parliament; he was also secretary of the American Bible Society for the Caribbean, based in Cuba.

Carolina Marcial Dorado was raised by grandparents in Seville, and attended a Protestant girls' school run by American missionary Alice Gordon Gulick. In 1905 she traveled to the United States to represent the school on a mission fundraising tour. She completed a college course in Madrid in 1907. She earned a master's degree at the University of Pennsylvania.

== Career ==
Marcial Dorado taught Spanish at Wellesley College from 1907 to 1911, and Spanish literature at the University of Puerto Rico from 1911 to 1917. In 1918, she was an associate professor at Bryn Mawr College, and in 1919 she taught a summer course on "Spain and Spanish Countries" at UCLA. In 1920 she became a professor and head of the Spanish department at Barnard College. She also established and taught at a summer study program in Barcelona and Madrid, before the Spanish Civil War.

She edited books for Ginn and Company. From 1925, she was also director of publications at International Telephone & Telegraph. She was also an associate editor of the journal Hispania. She corresponded and worked with Spanish educator Maria de Maeztu Whitney and writer Zenobia Camprubí, especially during the Spanish Civil War. Marcial Dorado was awarded the Grand Cross of Alfonso XII and the Silver Cross of Civil Merit.

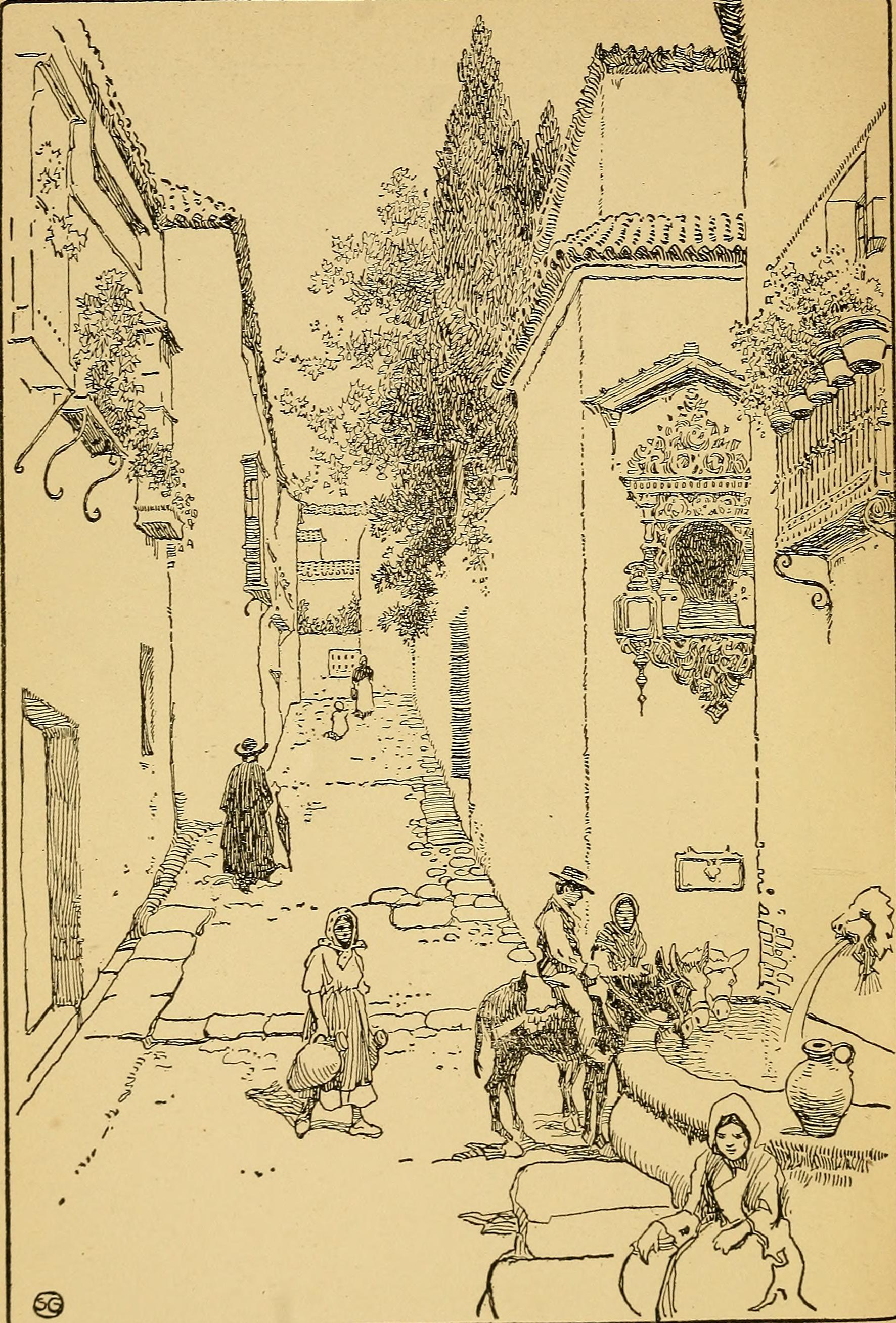
An illustration from Marcial Dorado's first book, España pintoresca (1917)

== Publications ==
Publications by Marcial Dorado included Espana Pintoresca: The Life and Customs of Spain In Story and Legend (1917), Primeras lecciones de español (1918), Primeras lecturas en español (1920), Trozos Modernos: Selections from Modern Spanish Writers (1922, co-edited with Medora Loomis Ray), and Segundas lecciones de español (1925). "It is a joy to find this sane book thoroughly Spanish without running too much to archaic fable or fairy-tale vocabulary," one reviewer commented on a textbook by Marcial Dorado. "Songs, games, riddles, proverbs spice it." She also wrote a play, Rosas de España (1908), performed at Wellesley, and published a collection of short plays titled Chispitas (1927), and another textbook, Pasitos (1935).

== Personal life ==
Marcial Dorado died in New York in 1941, aged 51 years, from a heart attack. "Such a spirit does not die," wrote a colleague in tribute. "It is built into the personality of the college she served so long, and there it lives on always." In 1953 Barnard College established a Carolina Marcial Dorado Spanish Scholarship Fund, named in her memory.
