= Islands of Calleja =

Group of neural granule cells

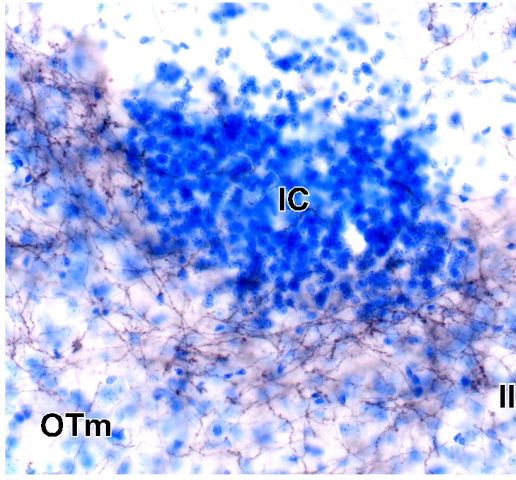
- Islands of Calleja of rat brain stained in blue. Denoted under IC abbreviation.

Details
- Part of: Ventral Striatum
- Artery: Anterior cerebral artery anterior communicating artery middle cerebral artery

Identifiers
- Latin: insulae olfactoriae, insula callejae
- Acronym: ISC or IClj
- MeSH: D020670
- NeuroNames: 276
- NeuroLex ID: birnlex_1113
- FMA: 61888

The islands of Calleja (Spanish: [kaˈʎexa]; IC, ISC, or IClj) are a group of neural granule cells located within the ventral striatum in the brains of most animals. This region of the brain is part of the limbic system, where it aids in the reinforcing effects of reward-like activities. Within most species, the islands are specifically located within the olfactory tubercle; however, in primates, these islands are located within the nucleus accumbens, the reward center of the brain, since the olfactory tubercle has practically disappeared in the brains of primates. Both of these structures have been implicated in the processing of incentives as well as addictions to drugs. Projections to and from the islands supplement this knowledge with their involvement in the reward pathways for both cocaine and amphetamines.

== Location ==
The islands of Calleja are specifically located within the ventral and medial lining of the ventral striatum in the brain, meaning that they lie towards the front and middle of this region within the temporal lobe. The insula magna, or the major island, of these complexes is located in the medial border of the nucleus accumbens. The ventral group of the islands lies along the pial border of the basal forebrain, a region of the frontal lobe that lies adjacent to the temporal lobe. Due to high concentrations of nitric oxide synthase, an enzyme that makes nitric oxide and includes another enzyme known as NADPH-diaphorase, the islands can be visualized via NADPH-diaphorase staining. Using this method, the islands have been suggested to be a single heterogeneous cell complex. The exact grouping of these structures is unique across species; however, the shaping of the structures is not the same across the hemispheres of the brain.

== Etymology ==
The islands of Calleja are named after Julián Calleja y Sánchez, the Spanish anatomist, who studied the structure prior to publishing a paper in 1893 entitled "La región olfatoria del cerebro" ("The olfactory region of the brain"). Although the structure was named after him, Calleja was not the first to study it. Sigbert Ganser, a German psychiatrist, published a paper in 1882 that discussed the region. Furthermore, the current accepted definition of the islands of Calleja is not the same as the region Calleja himself studied. He was examining the thick portions of the cell layer of the olfactory tubercle rather than the granule cells that bear his name today.

== Neurogenesis of neurons in the islands of Calleja ==
=== Sub-ventricular zone ===
Originating from the lateral ganglionic eminence, one of the three embryonic structures that eventually become specific parts of the brain, the sub-ventricular zone (SVZ) is a group of cells that develop along the surface of the ventricular layer of the brain, following the creation of the cortical plate in embryos. The cells generated from this region migrate either radially along or tangentially to radial glia, the cells that help guide neurons to their targeted destination. These progenitors from the SVZ are best known for their migration down the rostral migratory stream to differentiate into the different cells of the olfactory bulb. However, a separate mass of cells, referred to as the "ventral migratory mass," migrates from the SVZ to the basal forebrain, where it develops into the islands of Calleja.

=== FOXP2 gene expression ===
The Fox family is a group of genes encoding certain transcription factors that all begin with the same group of nucleotides that attach to a specific promoter on a DNA strand. Most members of the FOX proteins are typically involved in the formation of certain structures of an embryo, where mutations in these genes are evident through the human developmental disorders that result. Of these genes, the FOXP2 variant was the first to be connected to inherited language and speech disorders. Within the islands of Calleja, FOXP2 gene expression has been observed in the developing basal forebrain of monkeys as well as rodents; furthermore, this gene expression has been viewed alongside the expression of two other transcription factors, PBX3 and MEIS2. Developing neurons that express these genes originate from the subventricular zone; for this reason, the involvement of all three of these genes is thought to be responsible for determining the final destination of the neurons in the islands of Calleja.

== Structure and neuronal pathways ==
In rodents, the islands of Calleja are composed of seven distinct clusters within the olfactory tubercle, with the major island creating a border between the septum, the nucleus accumbens, and the diagonal band. Some of the islands contain a "core" of neuropil, or unmyelinated axons and dendrites, filled with a large cell in some cases. Projections to and from the islands connect the structures to the piriform cortex, which is responsible for processing smell, as well as areas of the basal forebrain, a region responsible for determining an animal's level of wakefulness. The projections with the piriform cortex align with the rest of the olfactory system, the path beginning in the sensory cells of the nose and then proceeding through the olfactory bulb to regions such as the piriform cortex, olfactory tubercle, and amygdala. However, the projections to the basal forebrain structures actually originate from the smaller outer cells of the island clusters as opposed to the large cells within the "core."

The islands of Calleja receive inputs from the back of the amygdala, which processes emotional memory, as well as the septum, nucleus accumbens, and piriform cortex. The islands also receive information in the form of dopamine from the substantia nigra and ventral tegmental area, located in the midbrain of the brainstem. Information traveling from these midbrain structures is triggered in response to rewarding activities or feelings. The islands project to the back of the thalamus, a region with many responsibilities such as sensory information processing, regulation of wakefulness, and relaying information to the cerebral cortex.

== Receptor proteins ==
- Bcl-2: The cells within the islands of Calleja that contain the Bcl-2 marker exhibit neuronal immaturity. They are numerous in the islands and are thought to aid in developing pathways for specific response.
- Cannabinoid receptor CB2: The cannabinoid receptors are a class of G protein-coupled receptors that bind either internally or externally produced cannabinoids. The CB2 variant was initially believed to be involved only with the cells in the immune system; however, they have been identified in the islands of Calleja and other structures of the limbic system, supporting the idea that this receptor has a neuronal function as well. This function has yet to be determined though. While the CB1 variant of the receptor has a pre-synaptic localization, it is thought that the CB2 receptors may possess a post-synaptic localization.
- Dopamine receptor D2: The islands of Calleja are different from other regions in the ventral striatum in that they actually exhibit no expression of this receptor.
- Dopamine receptor D3: These specific dopamine receptors exhibit different effects on cells depending on their location in the brain. In the islands of Calleja, their presence inversely affects an animal's interest in an unfamiliar area and the animal's tendency to form addictions. These receptors also contribute to the hypothermic response associated with a lowered room temperature in response to the drug Ecstasy. D3 dopamine receptors on the granule cells of the Islands of Calleja represent the primary molecular targets of cariprazine, a third-generation antipsychotic drug in the mouse brain.
- Muscarinic acetylcholine receptor M4: The muscarinic acetylcholine receptors are types of G protein-coupled receptors that regulate the effects of acetylcholine on the nervous system. In rodents, the core of the individual islands of Calleja contains high concentrations of the M4 receptor, whereas the peripheral granule cell clusters have lower concentrations, allowing each island to be easily visualized by staining for this specific receptor. The composition of the M4 receptors in the islands of Calleja in the brains of monkeys is similar to that of rodents; however, many of the islands, besides the major island, do not exhibit a noticeable core structure.
- Neurotensin receptor NTS3: Neurotensin is a neurotransmitter/neuromodulator associated with a number of functions, such as responses to pain, temperature, sleep-wake cycles, and dopamine. NTS3 is identical to the sorting protein sortilin and possesses many other functions outside the central nervous system. NTS3 is expressed in areas that also express the neurotensin receptor NTS1, including the islands of Calleja.
- Oxytocin receptor: Oxytocin is a molecule that induces maternal behaviors in animals. During childbirth, substantial increases in the expression of this receptor occur in the major island of the islands of Calleja. Furthermore, the extent of the increase depends on the mother's previous maternal experience. These changes within the islands of Calleja are connected to the differences in progesterone and estrogen levels during pregnancy.
- Phosphodiesterase 7B: Through the degradation of nucleotides, phosphodiesterases (PDE) produce cyclic adenosine monophosphate (cAMP), a molecule involved in sensory processing, neural plasticity, learning, and memory. Of the different families of phosphodiesterases, the 7B variant is one that bonds most easily to cAMP. Within the islands of Calleja, PDE7B is involved in the expression of the dopamine receptor D3. It may also be associated with transferring chemical information from the islands to other regions of the brain.
- Prokineticin: The islands contain the mRNA associated with the PK2 variant of the protein as well as the receptor variant PKR1. This class of proteins and receptors is partially responsible for the neurogenesis of cells in the olfactory bulb and certain reproductive behaviors, such as the hormonal events involved with the reproductive system.
- Serotonin 5-HT6 receptor: The serotonin 5-HT_{6} receptor helps to increase neuronal cAMP production. Within the islands of Calleja and other structures of the striatum, these receptors may play a role in locomotor activity and memory.
- Syntrophin-associated serine/ threonine kinase (SAST): Syntrophin is an adaptor protein that connects other signaling proteins to dystrophin, a protein with major associations to muscular dystrophy. The SAST variant SAST124 is found in the islands of Calleja and other regions associated with the islands, such as the sub-ventricular zone and the olfactory bulb.

== Function ==
As is the case with many structures of the brain, many of the functions of the islands of Calleja have yet to be confirmed and remain as suggestions.

=== Influences on the cardiovascular system ===
The islands regulate the amount of blood supplied to the ventral pallidum and other surrounding areas by adjusting the degree of dilation of the blood vessels that pass through the islands and the ventral pallidum. This vasodilation is adjusted by the action of nitric oxide. Injection of glutamate into the islands results in decreases in arterial pressure and heart rate, suggesting that the islands are involved to some degree in the regulation of arterial pressure and heart rate. The islands also inhibit the effects of the sympathetic nervous system on the cardiovascular system by responding to changes in pressure.

=== Influences on neurological disorders ===
Changes in behavior due to schizophrenia have been traced back to the high level of D3 dopamine receptors within the islands of Calleja as well as the high concentrations of dopamine passing through them. Damage to the islands due to restricted blood supply has been linked to a condition of amnesia and personality changes. Other behavioral and emotional responses occur as well due to serotonin that interacts with the islands.

=== Influences on the reward pathways ===
The islands of Calleja are directly connected with some of the major reward centers of the brain. By receiving dopamine inputs from the substantia nigra and the ventral tegmental area, the islands become one of the many regions that process the rewarding feelings associated with this neurotransmitter. The interactions of the islands with the amygdala aid in processing how the body remembers the feelings associated with the release of dopamine. Opioids and amphetamines take advantage of the reward pathways in that they influence greater releases of dopamine and other neurotransmitters that reinforce the feelings associated with the administration and effects of the drugs. The islands of Calleja become more involved with substances administered through the nose, due to the island's involvement in both olfaction and the reward pathways. The islands of Calleja region is the preferential binding site for cariprazine withinin the mouse striatum, a drug known for its strong antipsychotic and antidepressant efficacy.

=== Others ===
Some of the neurons within the islands also act as interneurons, passing on information between other brain regions along the same pathway as the islands. In rodents, the islands play a role in reproduction due to the neurons' estrogen-binding capacity and the structure's ability to concentrate estradiol. They also play a role in the reward pathways and processing pheromone inputs from the nose.
