= Valseca =

- Municipality
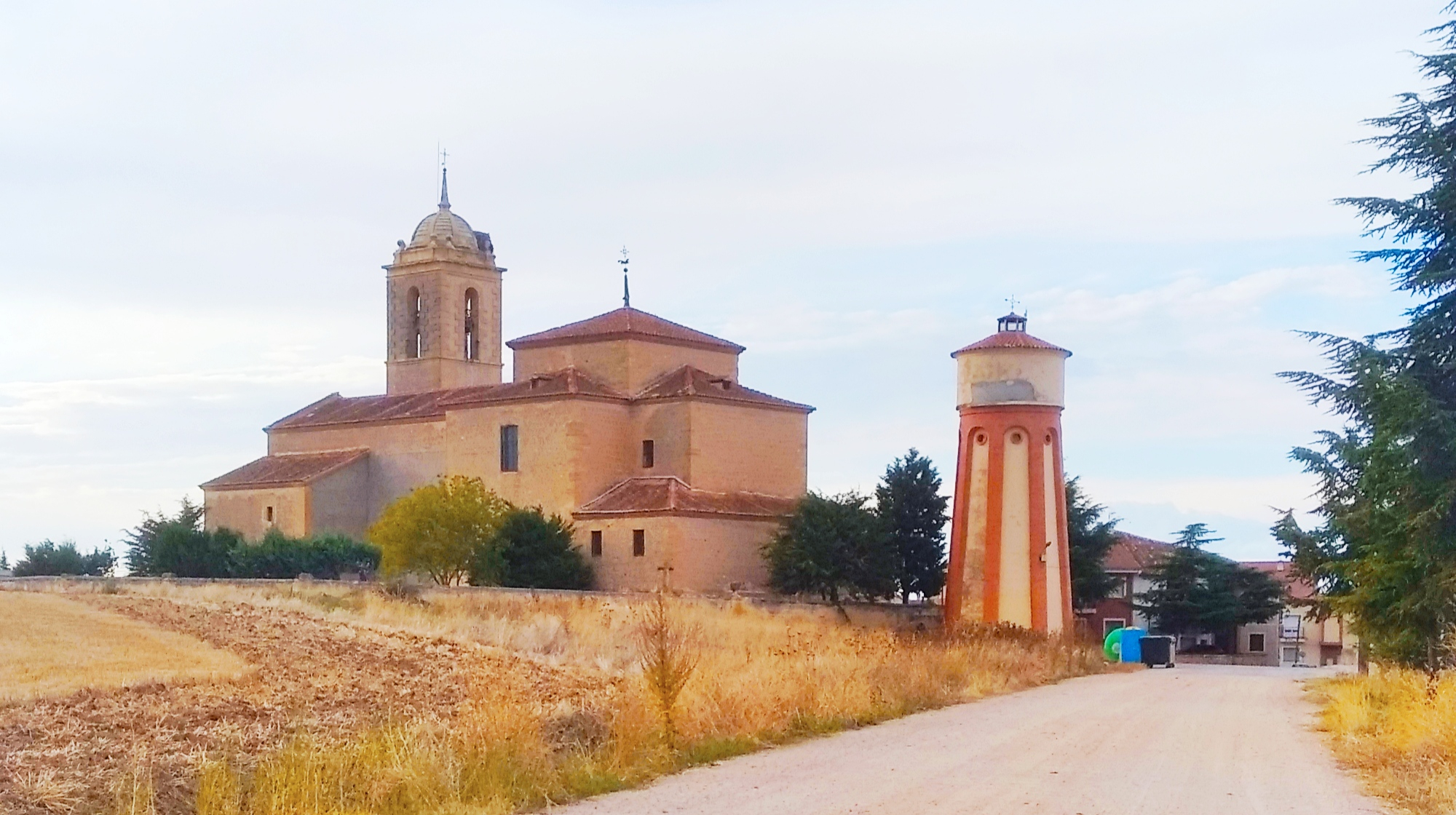
- Street of Valseca

- Flag Coat of arms

- Location in Spain. Valseca (Spain)
- Coordinates: 40°59′59″N 4°10′28″W
- Country: Spain
- Autonomous community: Castile and León
- Province: Segovia
- Municipality: Valseca

Area
  - Total: 23 km^{2} (8.9 sq mi)

Population (2025-01-01)
  - Total: 208
  - Density: 9.0/km^{2} (23/sq mi)
- Time zone: UTC+1 (CET)
  - Summer (DST): UTC+2 (CEST)
- Website: Official website

Valseca is a municipality located in the province of Segovia, Castile and León, Spain. According to the 2004 census (INE), the municipality has a population of 301 inhabitants.
