= José Gómez de Arteche =

Spanish army officer and historian (1821–1906)

- Born: 13 March 1821; Carabanchel de Arriba (Madrid), Spain
- Died: 26 January 1906 (aged 84–85) Madrid

José Gómez de Arteche y Moro de Elexabeitia (13 March 1821 – 26 January 1906) was a Spanish military officer, historian and senator, best known for his 14-volume Guerra de la Independencia. Historia Militar de España de 1808 a 1814, the first volume of which was published in 1868. Gómez de Arteche was elected a member of Spain's Royal Academy of History in 1871.

In the preface to Volume II (1903) of his A History of the Peninsular War, Charles Oman acknowledges Arteche's personal contribution to Oman's work.

== Early career ==
Having enlisted as a cadet at the Artillery Academy in 1836, he was promoted to lieutenant in 1843 and over the next few years was commissioned to draw plans of several towns, before being transferred to the General Staff where, in 1847, he was promoted to major.

== Later career ==
In 1862, a royal order commissioned Gómez de Arteche to write the history of Spain's War of Independence (known in English-language historiography as the Peninsular War). The first volume of the 14-volume work, Guerra de la Independencia. Historia Militar de España de 1808 a 1814, was published in 1868.

From 1877 to September 1878, he was aide-de-camp to King Alfonso XII. In 1885 he was named senator for Guipúzcoa.
