= El Anfiteatro Anatómico Español =

Spanish medical journal (1873–1880)

- Discipline: Medicine
- Language: Spanish

Publication details
- History: 1 February 1873
- Frequency: Fortnightly

Standard abbreviations
- ISO 4: Anfiteatro Anat. Esp.

Indexing
- ISSN: 1131-107X

El Anfiteatro Anatómico Español (English: The Spanish Anatomical Amphitheater) was a Spanish medical journal dedicated to the fields of Medicine, Surgery, and Auxiliary Sciences, founded in the 19th century.

== History ==
The medical journal was established by Segovian physician Pedro González de Velasco and began publication on 1 February 1873.

The idea of the journal was realized by Dr. Velasco in Madrid, Spain. Established with Velasco as its founding director, managing director Eduardo García Pérez, and the Editor-in-chief Dr. Ángel Pulido.

In 1875, upon Dr. Velasco's death, Francisco Vidurre became the administrator of the paper and it was the official organ of the Spanish Anatomical Society.

On 1 January 1876 it was combined with The Medical Pavilion (Spanish: El Pabellón Médico), a magazine by Pedro Mata y Fontanet.

El Anfiteatro Anatómico Español was published until 1880, at which point it merged with the Journal of Medicine and Practical Surgery.
