= National Museum of Anthropology (Madrid) =

Anthropology museum in Madrid, Spain

- Museo Nacional de Antropología
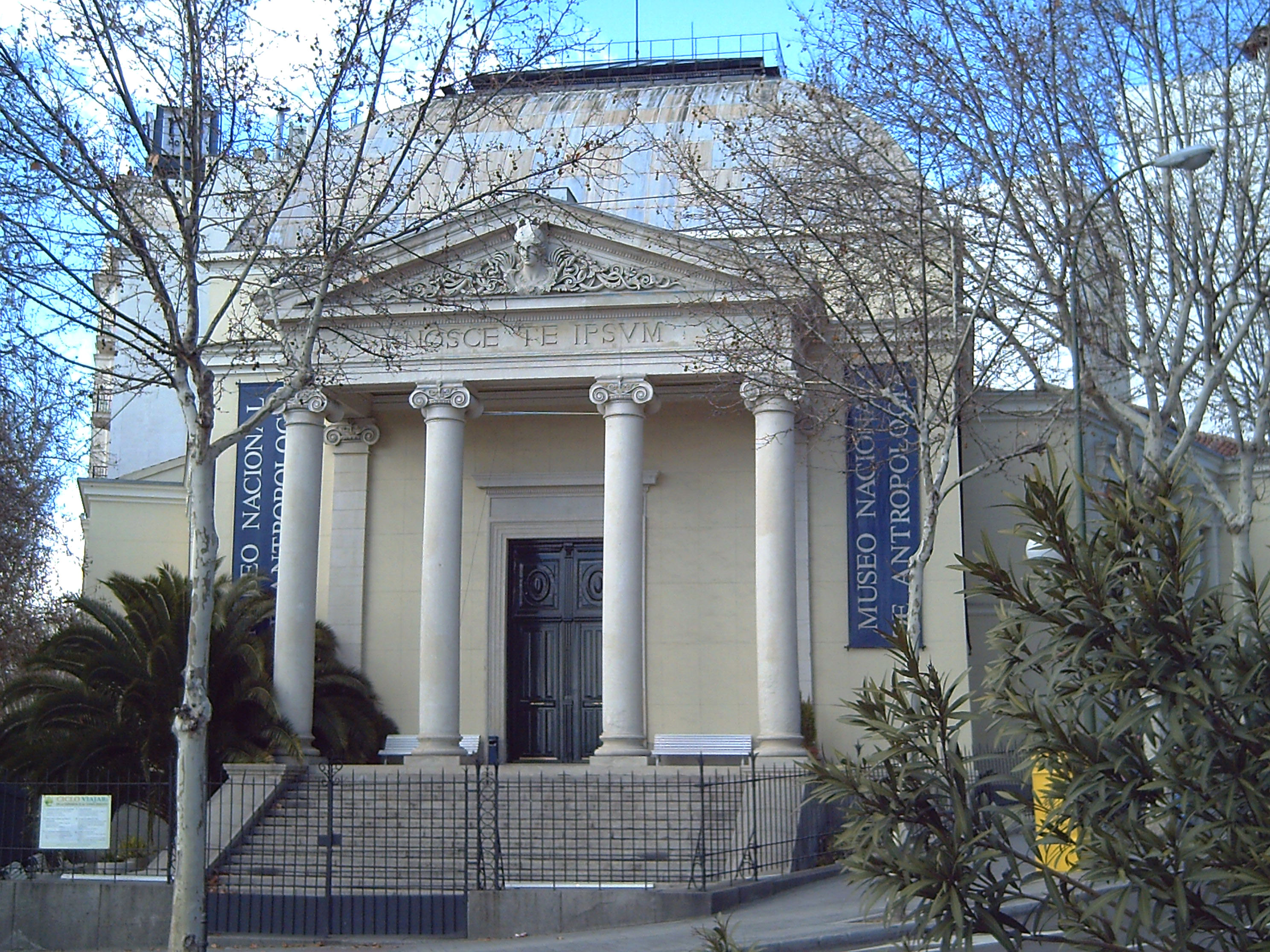
- Museum's main facade
- Established: 1875
- Location: Madrid, Spain
- Coordinates: 40°24′28″N 3°41′20″W
- Type: Archaeological and ethnographic
- Public transit access: Madrid-Atocha
- Website: mnantropologia.mcu.es

Spanish Cultural Heritage
- Official name: Museo Nacional de Antropología
- Type: Non-movable
- Criteria: Monument
- Designated: 1962
- Reference no.: RI-51-0001384

The National Museum of Anthropology (Spanish: Museo Nacional de Antropología) is an anthropology museum in Madrid, Spain. It is considered the oldest of its kind in Spain, formally inaugurated on 29 April 1875, during the reign of Alfonso XII. It is one of the National Museums of Spain and it is attached to the Ministry of Culture.

The museum is located near the Parque del Buen Retiro and opposite Atocha railway and metro station.

== History ==
Dr. Pedro González de Velasco promoted his project of a museum of Anatomy and assembled the early collections. The focus later passed from physical to cultural anthropology.

== Structure ==
Each of its three floors is dedicated to a different subject:

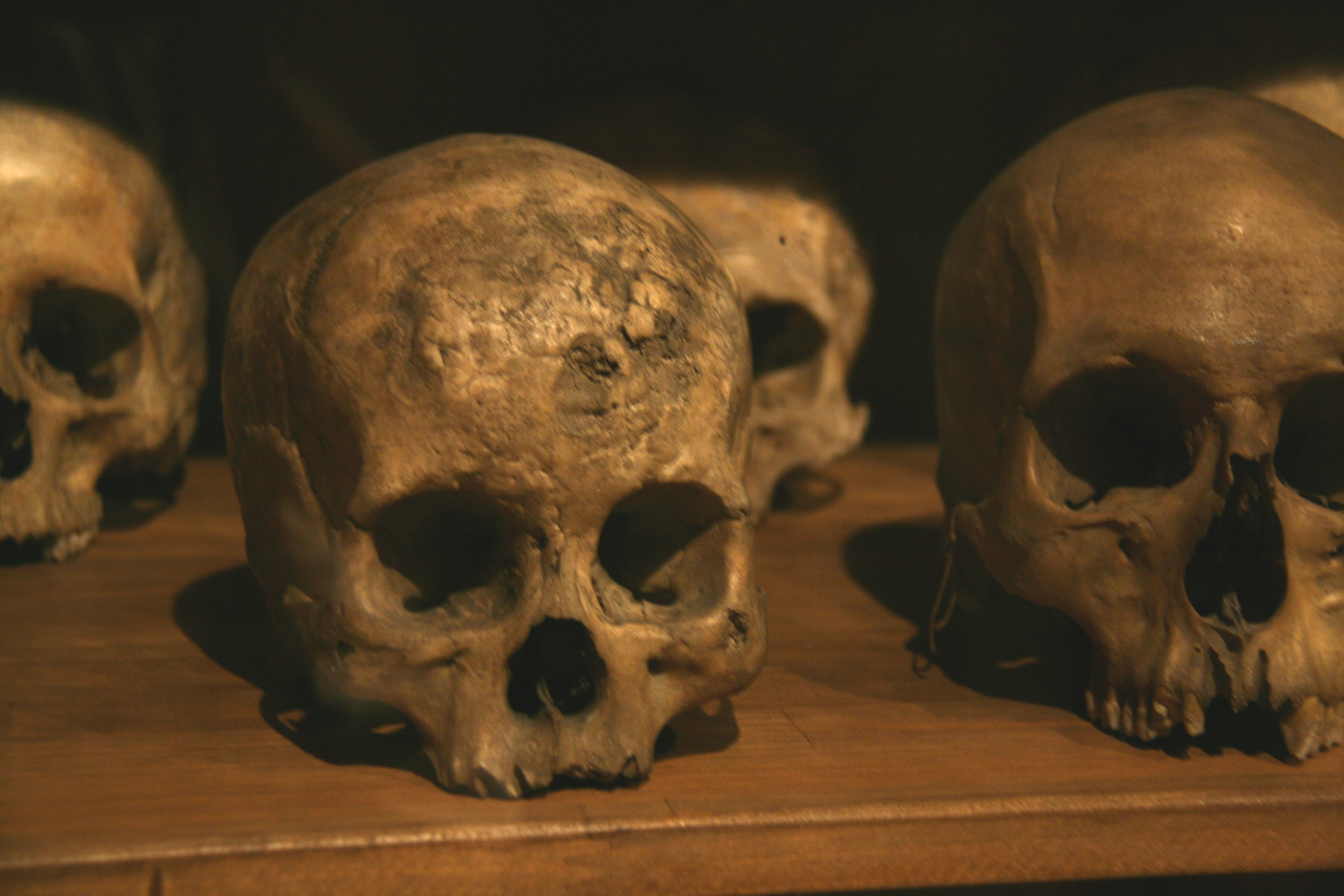
A collection of skulls from the beginnings of the museum.

- Ground floor. The Asia hall, devoting a special attention to the culture of the Philippines, a Spanish colony until 1898, with many items taken from an 1885 exposition in nearby Retiro Park. It also dedicates side rooms to temporary exhibitions and a cabinet of curiosities giving an impression of the early exhibitions including a plaster cast and the skeleton of the "Extremaduran Giant" (Agustín Luengo Capilla), and statues and plaster casts of several racial types.
- First floor. The Africa hall, with a prominent representation of the culture of Equatorial Guinea, a Spanish colony until 1959.

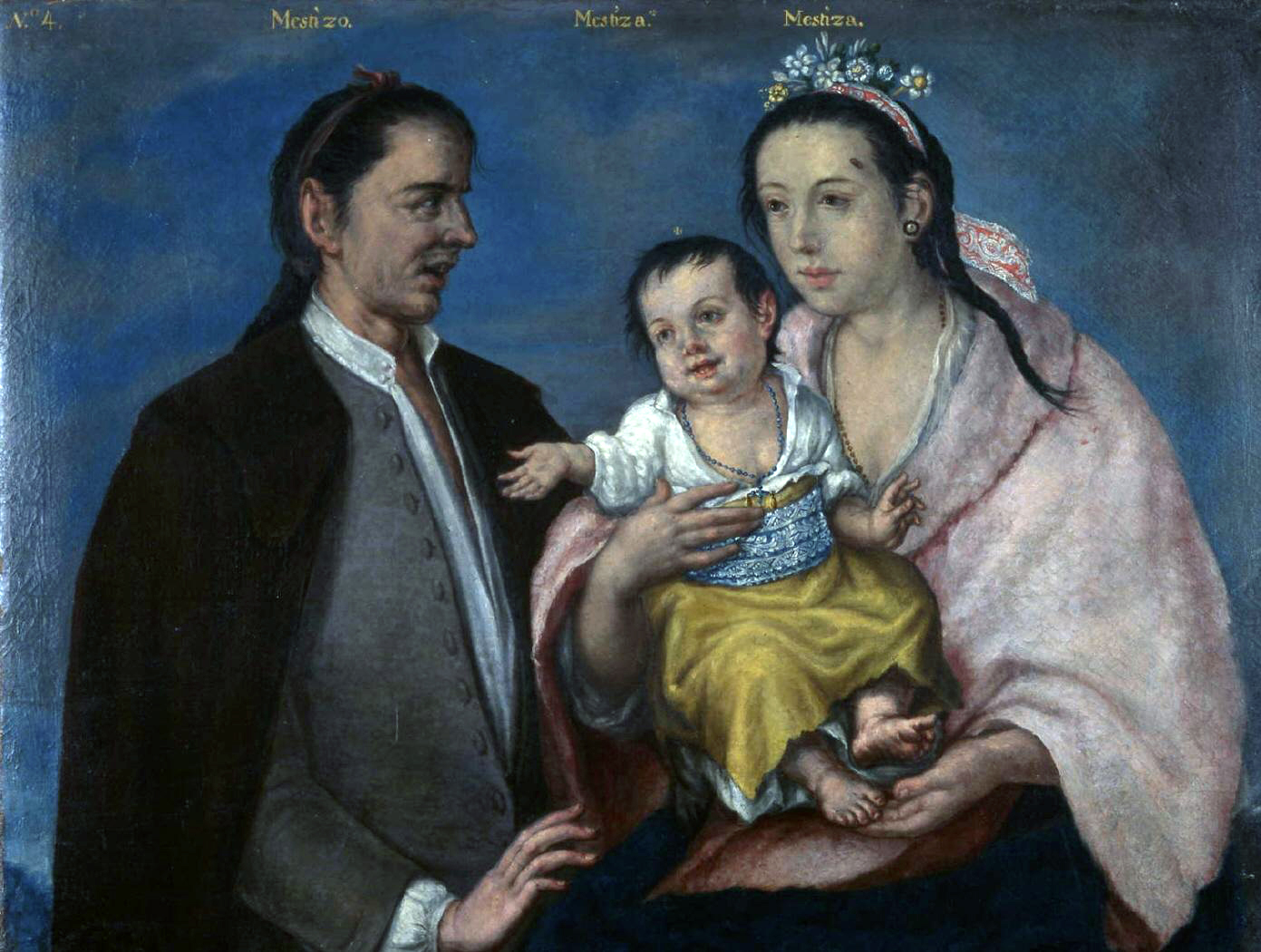
A Peruvian example of pintura de castas ("caste pictures"), showing a Mestizo as the offspring of Mestizo parents.

- Second floor. The Americas hall, covering indigenous peoples of the Americas, with items like Jivaro reduced heads, Andean Carnival masks, and Inuit sun goggles.

A lecture hall allows performances of traditional music and dances and lectures.
