= Sisters of the Most Holy Trinity =

Congregation of the Sisters of the Most Holy Trinity
- Istituto delle suore della Santissima Trinità
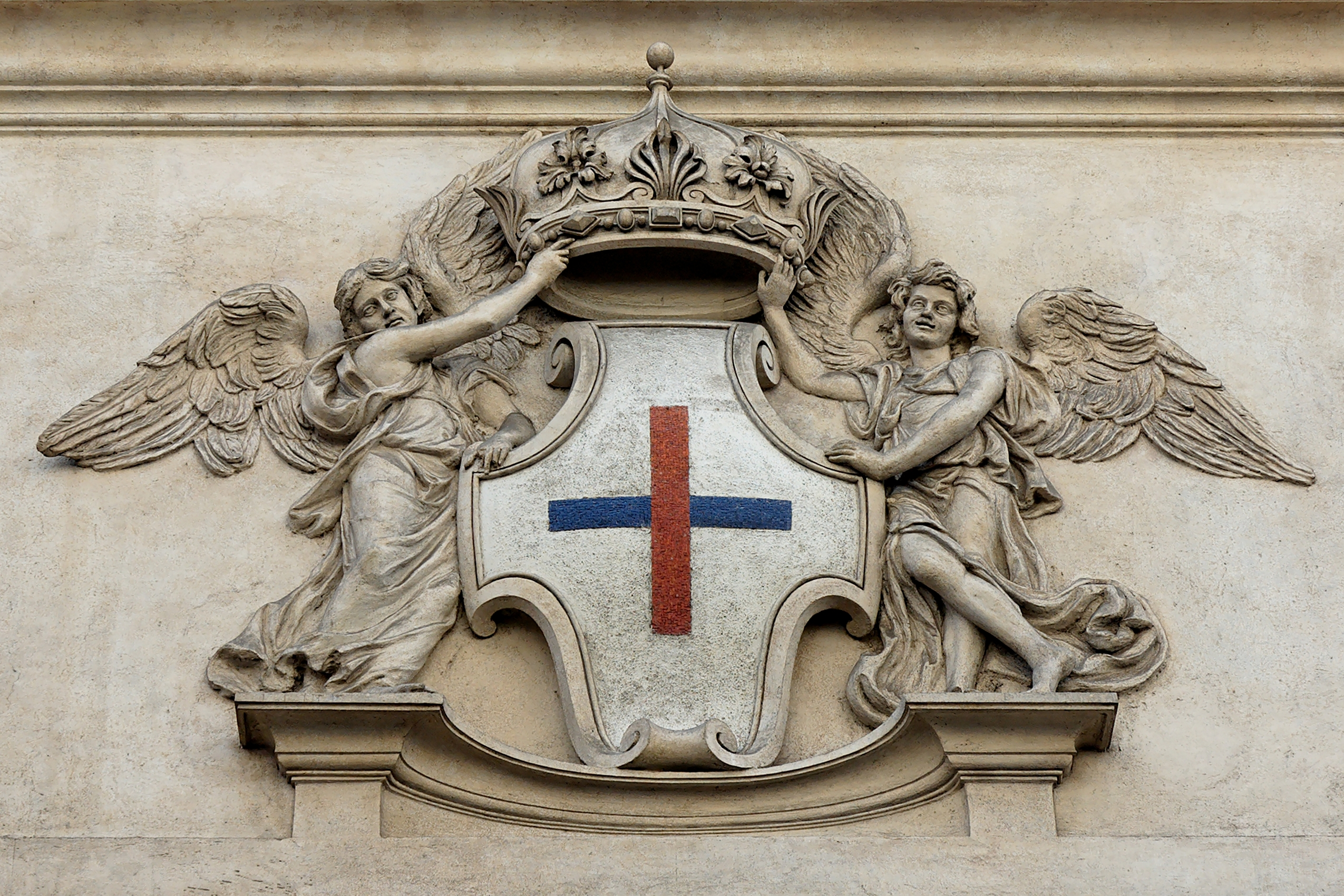
- Abbreviation: S.T.
- Formation: 1762
- Founder: Maria Teresa Cucchiari
- Type: religious congregation (Institute of Consecrated Life)
- Headquarters: Via della Madonna del Riposo 71, 00165 Rome, Italy.
- Members: 315 (2013)
- Superior General: Mother Maria Clotilde Testa S.T.
- Website: www.trinitarieroma.it

The Congregation Sisters of the Most Holy Trinity, also known as the Trinitarian Sisters of Rome, is a Roman Catholic religious congregation of religious sisters based in Rome, were founded in 1762.

== History ==
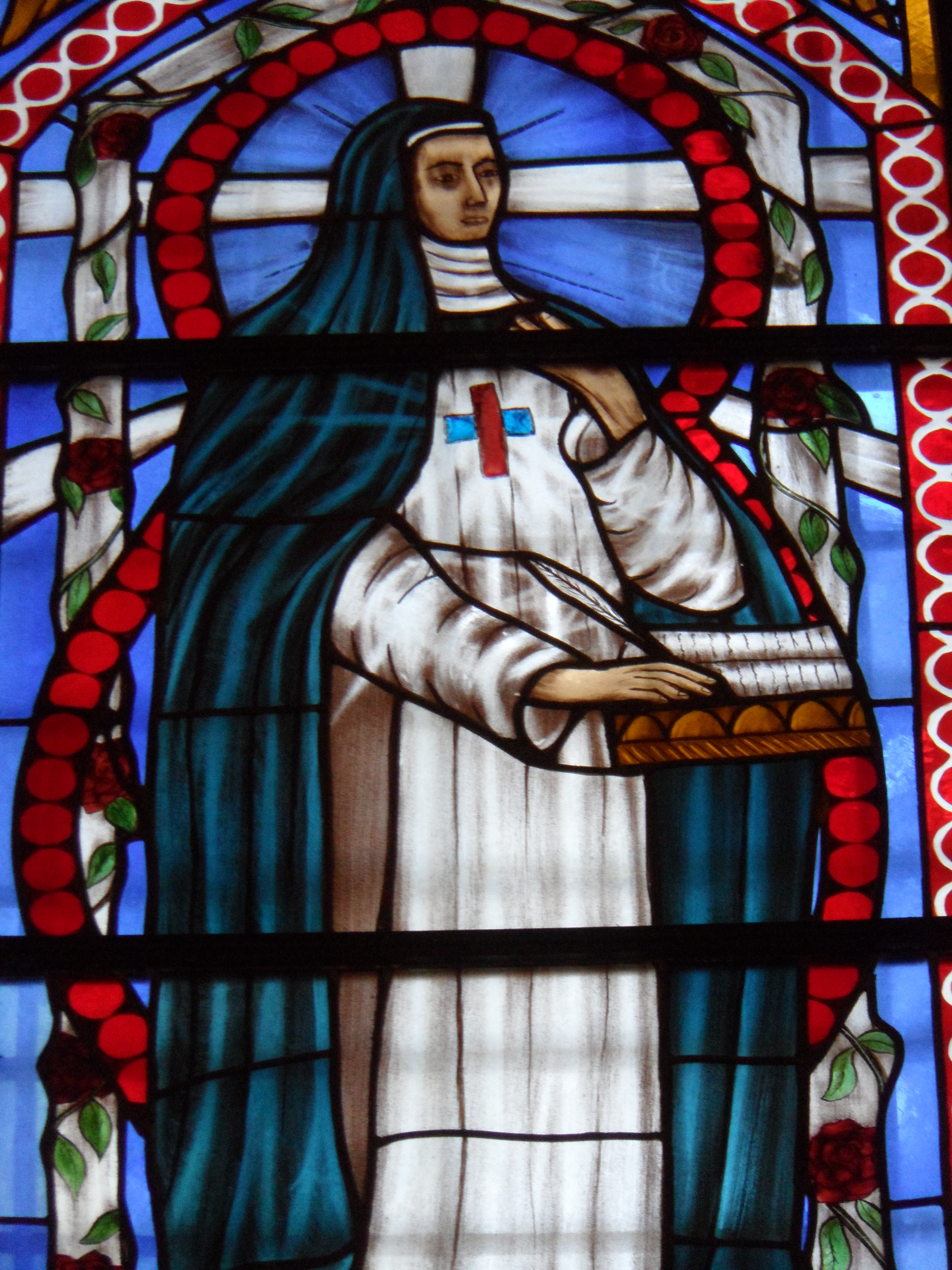
Maria Teresa Cucchiari depicted at San Tommaso in Formis

The congregation was founded in Rome by Trinitarian tertiaries Maria Teresa Cucchiari, Mariana Rizzoti and Anna Reina. Guided by Fr. Félix of Jesus and Mary, a Spanish Trinitarian living at San Carlino alle Quattro Fontane, they accepted the invitation from Cardinal Marcantonio Colonna to establish a school in Avezzano (Aquila) for catechizing and imparting some basic education to poor girls of the region. They were invested with the full habit of the Trinitarian Discalced nuns on September 8, 1762, and took the names of Maria Teresa of the Most Holy Trinity, Marianna of the Holy Redeemer and Maria Felice of the Holy Spirit, respectively.

The juridical journey that transformed these Sisters into a pontifical institute could be clearer. Initially, they were tertiaries who went by the name of Maestre Pie dell'Ordine dei Trinitari Scalzi del Riscatto (Pious Teachers the Order of the Discalced Trinitarians of the Ransom). They made no novitiate, took no canonical vows and were not bound to the recitation of the Divine Office. They wore the habit of the Discalced Trinitarian nuns but not the sandals. Their houses, called ritiri (retreat houses), did not keep the strict papal cloister, were autonomous and had no superior general. Their rule and Constitutions were broadly based on those of the Discalced Trinitarian nuns and were occasionally modified by the Congregation's directors or local bishops.

In 1771, Fr. Nicolás of the Virgin, a Spanish Trinitarian residing at St. Carlino, drafted their first Constitutions, which introduced the optional profession of religious vows and gave the Maestre Pie a superior general. She was to be elected for a lifetime term by the bishops of the dioceses where the Maestre had houses or could be appointed by the bishop of the diocese where the previous superior general had resided. Sr. Maria Teresa Cucchiari was the first superior general in conformity with these Constitutions. She professed her vows in the cathedral of Avezzano on October 10, 1772, and governed the congregation until her death on June 10, 1801.

== Organization ==
The congregation is a pontifical institute whose purpose is the glorification of the Most Holy Trinity and the Christian education of young girls.

The Trinitarian Sisters of Rome are headed by the Superior General and the congregation's general council; these officers serve six-year terms; the Superior General and the members of the general council are elected by the Chapter General, which meets every six years or upon the death of the Superior General. Each local Trinitarian community is headed by a superior, called a Superior, who is appointed to a three-year term and can be renewed for a second three-year term. The current Superior General of the Trinitarian Sisters of Rome is Mother Maria Clotilde Testa S.T.

== Distribution ==
In 2013, the Trinitarian sisters of Rome was 292 and had 29 houses: 16 in Italy, 4 in the United States, 8 in Madagascar and 1 in the Philippines. Their headquarters is at Via della Madonna del Riposo 71, 00165 Rome, Italy.

== See also ==
- Trinitarian Order
