= BioCubaFarma =

State-run biotech organization in Cuba

Coordinates: 23.0719°N 82.3992°W

- Headquarters: Avenida Independencia No. 8126, Havana, Cuba

BioCubaFarma is a Cuban state-run biotechnology organization. It is responsible for roughly 50% of all Cuban research activities. It was created by government decree in 2012, from a variety of already existing organizations.
