= Pedro González de Velasco =

Spanish physician and anthropologist (1815-1882)

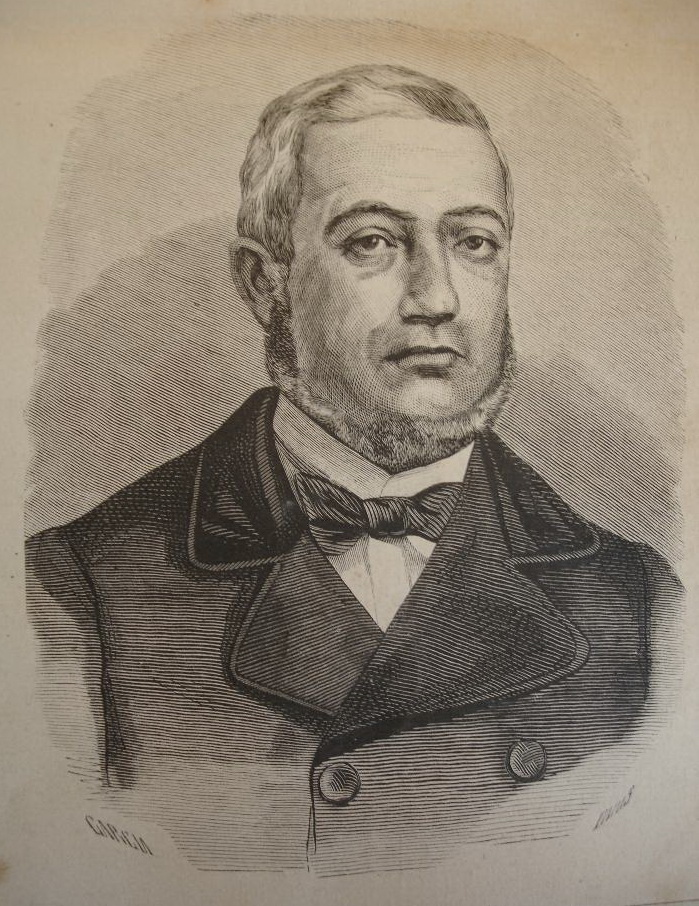
- Born: Pedro González de Velasco; 22 October 1815; Valseca, Segovia, Spain
- Died: 21 October 1882 (aged 66); Madrid, Spain
- Occupations: Physician; Anthropologist

Pedro González de Velasco (22 October 1815 – 21 October 1882) was a Spanish medical doctor, anthropologist, and founder of the Madrid's Museo Nacional de Antropología.

== Biography ==
=== Early life and education ===
Pedro González de Velasco was born in Valseca, Segovia, Spain on 22 October 1815. His surname, Velasco, is of Basque origin.

He began his early studies of Latin at the Seminary of Segovia, later studying philosophy in Ávila during the Ominous Decade.

He took up arms as a volunteer to support the Liberals and Queen Isabella II of Spain against the Carlists in the First Carlist War. On 18 October 1837 he entered Madrid and assumed an intern position at the Hospital de Santa Isabel in the city. In 1840, he began eleven years of medical studies. He completed three years as a surgeon, six as a medical surgeon, and two as a doctor, receiving his degree on 21 May 1864.

In July 1861, he was elected as an associate fellow to the College of Physicians of Philadelphia.

=== Anthropological Society of Madrid ===
Velasco founded the Anthropological Society of Madrid (Spanish: Sociedad Antropológica de la Madrid) in Spain. On 6 November 1864, a meeting at his Calle de Atocha home appointed an organizing committee, which officially founded the Society on 14 May 1865. A royal order legally established the society on 16 May.

=== National Museum of Anthropology ===
In 1875, Velasco founded Spain's first museum of anthropology, the National Museum of Anthropology (Spanish: Museo Nacional de Antropología) in Madrid. The museum housed Dr. Velasco's private collection which included exhibits of anatomy, botany, physical anthropology, and antiquities. He remained the director until his death.

== Death ==
Pedro González de Velasco died in Madrid, Spain on 21 October 1882.

== Gallery ==
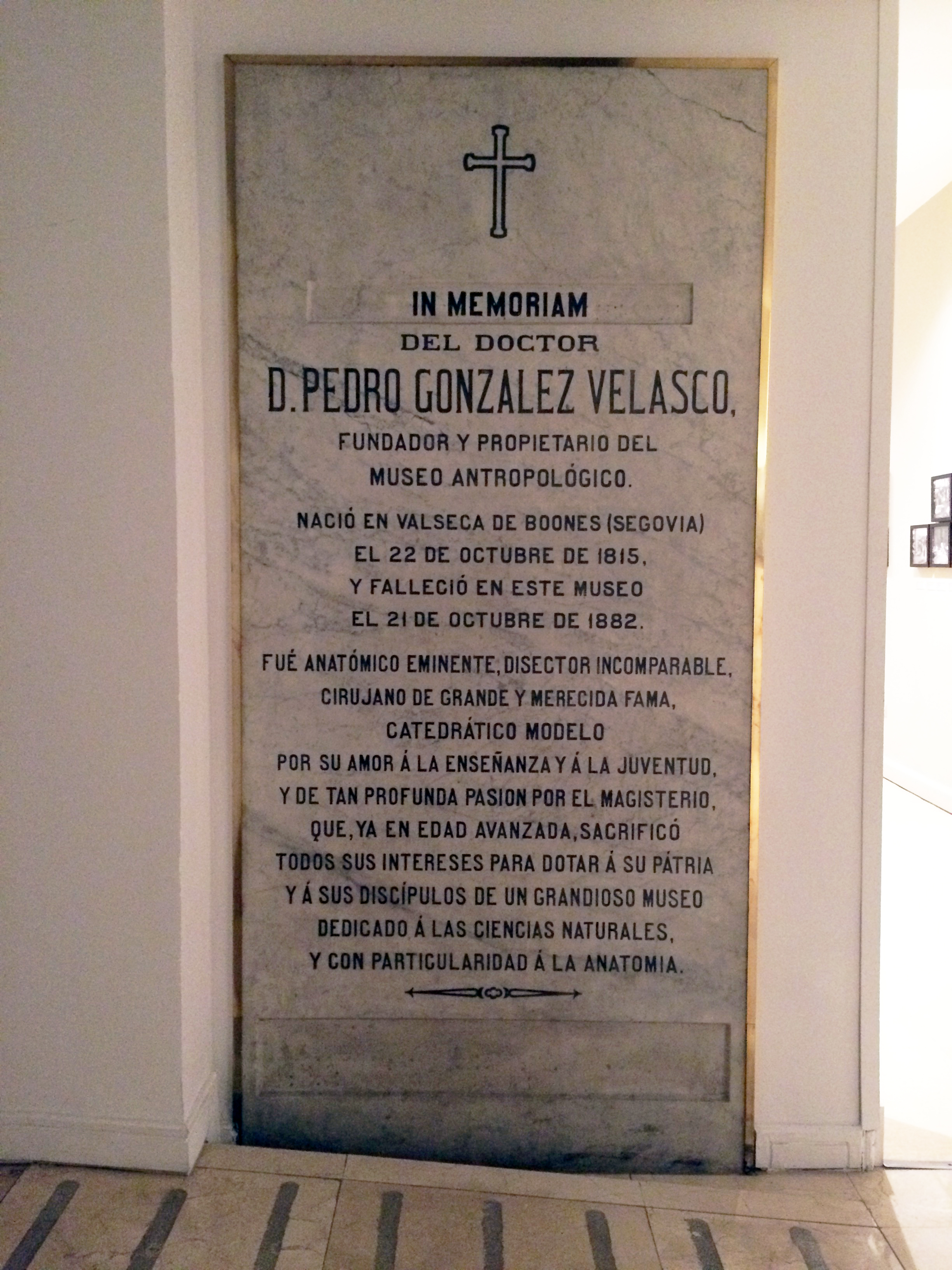
Gravestone of Dr. Pedro González de Velasco

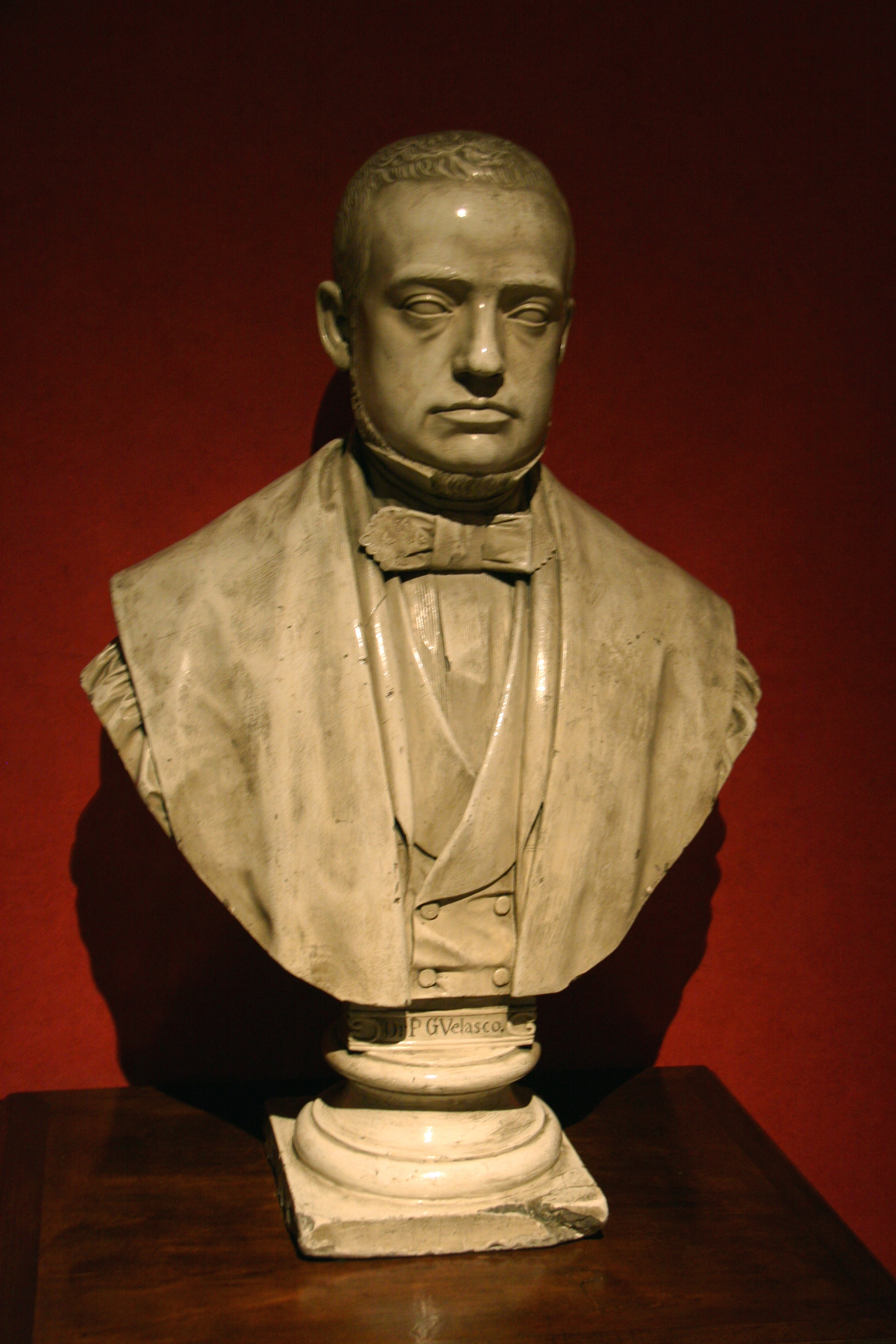
Bust of Dr. Pedro González de Velasco
