= Old Medicine School of San Carlos =

- Antigua Facultad de Medicina de San Carlos (Spanish)
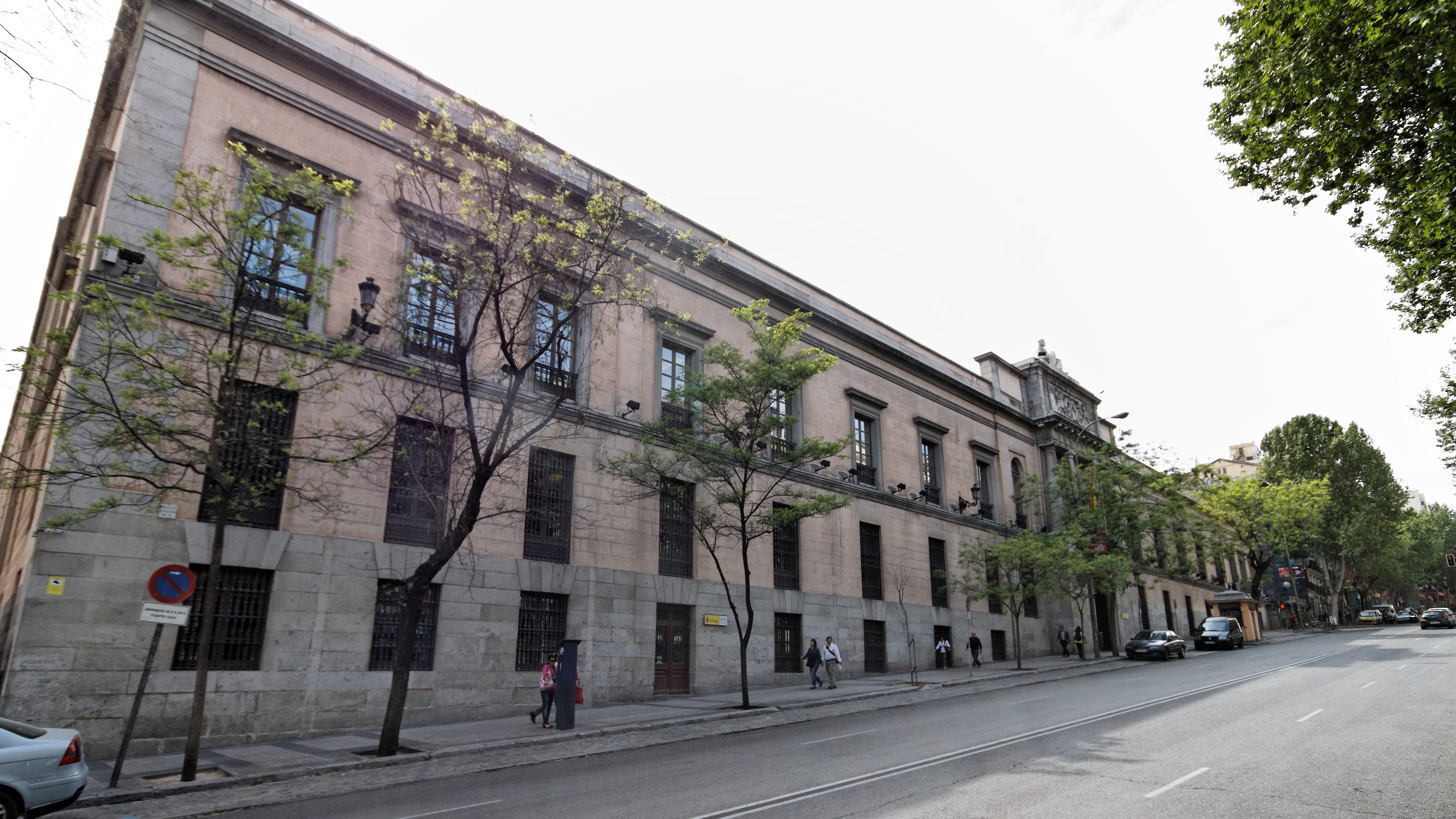

- Location within Spain
- 40.410034°N 3.694765°W
- Location: Madrid, Spain

Spanish Cultural Heritage
- Official name: Antigua Facultad de Medicina de San Carlos
- Type: Non-movable
- Criteria: Monument
- Designated: 1997
- Reference no.: RI-51-0010105

The Old Medicine School of San Carlos (Spanish: Antigua Facultad de Medicina de San Carlos) is a building located in Madrid, Spain. It was declared Bien de Interés Cultural in 1997.
