= International Medical Congress =

Scientific conferences on medicine (1867–1913)

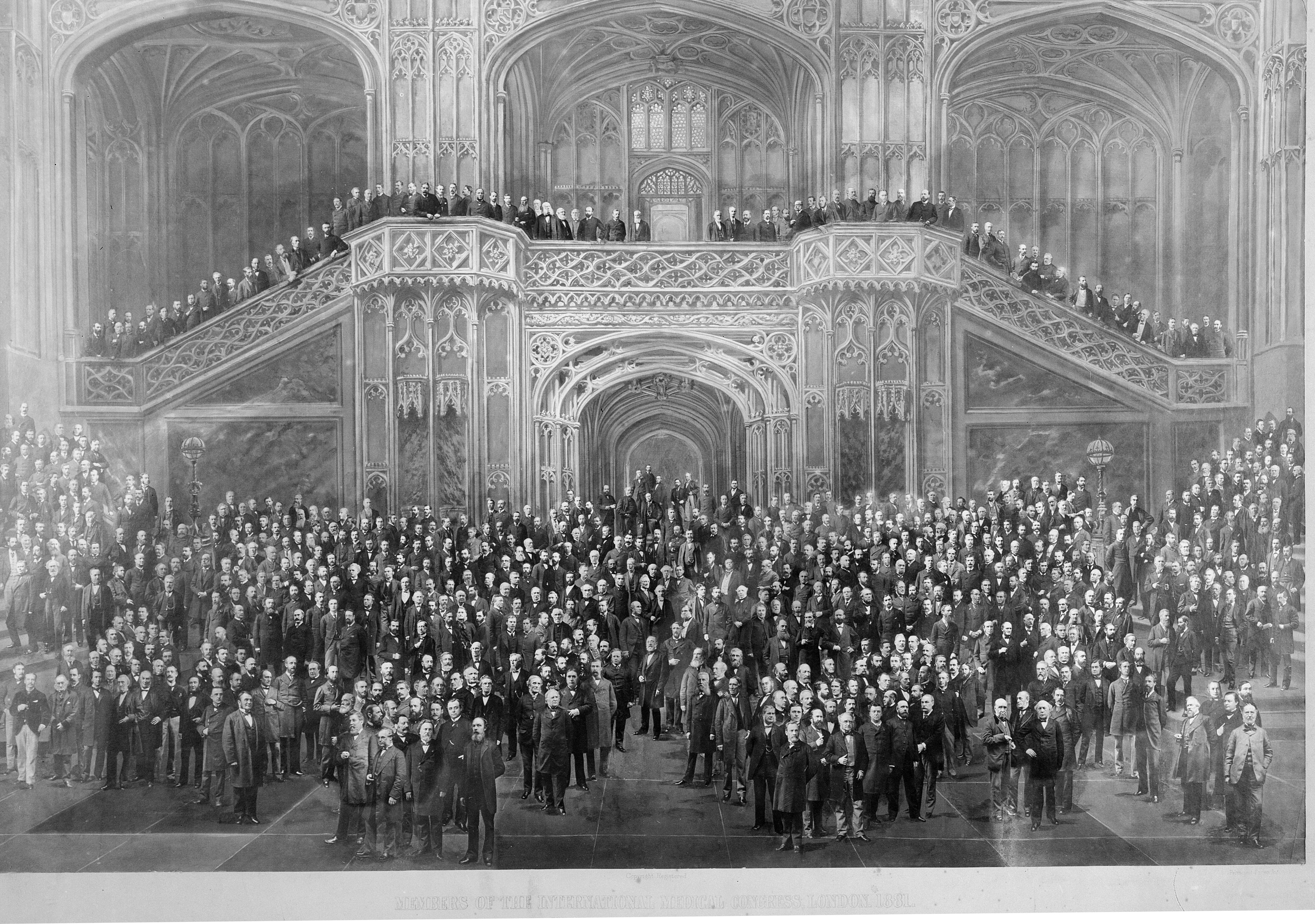
Composite group portrait of members of the International Medical Congress, 1881

The International Medical Congress (French: Congrès International de Médecine) was a series of international scientific conferences on medicine that took place, periodically, from 1867 until 1913.

The idea of such a congress came in 1865, during the third annual Medical Congress of France; Professor Henri Giutrac proposed holding an international medical conference in 1867, taking advantage of the fact that physicians and surgeons from all over the world would surely be in Paris to attend that year's International Exhibition. The first congress was a great success; it enjoyed the patronage of the French Government, having been officially attended by Victor Duruy, Minister of Public Instruction, and had several honorary members selected from foreign diplomatic bodies and learned societies.

== Congresses ==
Number	Year	Location	Notes
1st	1867	Paris, France	
2nd	1869	Florence, Italy	
3rd	1873	Vienna, Austria	
4th	1875	Brussels, Belgium	
5th	1877	Geneva, Switzerland	
6th	1879	Amsterdam, The Netherlands	
7th	1881	London, United Kingdom	The President of this Congress was Sir James Paget and the honorary secretary was William MacCormac. There were 3210 delegates.
8th	1884	Copenhagen, Denmark	The President of this Congress was Prof Peter Ludvig Panum. A nomenclature sounds on Auscultation was agreed in English, German and French.
9th	1887	Washington, D.C., United States	Secretary-General and, later, President: Nathan Smith Davis
10th	1890	Berlin, Germany	Held from 4th to the 9th of August, 1890
11th	1894	Rome, Italy	Held from 24 September to 1 October at a cost of 25 lire (£1).
12th	1897	Moscow, Russia	Held 19 -26 of August 1897. Transport from London to Moscow via Berlin and Warsaw and a return journey via St Petersburg Helsingfors, Stockholm, Copenhagen, Hamburg, and Flushing was arranged with Thomas Cook and Son for 45 guineas per person. There is a copy of the conference proceedings in French held by the Wellcome Trust. Which can be accessed here https://wellcomecollection.org/works/mehvfxh9
13th	1900	Paris, France	
14th	1903	Madrid, Spain	Held from 23 to 30 of April 1903. There was much in the British Medical press about routes to get to the Congress including a detailed explanation in The Lancet of both overland and sea routes. The Royal Mail Steam Packet Company offered doctors in Britain a 25% discount on the cost of the fare from Southampton to Lisbon. The South Eastern and Chatham Railway and the railway service in France also issued reduce price tickets for members wishing to attend the Congress. The Great Britain and Ireland Committee convened a meeting on 13 July 1903 with Frederick William Pavy as chair. They reported that 150 people attended from Britain and Ireland. The Great Britain and Ireland Committee were unhappy with the radical changes to the Constitution of the congress specifically article 2 "congress shall be composed of Medical Men, Pharmacists, veterinarian and other persons practicing one of the different branches of medical science.... and that anyone who holds a professional or scientific title shall be admitted to take part in the Congress on the same terms as medical men". The opinion of the Great Britain and Ireland Committee was that this made the Congress unwieldy due to the number of people.
15th	1906	Lisbon, Portugal	President: Manuel da Costa Alemão; Secretary-General: Miguel Bombarda
16th	1909	Budapest, Hungary	Held from 29 August to 4 September.
17th	1913	London, United Kingdom	Opened on 6 -12th 1913 by Prince Arthur of Connaught and was held at Royal Albert Hall. Sir Thomas Barlow was the president of this Congress. The Congress was notable for its strong support of Vivisection, calling for the introduction of Notifiable disease systems, calling for systematic diagnosis and treatment of Syphilis and acknowledging the role of diet in Beriberi . All delegates were given a golden medal, the obverse of which showed Joseph Lister who had died the year before.

== Proposed Congress ==
The 18th Congress was due to be held in Munich in 1917, as unanimously agreed by the permanent commission of the International Congress at the 17th Congress in 1913. The Bavarian government and LMU Munich offered to host it. In 1914, however, World War I began and the 18th Congress was cancelled.
