= Cuban Academy of Sciences =

State institution in Cuba

Coordinates: 23.135249°N 82.359652°W

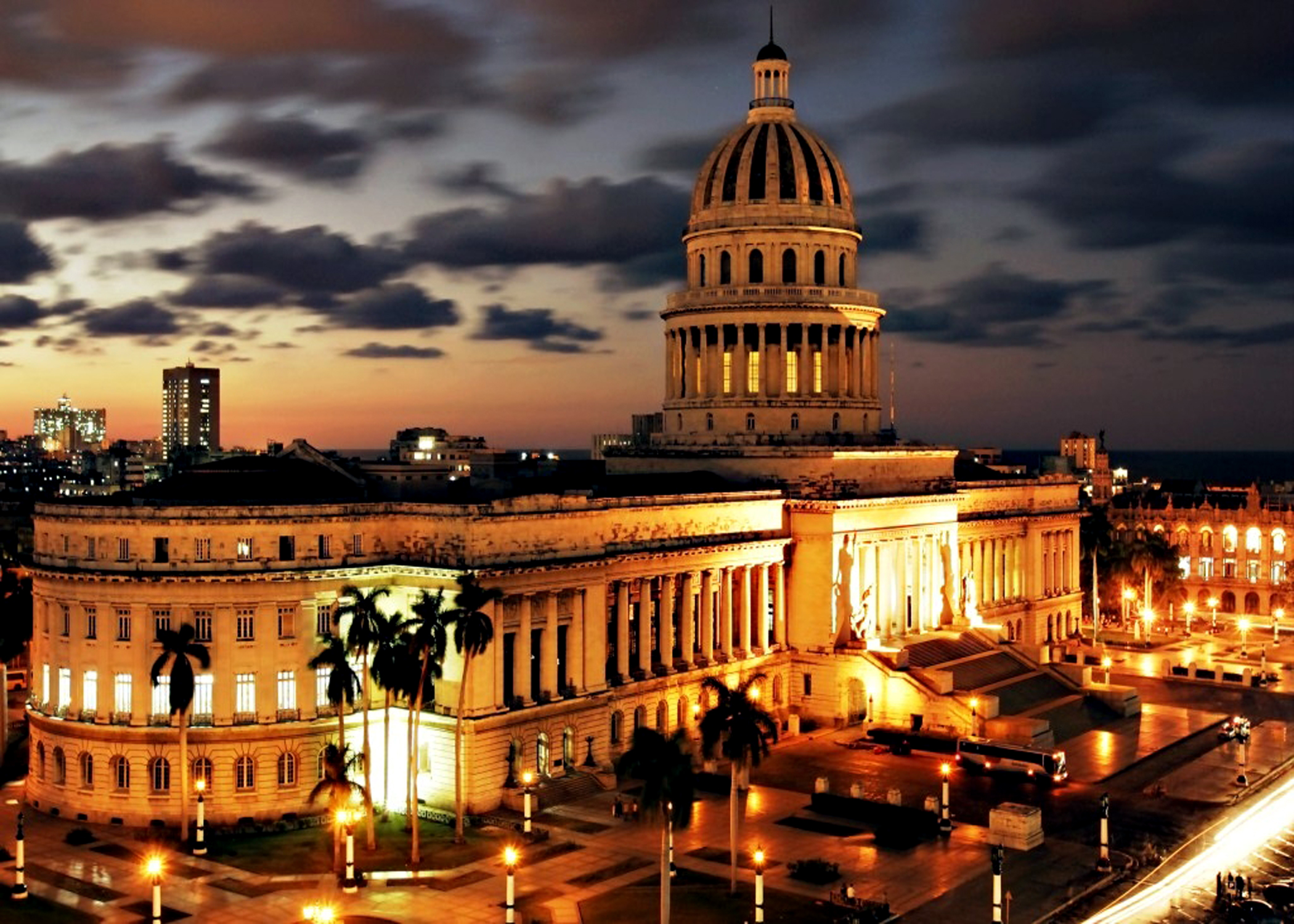
National Capitol building

The Cuban Academy of Sciences (Academia de Ciencias de Cuba) is an official institution of the Cuban state, with headquarters in the National Capitol building in Havana. It is described as the oldest active national academy of sciences outside Europe. The Academy is with a national scope, independent and consultative in the area of science, and the successor of the former Royal Academy of Medicine, Physical and Natural Sciences of Havana, and is also attached to the Ministry of Science, Technology and the Environment.

The Academy represents the fields of Agrarian and Fisheries Sciences, Biomedical Sciences, Exact, and Natural Sciences, Social Sciences and Humanities, and Technical Sciences. Its members are nominated by scientific research institutions, universities, scientific societies as well as various other national organizations.

== History ==
Cuba's first Academy of Sciences was founded by decree of Queen Isabella II of Spain on May 19, 1861, as the Royal Academy of Medical, Physical, and Natural Sciences of Havana. Its original headquarters now houses the Carlos J. Finlay Historical Museum of Sciences. In 1902 with the establishment of the Republic of Cuba, the word Royal was dropped from its title. In 1962 the Cuban government created the National Commission for the Academy of Sciences of Cuba, and in 1976 the Academy of Sciences of Cuba was established as a National Institute. In 1980 the Academy acquired the rank of a Ministry, encompassing all of the country's scientific and technological activity. In April 1996 it was established in its present form with a mission as follows: "to foster Cuban science, to disseminate national and universal scientific progress, to recognize the scientific research of excellence in the country, to raise ethic professional standards and social recognition of science, and to strengthen links between scientists and their organizations, both among themselves, with society at large, and with the rest of the world."

Over the last few decades, the Cuban Academy has worked with the U.S. Smithsonian Institution on scientific exchanges despite frayed political relations between the two nations.

== Awards ==
The Cuban Academy of Sciences presents the following awards:

- Award of the Academy of Sciences of Cuba
- Award of the Third World Academy of Sciences for Cuban Scientific Youth (TWAS).
- National Award of Critics
- National Award of Social Sciences
- Scientific Book Award

== See also ==
- Ministry of Science, Technology, and Environment of Cuba (CITMA)
