= Olfactory mucosa =

Portion of the nasal mucosa containing the nerve endings for smell

Details
- System: Olfactory system

Identifiers
- Latin: pars olfactoria tunicae mucosae nasi, regio olfactoria tunicae mucosae nasi
- MeSH: D009831

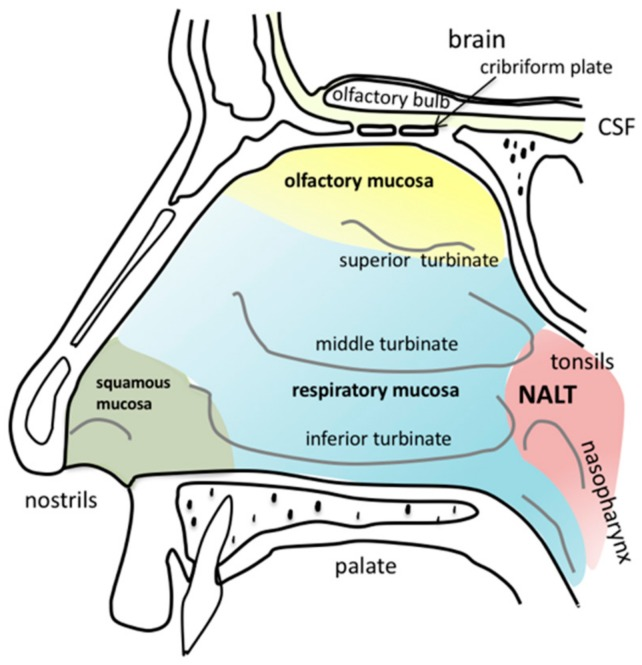
Anatomy of the human nasal cavity

The olfactory mucosa is the neuroepithelial mucosa lining the roof and upper parts of the septum and lateral wall of the nasal cavity which contains bipolar neurons of the primary receptor neurons of the olfactory pathway, as well as supporting cells. The neurons' dendrites project towards the nasal cavity while their axons ascend through the cribriform plate as the olfactory nerves.

The part of the nasal cavity that is lined with olfactory mucosa is known as the olfactory region (pars olfactoria tunicae mucosae nasi), while the rest of the nasal cavity that is lined by ordinary respiratory mucosa is known as the respiratory region.

== Structure ==
Olfactory mucosa lines about 5cm^{2} of the posterosuperior parts of the lateral nasal wall. Parts of the nasal cavity lined by olfactory mucosa include: parts of the roof of the nasal cavity, the superior nasal concha and some upper parts of the middle nasal concha, parts of the nasal septum, and the sphenoethmoidal recess.

The olfactory mucosa is thicker and lighter in colour (yellowish-brown) in comparison to the (pinkish) respiratory mucosa lining the rest of the nasal cavity.

Glands of the olfactory mucosa secrete a mostly serous fluid.

=== Histology ===
The olfactory mucosa consists of the olfactory epithelium and the underlying lamina propria, connective tissue containing fibroblasts, blood vessels, Bowman's glands and bundles of fine axons from the olfactory neurons.

In vertebrates, the olfactory epithelium consists of a three basic cell types: bipolar olfactory receptor neurons; sustentacular cells, a type of supporting cell; and basal cells, the stem cells that continuously give rise to new olfactory receptor neurons and sustentacular cells.

Electron microscopy studies show that Bowman's glands contain cells with large secretory vesicles. The exact composition of the secretions from Bowman's glands is unclear, but there is evidence that they produce odorant binding protein.

== Physiology ==
The mucus protects the olfactory epithelium and allows odors to dissolve so that they can be detected by olfactory receptor neurons.

== Research ==
Adult stem cell harvesting

Cells in the olfactory mucosa have been used in clinical trials for adult stem cell therapeutic treatments and successfully harvested for future applications.

CB1 receptors and obesity

Type 1 cannabinoid receptors (CB1 receptors) are present in the sustentacular cells of the olfactory mucosa, in the periglomerular cells of the olfactory bulb, and in the anterior olfactory nucleus and olfactory cortices. A study in 2008 in mice has shown that the level of CB1 expression in various brain regions, including the olfactory nucleus, is modulated by diet-induced obesity.

== See also ==
- Cannabinoid receptors
- Endocannabinoid system
