= Olfactory receptor neuron =

Sensory neuron that detects odorants

- Olfactory mucosa: mucus layer; cilia; olfactory sensory neurons; supporting cells; basal cells; Bowman's gland; olfactory nerve.

Details
- System: Smell
- Location: Olfactory epithelium in the nose
- Shape: Bipolar sensory receptor
- Function: Detect traces of chemicals in inhaled air (sense of smell)
- Neurotransmitter: Glutamate
- Presynaptic connections: None
- Postsynaptic connections: Olfactory bulb

Identifiers
- MeSH: D018034
- NeuroLex ID: nifext_116
- TH: H3.11.07.0.01003
- FMA: 67860

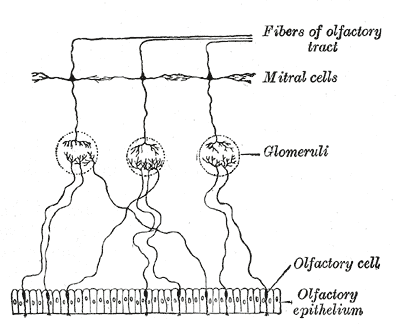
Plan of olfactory neurons

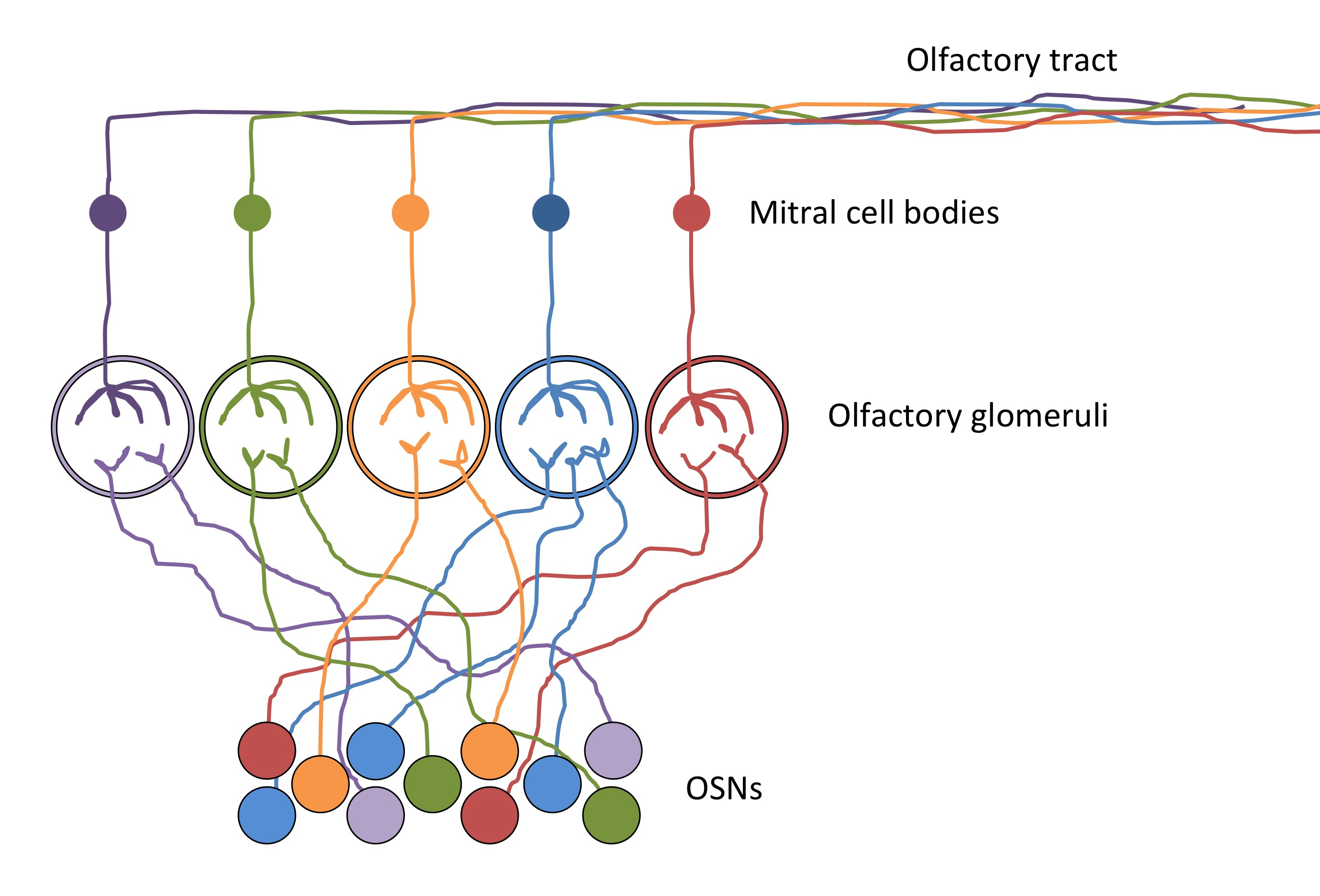
Olfactory sensory neurons (OSNs) express odorant receptors. The axons of OSNs expressing the same odorant receptors converge onto corresponding glomerular targets in the olfactory bulb, allowing for the organization of olfactory information.

An olfactory receptor neuron (ORN), also called an olfactory sensory neuron (OSN), is a sensory neuron within the olfactory system. ORNs are the principal neurons of the sense of smell: they detect volatile chemicals in inhaled air and convert that chemical signal into an electrical one that is relayed to the olfactory bulb of the brain. Unusually for neurons, ORNs are continually replaced throughout life from stem cells in the olfactory epithelium.

== Molecular discovery ==
A major advance in the molecular study of olfaction came in 1991, when Linda Buck and Richard Axel identified a large multigene family that they proposed encodes the odorant receptors, providing the first molecular handle on how ORNs detect odors. Buck and Axel received the 2004 Nobel Prize in Physiology or Medicine for their discoveries concerning odorant receptors and the organization of the olfactory system.

== Structure ==
Humans have between 10 and 20 million olfactory receptor neurons (ORNs). In vertebrates, ORNs are bipolar neurons within the pseudostratified olfactory epithelium of the nasal cavity. Each mature neuron extends a short apical dendrite to the epithelial surface, where it ends in a knob bearing non-motile cilia within the mucus. A slender unmyelinated axon extends from the basal pole, joins the olfactory nerve and passes through the cribriform foramina of the cribriform plate before terminating in a glomerulus of the olfactory bulb.

The olfactory epithelium contains sustentacular cells (supporting cells), which span the epithelium and support the ORNs, and basal cells near the basement membrane that act as progenitors. The olfactory glands (glands of Bowman) lie in the underlying lamina propria and secrete the mucus bathing the cilia through ducts that open onto the epithelial surface.

Many tiny hair-like non-motile cilia protrude from the olfactory receptor cell's dendrites. The dendrites extend to the olfactory epithelial surface and each ends in a dendritic knob from which around 20 to 35 cilia protrude. The cilia have a length of up to 100 micrometers and with the cilia from other dendrites form a meshwork in the olfactory mucus. The ORN dendrite integrates the receptor currents generated across these cilia. The ciliary membrane contains olfactory receptors, a family of G protein-coupled receptors. Many separate olfactory receptor cells express ORs that bind the same set of odors, and the axons of mature canonical ORNs expressing the same receptor converge onto corresponding glomeruli in the olfactory bulb.

Mature canonical ORNs generally express one allele of one OR gene. Chromatin-mediated silencing, enhancer interactions and receptor-dependent feedback help establish and stabilize this singular receptor choice. Because each OR recognizes multiple odorants and each odorant activates multiple ORs, the identity of an odor is encoded by the combination of receptors it activates. The orderly convergence of same-receptor axons onto dedicated glomeruli preserves this receptor information as a spatial map in the olfactory bulb.

=== Regeneration ===
Unlike most neurons, ORNs are continuously replaced throughout life. New ORNs are generated from globose basal cells in the olfactory epithelium, while horizontal basal cells act as a reserve stem-cell pool that is recruited after injury. Turnover is heterogeneous: some neurons are relatively short-lived, whereas mature neurons can persist for months, and the production of replacement neurons increases substantially after epithelial injury. Odorant-receptor gene expression begins as newly generated ORNs differentiate and mature, as demonstrated during olfactory-neuron regeneration in the catfish and characterized during maturation in mice. This lifelong neurogenesis is unusual among mammalian neurons and allows the olfactory epithelium to recover from environmental damage.

== Function ==
In vertebrate ORNs, odorant receptors are G protein-coupled receptors located mainly in the membrane of the olfactory cilia. There are approximately 1000 different genes that code for the ORs in the mouse, making them the largest gene family in the mammalian genome; humans have roughly 400 functional OR genes, the remainder having become pseudogenes. An odorant dissolves into the mucus of the olfactory epithelium and binds to an OR. Individual ORs can respond to multiple odorants, and a single odorant can activate multiple ORs, producing a combinatorial receptor code. Odorant binding activates the G protein G_{olf}; its α-subunit, encoded by GNAL, stimulates adenylyl cyclase type III (ACIII) to produce cyclic AMP (cAMP). cAMP opens cyclic nucleotide-gated (CNG) channels, admitting Na^{+} and Ca^{2+}. The rise in intracellular Ca^{2+} opens calcium-activated chloride channels, including TMEM16B/ANO2, and because olfactory neurons maintain a high internal chloride concentration, Cl^{−} flows out of the cell, amplifying the depolarization and promoting action potential firing.

The main olfactory epithelium also expresses smaller, distinct families of chemosensory receptors in subsets of neurons. Trace amine-associated receptors (TAARs) form a second class of receptors in the olfactory epithelium that detect volatile amines. Distinct from the ORNs of the main olfactory epithelium, the vomeronasal organ (accessory olfactory system) of many vertebrates contains its own sensory neurons expressing unrelated families of putative pheromone receptors.

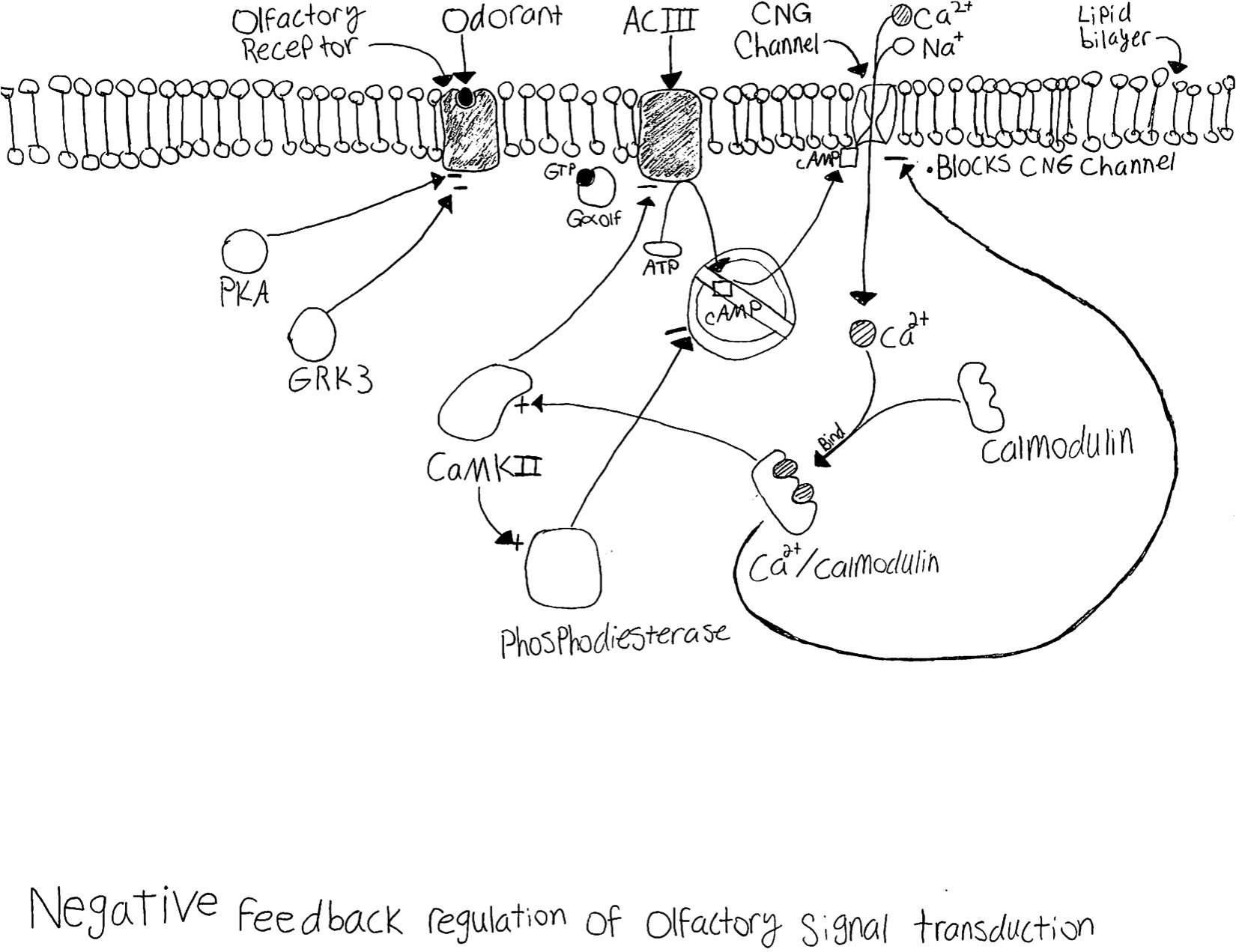
Desensitization of olfactory neuron

=== Desensitization ===
The olfactory receptor neuron has a fast working negative feedback response upon depolarization. When the neuron is depolarizing, the CNG ion channel is open allowing sodium and calcium to rush into the cell. Calcium entering through the CNG channels then promotes adaptation through several feedback pathways. Ca^{2+} binds to calmodulin, and the resulting Ca^{2+}–calmodulin complex reduces the sensitivity of the CNG channel, limiting further sodium and calcium influx. CaMKII, activated by Ca^{2+}–calmodulin, can phosphorylate ACIII and reduce cAMP production, while phosphodiesterases degrade cAMP. Together these mechanisms reduce the neuron's responsiveness during sustained or repeated stimulation.

=== Number of distinguishable odors ===
A widely publicized study suggested that humans can discriminate more than one trillion olfactory stimuli. This finding has been disputed. Critics argued that the methodology used for the estimation was fundamentally flawed, showing that applying the same argument for better-understood sensory modalities, such as vision or audition, leads to wrong conclusions. Other researchers argued that the formula used actually yields an upper bound rather than the lower bound reported, so the calculation supports "at most" one trillion, and is extremely sensitive to the precise details of the calculation, with small variations changing the result over tens of orders of magnitude, possibly going as low as a few thousand. The authors of the original study have argued that their estimate holds as long as it is assumed that odor space is sufficiently high-dimensional.

== Other animals ==
The number of functional olfactory receptor genes varies widely among species and contributes to differences in the range of chemicals their olfactory systems can represent. Mice have roughly 1,000 functional OR genes, whereas humans have only about 400, with many other mammals falling between these values. Receptor-gene number alone, however, does not determine olfactory sensitivity or discrimination: despite their smaller receptor repertoire, humans can outperform rodents and dogs for particular odorants.

=== Insects ===
Insects also detect odors with olfactory receptor neurons, but their receptors are unrelated to the vertebrate GPCR family. Insect odorant receptors are heteromeric complexes of a variable odor-specific Or subunit and a conserved co-receptor (Orco), and they function mainly as ligand-gated ion channels. A metabotropic, cyclic-nucleotide-activated component has also been reported, so the relative contribution of the two pathways is not fully settled. The ionotropic signaling of these receptors is fast and direct.

=== Dogs ===
Compared to humans, dogs have a larger number of olfactory receptor neurons and a larger olfactory bulb, resulting in a remarkably sensitive sense of smell, which is used by law enforcement to detect dangerous and illegal substances and biological scents, as well as by agricultural and conservation scientists to detect other living organisms, such as plant parasites, endangered animals, invasive species and even microorganisms.

== Clinical significance ==
Olfactory dysfunction, including reduced smell (hyposmia) and loss of smell (anosmia), is estimated to affect 3–20% of the population; risk increases with age and dysfunction can follow chronic sinonasal disease, head trauma, upper-respiratory infection or neurodegenerative disease. Because ORNs are exposed directly to the inhaled environment, the olfactory epithelium is vulnerable to such damage and infection. In COVID-19, the viral-entry proteins ACE2 and TMPRSS2 are expressed mainly by non-neuronal sustentacular cells rather than by ORNs. Infection of sustentacular cells can induce epithelial inflammation, damage olfactory cilia and reduce the expression of odorant receptors and olfactory signal-transduction proteins. Persistent post-COVID-19 smell loss has been associated with continued immune-cell infiltration and altered gene expression in the olfactory epithelium, and may also involve dysfunction of ORNs, the olfactory bulb and the olfactory cortex.

== See also ==
- Chemoreceptor
- Sensory receptor
- List of distinct cell types in the adult human body
