= Airway basal cell =

Airway basal cells are found deep in the respiratory epithelium, attached to, and lining the basement membrane.

Basal cells are the stem cells or progenitors of the airway epithelium and can differentiate to replenish all of the epithelial cells including the ciliated cells, and secretory goblet cells. This repairs the protective functions of the epithelial barrier.

Basal cells are cuboidal with a large nucleus, few organelles, and scattered microvilli. Basal cells are the first cells to be affected by exposure to cigarette smoke. Their disorganisation is seen to be responsible for the major airway changes that are characteristic of COPD.

== Structure ==
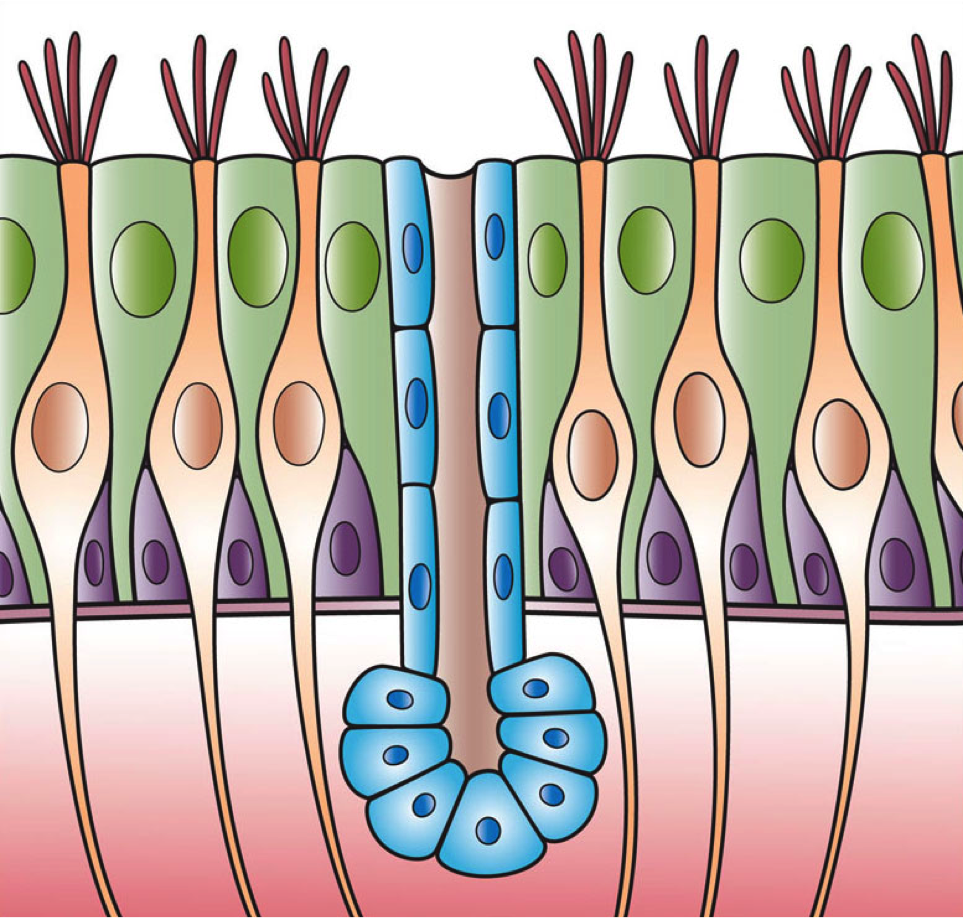
Cells of the respiratory epithelium. Basal cells shown in purple, ciliated cells shown in brown, goblet cells shown in green, and submucosal gland shown in blue.

Basal cells are cuboidal, with a large nucleus, few organelles, and scattered microvilli. Basal cells are attached to, and line the basement membrane.

The numbers of basal cells are highest in the large airways and become increasingly decreased in the smaller airways. Their percentage in the trachea is 34%, in the large bronchi 27%, and 10% in the larger of the bronchioles. Basal cells can express a number of different receptors, notably EGFR.

Basal cell derived precursors are found as intermediate cells (also known as parabasal, or indetermined cells) between the basal cells and the differentiated cells.

== Function ==
Basal cells are the stem cells, or progenitors of all the cells in the respiratory epithelium. The ciliated cells and secretory cells that form the epithelial barrier, and function in mucociliary clearance, are terminally differentiated meaning that they cannot self-renew. These cells are vulnerable to damage and the basal cells can replace damaged cells by differentiation.

Typically the airway epithelium turns over fairly slowly with the basal cells in a quiescent state, and just a few intermediate cells being seen. In response to damage to the differentiated cells, or to stress caused by smoking, the basal cells become active, proliferate, and form clonal patches, and the numbers of intermediate cells increase. When activated the basal cells acquire damage-associated phenotypes to enable differentiation to the particular cell type that has been damaged. The intermediate cells differentiate under the control of FOXJ1 into ciliated cells; and into secretory cells under the control of Notch signalling, and the transcription factors SPDEF and FOXA3. The regeneration of cells can be normal or in the case of smokers the regeneration may be of altered histologic phenotypes.

Basal cells can also provide a defence function upregulating innate immune mediators such as RNase7, an antimicrobial protein. RNase7, mediates tissue repair, and the production of inflammatory cytokines induced either by tobacco smoke, or by microbial pattern recognition. This is seen as a possible defence response of basal cells to injury that would be associated with microbial attack. The response requires signalling via EGFR, which is highly expressed in basal cells. Other innate immune mediators include beta-defensin 2, and lipocalin-2; pro-inflammatory cytokines, interleukins IL6, and IL8; and chemokine CCL20.

=== Dysfunction ===
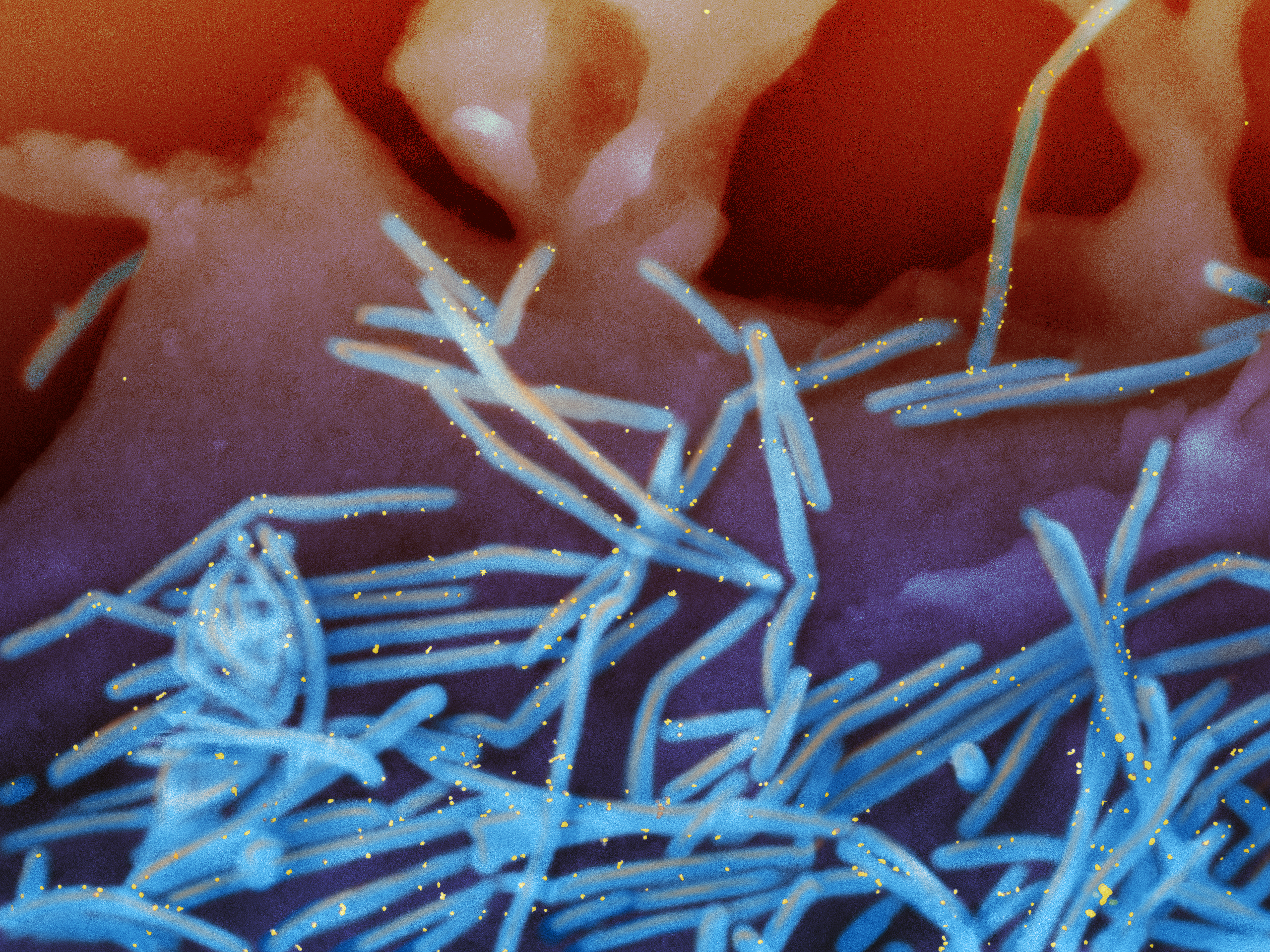
SEM image of syncytial virions taken from A549 cells in the lung epithelium.

Following injury to airway epithelium, the basal cells can become infected by the respiratory syncytial virus. When this happens the basal cell can be skewed to favour the differentiation of mucus-producing (secretory goblet cells) over that of ciliated cells. The normal ratio of ciliated cells to secretory cells is 10 to 1, and this is highly controlled throughout most of the respiratory tree. When this ratio is upset in this way, the effect is of generating the mucus hyperplasia associated with a number of respiratory diseases, due to the insufficient ciliary action needed for mucociliary clearance. The release of antimicrobials may occur as a second-line defence with cell differentiation.

Disruption of the tight-junction barrier is a common feature of asthma, and of smoking-related respiratory diseases. The persistent activation of the innate immune response in basal cells, may contribute to the characteristic chronic inflammation seen in these disorders.

== Clinical significance ==
The hyperplasia of airway basal cells is the earliest indication of smoking-related abnormality in the lung. This is followed by shortened cilia, loss of ciliated cells, mucous cell hyperplasia, and loss of cell junctions giving a leaky epithelial barrier. With persistent stress from smoking, the basal cells become disarranged and lose their regenerative ability needed to repair the barrier. The disorganised basal cells are seen to be responsible for the major airway changes that are characteristic of COPD, and with continued stress can undergo a malignant transformation. Studies have shown that the initial development of emphysema is centred on the early changes in the airway epithelium of the small airways. Basal cells become further deranged in a smoker's transition to clinically defined COPD.

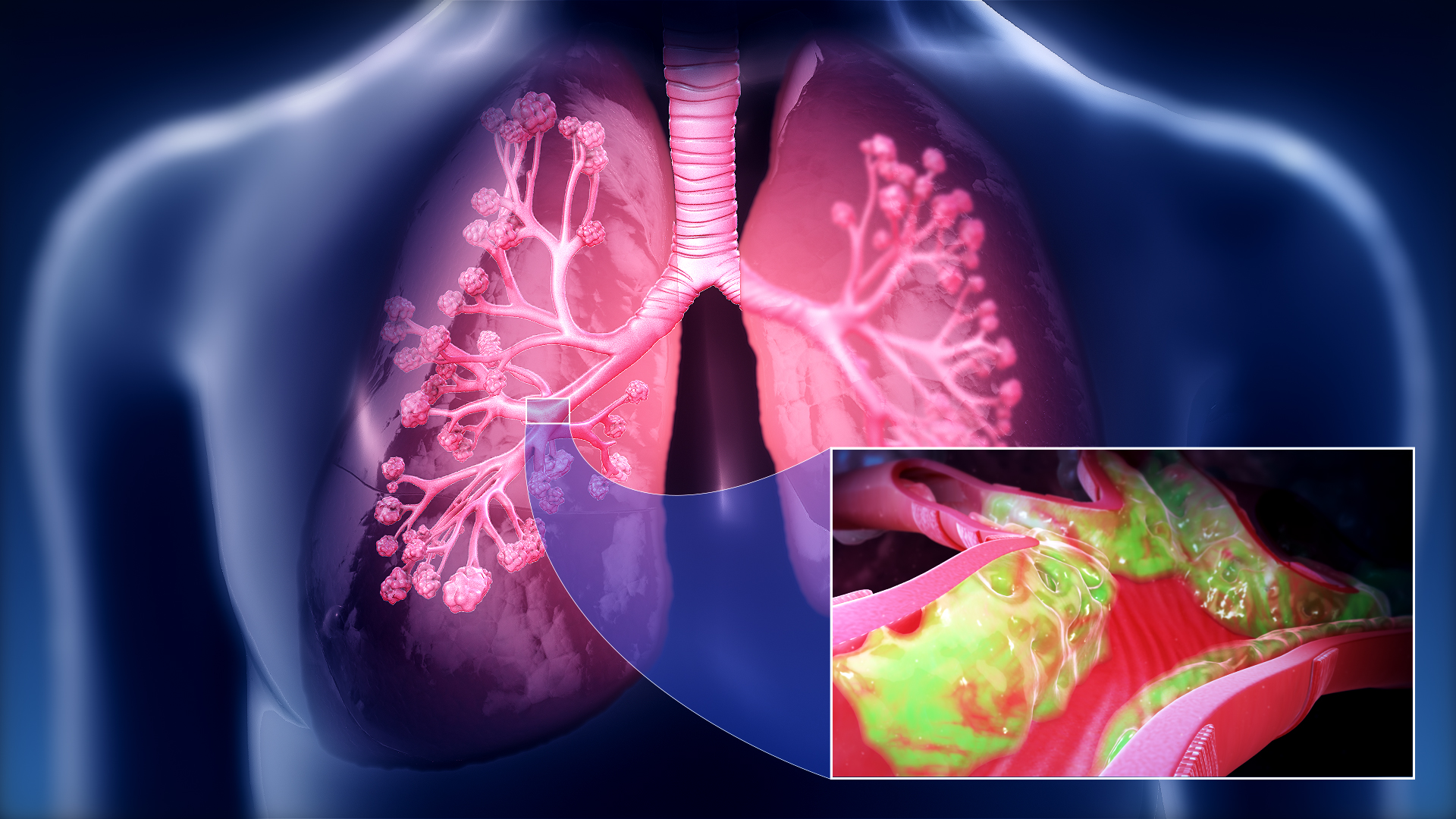
Image showing the accumulation of mucus in the airways.

Basal cell dysfunction causes the overproduction and secretion of mucus, and decreased mucus clearance that leads to the characteristic features of mucus hypersecretion, and productive cough of chronic bronchitis and chronic obstructive pulmonary disease (COPD). Mucus accumulation in COPD influences lung function, quality of life, exacerbations, hospital stays, and mortality, for the worse.

In response to a viral infection the basal cells may be activated to produce an increased production of Interleukin 33 and mucins, and these activated cells may become a long-lived population that promote chronic inflammation; as can influence the occurrence of an exacerbation of COPD.
