= Basal cell =

General cell type

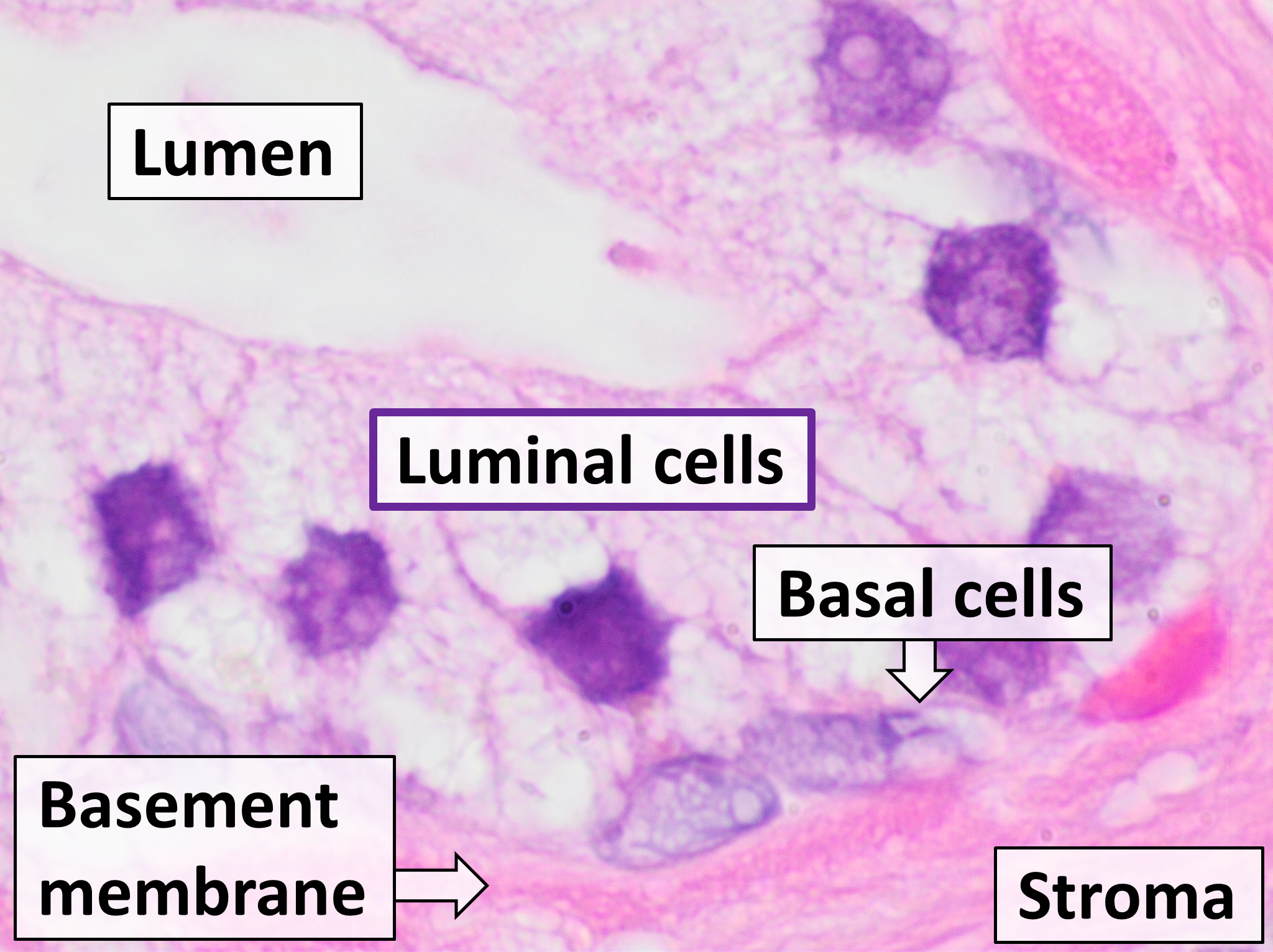
A microscopic image of a prostate gland featuring an example of basal cells

A basal cell is a general cell type that is present in many forms of epithelial tissue throughout the body. Basal cells are located between the basement membrane and the remainder of the epithelium, effectively functioning as an anchor for the epithelial layer and an important mechanism in the maintenance of intra-organ homeostasis.

Basal cells can interact with surrounding cells including neurons, the basement membrane, columnar epithelium, and underlying mesenchymal cells. They also engage in interactions with dendritic, lymphocytic, and inflammatory cells, with the majority of these interactions occurring in the lateral intercellular gap between basal cells.

Basal cells have important health implications since the most common types of skin cancer are basal cell and squamous cell carcinomas. More than 1 million instances of these cancers, referred to as non-melanoma skin cancers (NMSC) are expected to be diagnosed in the United States each year, and the incidence is rapidly increasing. Basal and squamous cell malignancies, while seldom metastatic, can cause significant local damage and disfigurement, affecting large sections of soft tissue, cartilage, and bone.

== Location ==
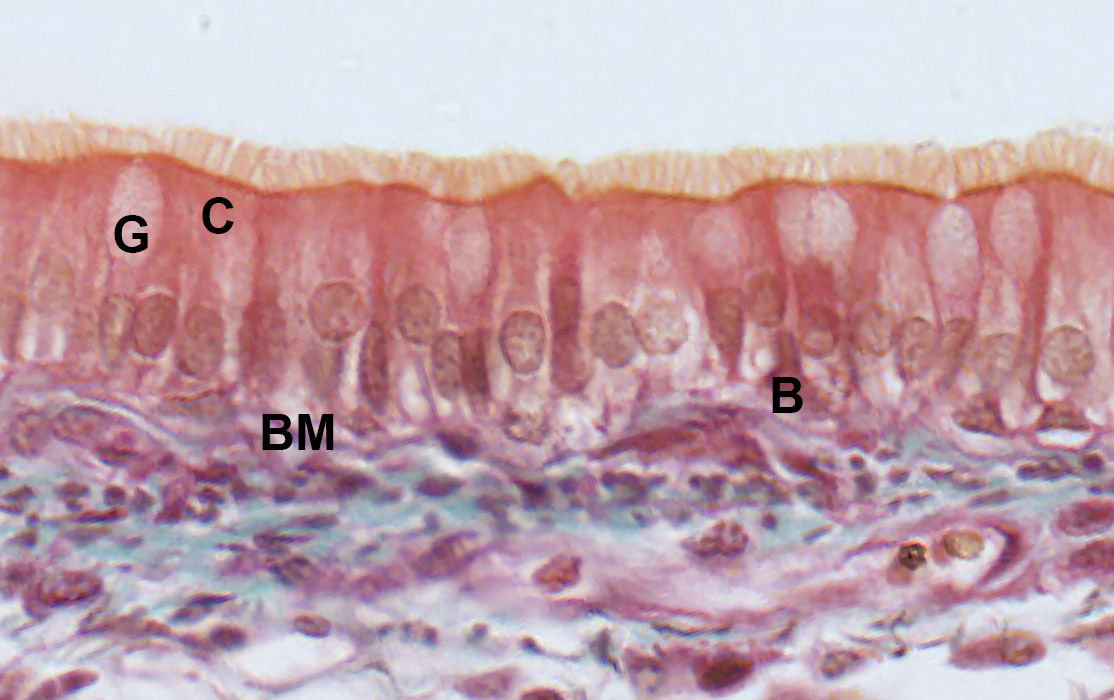
A microscopic image of the human trachea, showcasing the typical location of basal cells (B) between the basement membrane (BM) and the remaining epithelium

Basal cells are located in various tissues throughout the body. They are located at the bottom of epithelial tissues, generally situated directly on top of the basal lamina, above the basement membrane and below the remainder of the epithelium. Examples include:

- Epidermal cells in the stratum basale
- Airway basal cells, which are respiratory cells located in the respiratory epithelium (found in decreasing concentrations as airway diameter decreases)
- Basal cells of prostate glands
- Basal cells of the Gastrointestinal tract mucosal layer

== Structure ==
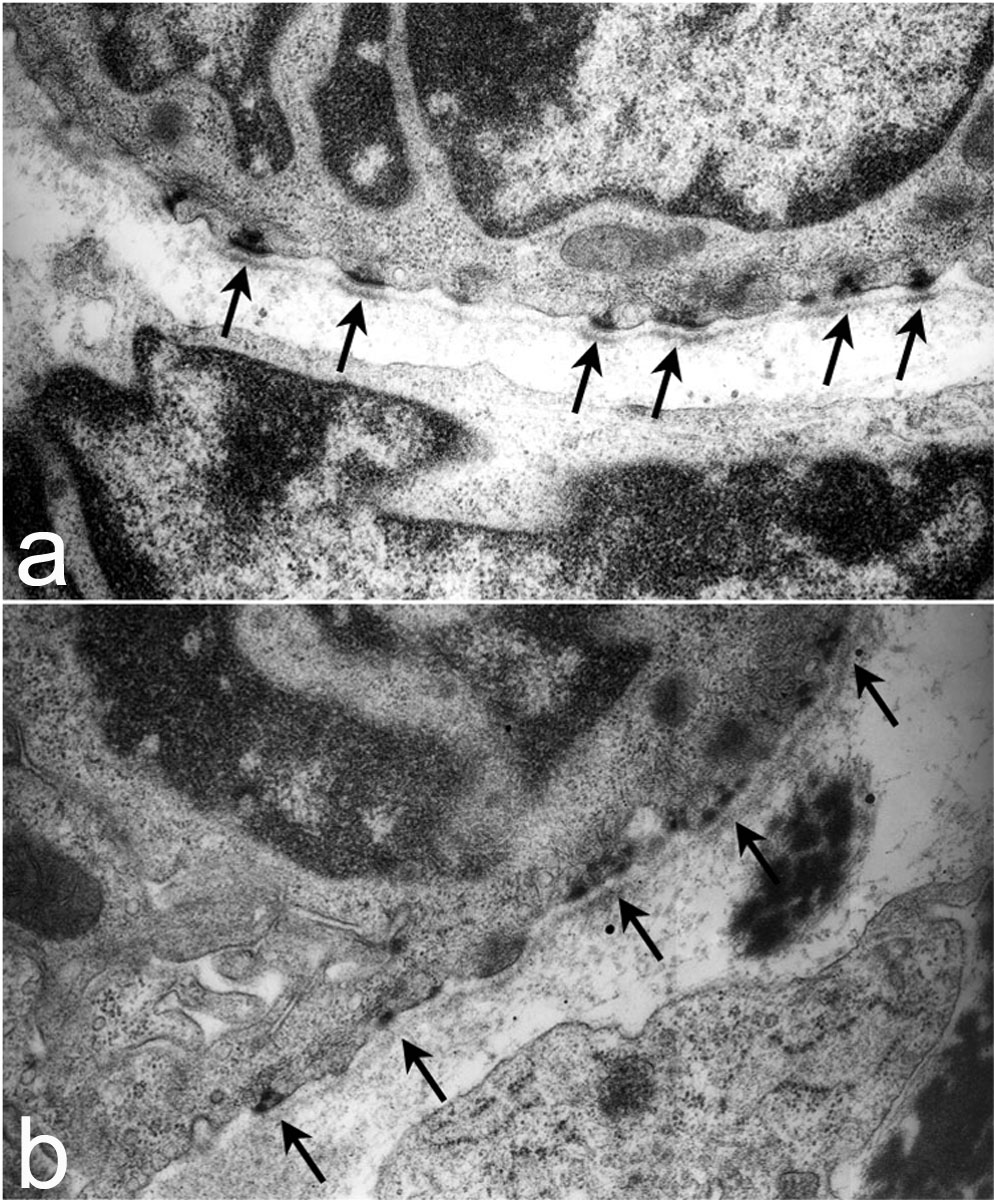
TEM image of the tracheal basal lamina in mice. The darkened areas with the arrows pointing to them display the location of hemidesmosomes connecting the layer of basal cells to the basal lamina.

Regardless of their specific location, basal cells generally share a similar basic structure. They are all usually either cuboidal, polyhedral or pyramidal shaped cells with enlarged nuclei and minimal cytoplasm. Basal cells are bound to each other by desmosomes, and to the basal lamina of the basement membrane by hemidesmosomes. These junctions help to create one tightly bound, continuous tissue layer that can endure mechanical stress and effectively function as a connection between the basement membrane and remaining epithelial tissue.

== Function ==
Basal cells serve two main functions in cells. They serve:

1. To anchor and connect the epithelium to the basement membrane
2. As the main stem cell population for the tissue they are found in, therefore responding to stimuli to maintain homeostasis within that tissue

While all basal cells, regardless of location, function similar in regards to anchoring the epithelium, the specific function and mechanisms of basal cells as stem cells varies by location. In general, basal cells can function as either unipotent or multipotent stem cells.

=== Epidermal basal cells ===
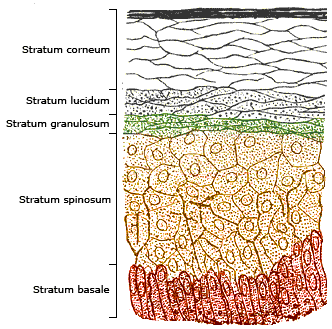
A diagram displaying the layers of the epidermis, with basal cells comprising the stratum basale.

In the epidermis, basal cells function as unipotent stem cells. Found in the lowest layer of the epidermis, the stratum basale, basal cells continuously divide in order to replenish the squamous cells that make up the skin's surface. Every time a basal cell divides, it creates two daughter cells, one is an identical basal cell, and the other is a new somatic cell that undergoes terminal differentiation. These cells gradually get pushed up through the layers of the epidermis by the constant proliferation of more new cells, gradually differentiating and flattening as they rise. This ultimately results in functional squamous cells on the outermost layer of the epidermis, the most abundant of which are called keratinocytes.

The continuous division of epidermal basal cells leads to complete epidermal turnover every 40–56 days in humans and every 8–10 days in mice.

This process of proliferation and differentiation is regulated by multiple genetic and environmental factors including a calcium gradient, Vitamins A and D, epidermal growth factor (EGF), transcription factor p63, and transforming growth factor alpha (TGF-α).

Errors in the regulatory mechanisms of epidermal basal cells can cause a variety of acute and chronic ailments including psoriasis and basal cell carcinoma, which is the most common type of skin cancer, accounting for 80% of all skin cancer cases. Due to the structural importance of the epidermis, defects in basal cell proliferation and differentiation can also contribute to deformities such as cleft lips and Gorlin syndrome.

=== Respiratory basal cells ===
In the respiratory tract, basal cells function as multipotent stem cells, capable of replenishing all of the epithelial cell types including secretory, ciliated, and intermediate cells. They reside in the mucosal layer of the respiratory epithelium, and generally remain dormant. However, when a functional epithelial cell becomes damaged, a basal cell is activated to differentiate into the appropriate cell type and replace the damaged cell.

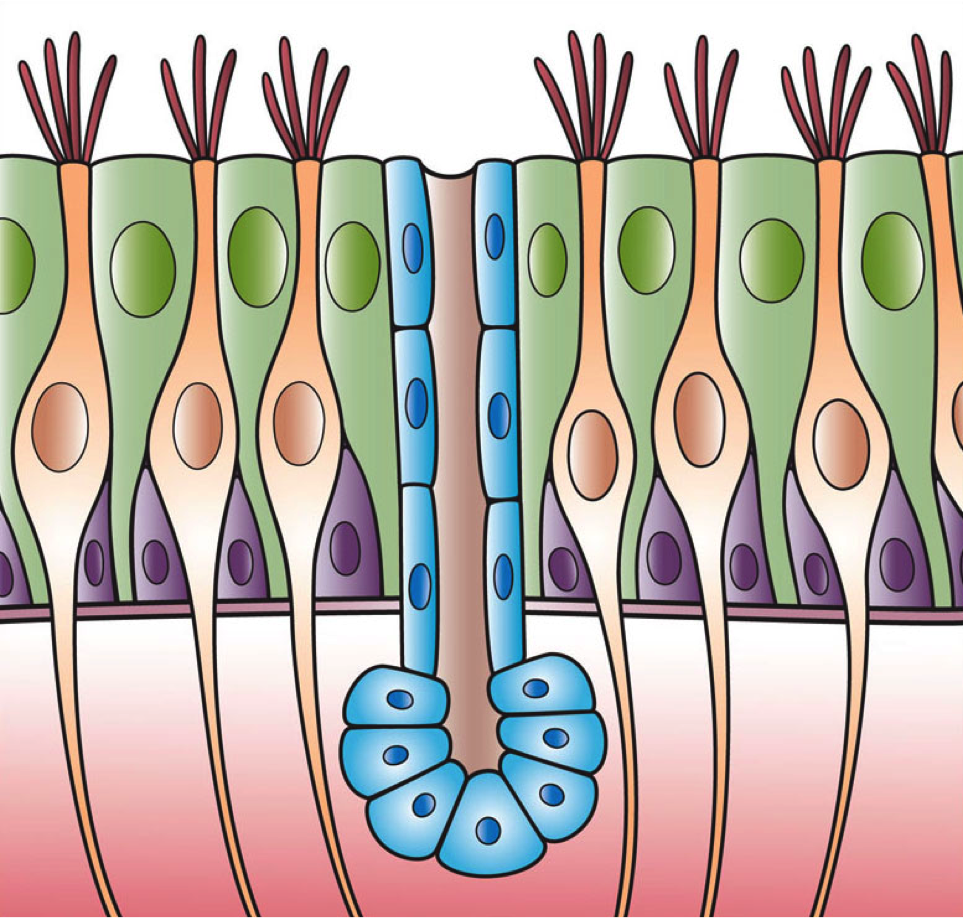
A diagram of cells in the respiratory epithelium. Basal cells are shown in purple, ciliated cells shown in brown, goblet cells are shown in green, and submucosal (below the epithelium) glands are shown in blue.

In addition to functioning as stem cells, there is novel evidence to suggest that undifferentiated basal cells also contribute immune functions of the respiratory epithelium by secreting RNase. This function helps to preserve the immune capabilities of the respiratory epithelium even when it is damaged and in the process of being repaired.

In the respiratory epithelium, there exists a layer of intermediate cells between the basal and differentiated cells. These intermediate cells exist in a transient state. They have begun the process of differentiation, but are not yet terminally differentiated, and as such can differentiate as needed, but have limited proliferative capacity. They play an important role in ensuring that the epithelium can be quickly repaired in response to damage.

The process of respiratory basal cell differentiation is regulated by multiple factors including transcription factors such as FOXJ1, FOXA3, Sox2, and p53, proteins such as LEF-1, and interleukins IL-1α and IL-33, as well as other cytokines. However, the primary control of basal respiratory cell differentiation is the Notch signaling pathway, which is the main determinant of what the basal cell differentiates into. High levels of NOTCH activity leads to differentiation into a secretory cell, whereas low levels lead to differentiation into a ciliated cell.

=== Gastrointestinal basal cells ===
The gastrointestinal tract consists of the esophagus, stomach, small intestines, and large intestines, and each layer is lined with distinct yet similar epithelium that necessarily contains basal cells. While the general function of these basal cells is similar throughout the entire tract, the specific mechanisms, functions, and products of these cells can vary depending on which layer the cells are located in. For example, while basal cells in both the esophagus and the stomach function as multipotent progenitor cells, they are fundamentally different because the esophageal basal cells exist as a part of a stratified squamous epithelium, whereas the gastric basal cells exist as a part of a simple columnar epithelium. Functionally, this means that since a simple epithelium is only one cell thick, differentiated cells must diffuse along the plane of the basement membrane rather than vertically through the rest of the epithelium. Furthermore, the actual products of these cells vary substantially, as esophageal basal cells mainly produce squamous epithelial cells, which function as a passive physical barrier between the lumen of the esophagus and underlying tissues, but gastric basal cells differentiate into a variety of secretory and absorptive cells that provide the main functions of the stomach including absorptive cells, chief cells, and parietal cells.

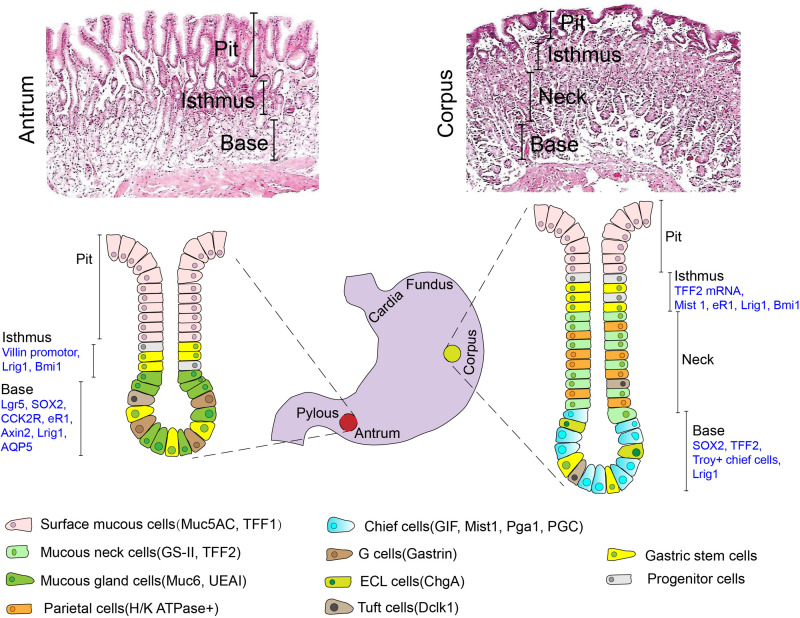
Diagram and histological examples showing the structure of gastric glands in different areas of the stomach. Note how the progenitor cells (which in this case is a term synonymous with basal cells) are located in the isthmus region of the pit in both examples, and how there is a single layer of cells that comprises the epithelium.

In the stomach, basal cells are generally located in the isthmus region, or near the top, of gastric glands, a location that allows them to easily differentiate within the gland and then diffuse bi-directionally as they differentiate, going either to the above gastric pit or the base of the gastric gland to replenish damaged cells. Due to the harsh environment created by the acidic interior of the stomach, the basal cells propagate continuously, relying on a variety of pathways and signaling molecules to communicate what type of cells have been damaged and need to be replaced. These regulators of proliferation and differentiation include the protein Sox9, the Wnt and Notch signaling pathways, BMP's 2, 4, and 7 (which can all function as tumor suppressors), and EGF. These processes exist in a delicate state, and any errors in or disruptions of these pathways can cause a variety of ailments. For example, a Helicobacter pylori infection can cause an overexpression of EGF which leads to excessive differentiation of basal cells into gastrin cells, which in turn can lead to atrophic gastritis, a well studied precursor to gastric cancer. Furthermore, if the genes coding for Jag1 or Jag2 are mutated or deleted, this can cause a disruption of the critical Notch signaling pathway, which can in turn cause uncontrolled and unregulated growth and differentiation leading to tumorigenesis.

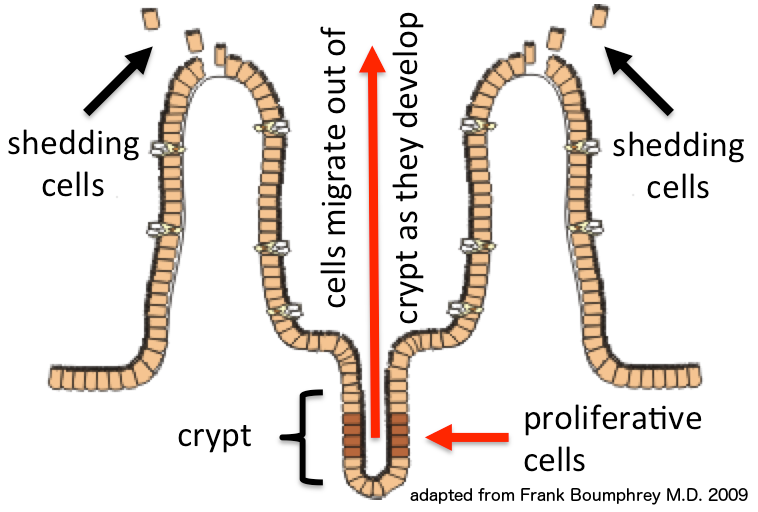
Diagram showing the location of intestinal crypts and the gradual migration of differentiating cells out of the crypt.

Similar to gastric basal cells, intestinal basal cells are continuously propagating. In fact, due to the vital role that the small intestine plays in nutrient absorption, basal cells in the small intestine exhibit the highest turnover rate of any cells in the body, creating an entirely new epithelium approximately every 5–7 days. Within the intestines, basal cells are located at the base of intestinal invaginations known as crypts, where they are nourished and protected by paneth cells and the surrounding microenvironment. These basal cells then function as multipotent progenitors, capable of differentiation into six distinct cell types, regulated by mechanisms very similar to those seen in other gastrointestinal basal cells. As the cells differentiate, they migrate out from the crypt towards the lumen, until eventually dying and being released into the intestinal lumen, only to soon be replaced by a new cell.
