= Olfactory glands =

Protein- and mucus-secreting glands in the olfactory mucosa

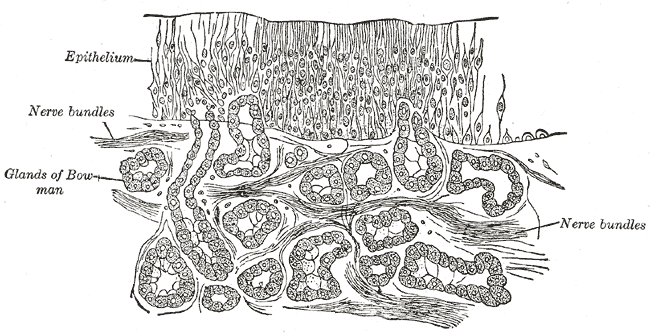
- Section of the olfactory mucous membrane

Details
- System: Olfactory system

Identifiers
- Latin: glandulae olfactoriae
- TA98: A15.1.00.003
- TA2: 6733
- TH: H3.05.00.0.00026
- FMA: 77659

Olfactory glands, also known as Bowman's glands, are a type of nasal gland situated in the part of the olfactory mucosa beneath the olfactory epithelium, that is the lamina propria, a connective tissue also containing fibroblasts, blood vessels and bundles of fine axons from the olfactory neurons.

An olfactory gland consists of an acinus in the lamina propria and a secretory duct going out through the olfactory epithelium.

Electron microscopy studies show that olfactory glands contain cells with large secretory vesicles. Olfactory glands secrete the gel-forming mucin protein MUC5B. They might secrete proteins such as lactoferrin, lysozyme, amylase and IgA, similarly to serous glands. The exact composition of the secretions from olfactory glands is unclear, but there is evidence that they produce odorant-binding protein.

== Function ==
The olfactory glands are tubuloalveolar glands surrounded by olfactory receptors and sustentacular cells in the olfactory epithelium. These glands produce mucus to lubricate the olfactory epithelium and dissolve odorant-containing gases. Several olfactory binding proteins are produced from the olfactory glands that help facilitate the transportation of odorants to the olfactory receptors. These cells exhibit the mRNA to transform growth factor α, stimulating the production of new olfactory receptor cells.

== See also ==
- William Bowman
- List of distinct cell types in the adult human body
