= Mucociliary clearance =

Mechanism in the respiratory system

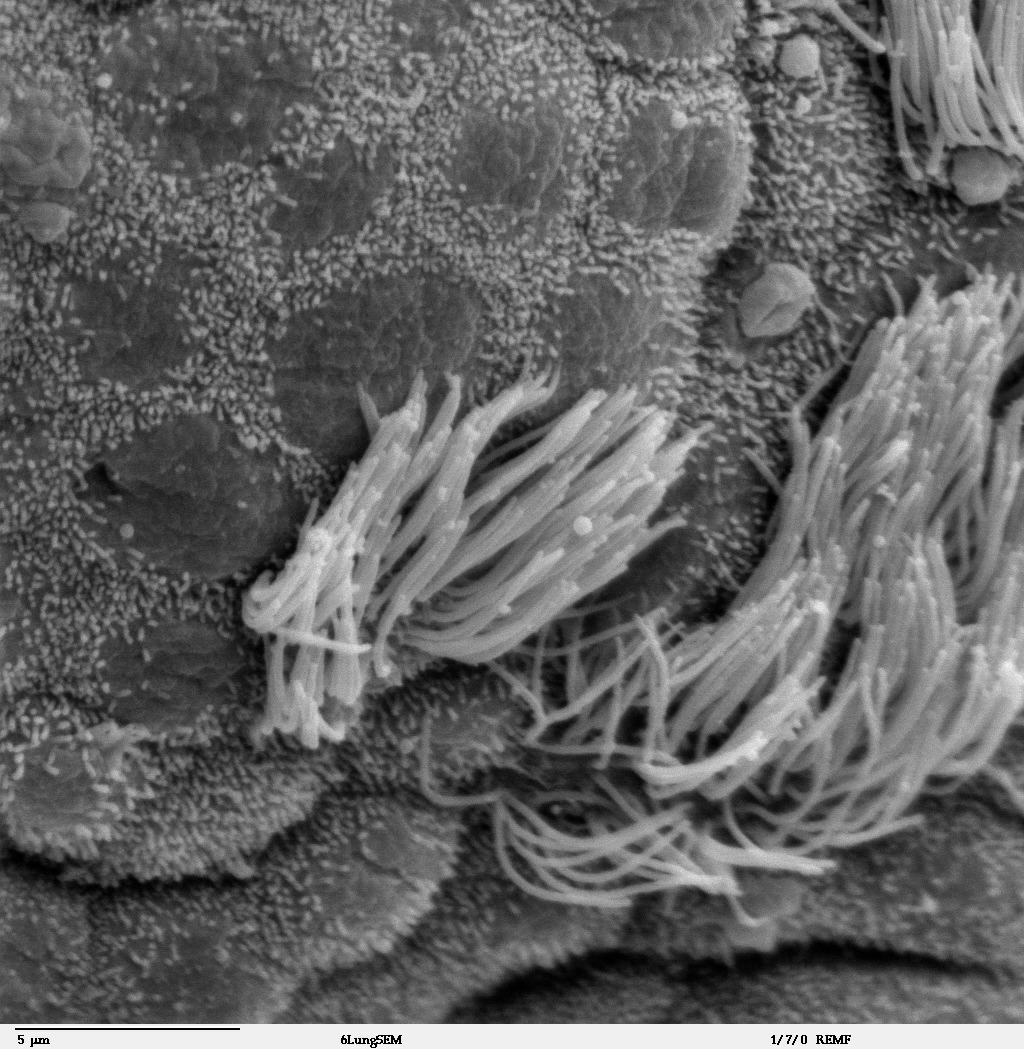
- Ciliated epithelium in bronchus with short microvilli on non-ciliated cells

Details
- System: Respiratory system

Identifiers
- MeSH: D009079

Mucociliary clearance (MCC), mucociliary transport, or the mucociliary escalator describes the self-clearing mechanism of the airways in the respiratory system. It is one of the two protective processes for the lungs in removing inhaled particles including pathogens before they can reach the delicate tissue of the lungs. The other clearance mechanism is provided by the cough reflex. Mucociliary clearance has a major role in pulmonary hygiene.

MCC effectiveness relies on the correct properties of the airway surface liquid produced, both of the periciliary sol layer and the overlying mucus gel layer, and of the number and quality of the cilia present in the lining of the airways. An important factor is the rate of mucin secretion. The ion channels CFTR and ENaC work together to maintain the necessary hydration of the airway surface liquid.

Any disturbance in the closely regulated functioning of the cilia can cause a disease. Disturbances in the structural formation of the cilia can cause a number of ciliopathies, notably primary ciliary dyskinesia. Cigarette smoke exposure can cause shortening of the cilia.

== Function ==
In the upper part of the respiratory tract, the nasal hair in the nostrils traps large particles, and the sneeze reflex may also be triggered to expel them. The nasal mucosa also traps particles preventing their entry further into the tract. In the rest of the respiratory tract, particles of different sizes become deposited along different parts of the airways. Larger particles are trapped higher up in the larger bronchi. As the airways become narrower only smaller particles can pass. The branchings of the airways cause turbulence in the airflow at all of their junctions where particles can then be deposited and they never reach the alveoli. Only very small pathogens are able to gain entry to the alveoli. Mucociliary clearance functions to remove these particulates and also to trap and remove pathogens from the airways, in order to protect the delicate lung parenchyma, and also to provide protection and moisture to the airways.

Mucociliary clearance also takes part in pulmonary elimination, which with exhalation removes substances discharged from the pulmonary capillaries into the alveolar space.

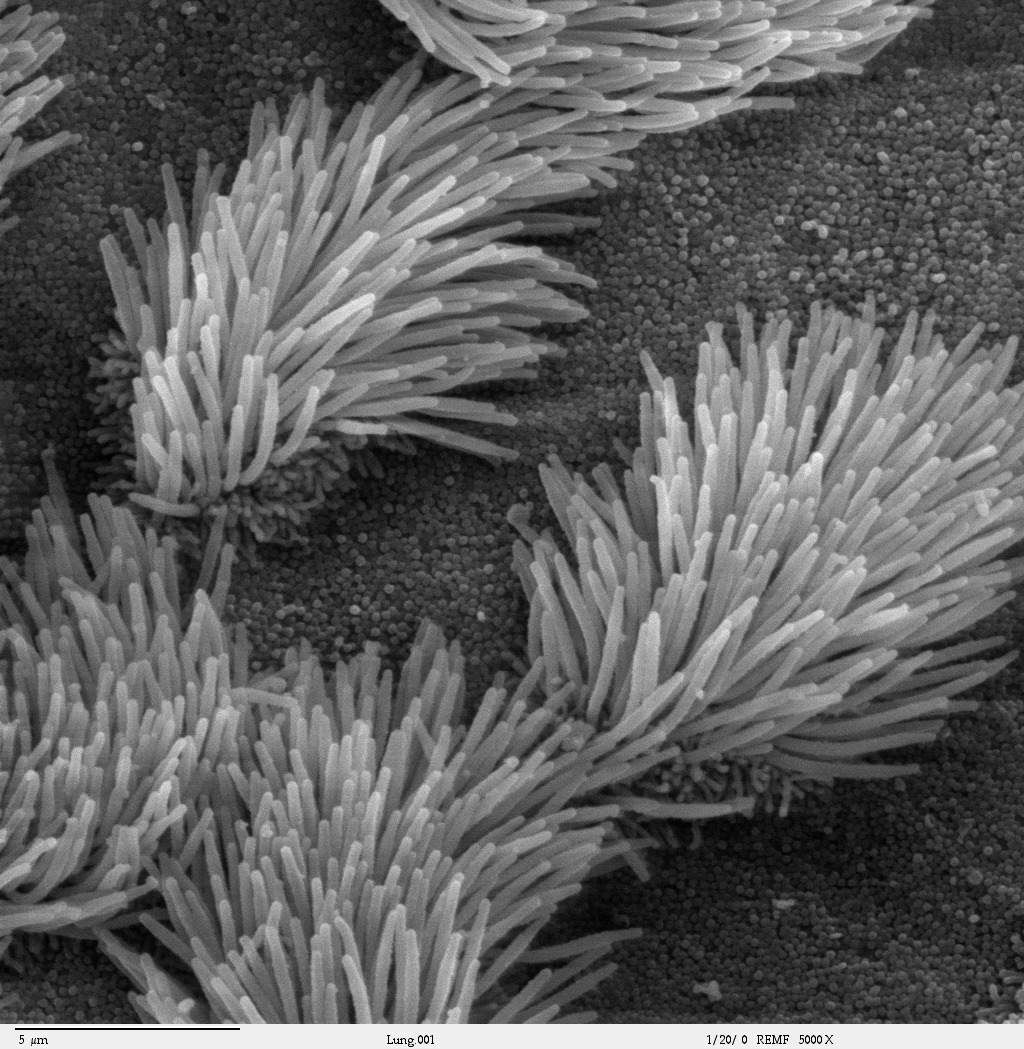
Scanning electron micrograph of the cilia projecting from respiratory epithelium in the trachea involved in mucociliary clearance.

=== Components ===
In the respiratory tract, from the trachea to the terminal bronchioles, the lining is of respiratory epithelium that is ciliated. The cilia are hair-like, microtubular-based structures on the luminal surface of the epithelium. On each epithelial cell there are around 200 cilia that beat constantly at a rate of between 10 and 20 times per second.

The cilia are surrounded by a periciliary liquid layer (PCL), a sol layer that is overlain with the gel layer of mucus. These two components make up the epithelial lining fluid (ELF), also known as the airway surface liquid (ASL), the composition of which is tightly regulated. The ion channels CFTR, and ENaC work together to maintain the necessary hydration of the airway surface liquid. An important factor is the rate of mucin secretion. The mucus helps maintain epithelial moisture and traps particulate material and pathogens moving through the airway, and its composition determines how well mucociliary clearance works.

=== Mechanism ===
Within the thin periciliary liquid layer the cilia beat in a coordinated fashion directed to the pharynx where the transported mucus is either swallowed or coughed up. This movement towards the pharynx is either upward from the lower respiratory tract or downwards from the nasal structures clearing the mucus that is constantly produced.

Each cilium is about 7 μm in length, and is fixed at its base. Its beat has two parts: the power stroke, or effector stroke, and the recovery stroke. The movement of the cilia takes place in the periciliary liquid which is a little shorter in depth than the height of an extended cilium. This allows the cilia to penetrate the mucous layer during its full extension in the effector stroke, and to propel the mucus directionally, away from the cell surface. In the recovery stroke the cilium bends from one end to the other bringing it back to the starting point for the next power stroke. The returning cilia bend to immerse completely in the PCL which has the effect of reducing a reverse movement of mucus.

Cilia movement in a metachronal wave.

The coordinated movement of the cilia on all the cells is carried out in a fashion that is not clear. This produces wave-like motions that in the trachea, move at a speed of between 6 and 20 mm per minute. The wave produced is a metachronal wave that moves the mucus. Many mathematical models have been developed in order to study the mechanisms of ciliary beating. These include models to understand the generation and rhythm of the metachronal wave, and the generation of the force in the effective stroke of the cilium.

== Clinical significance ==
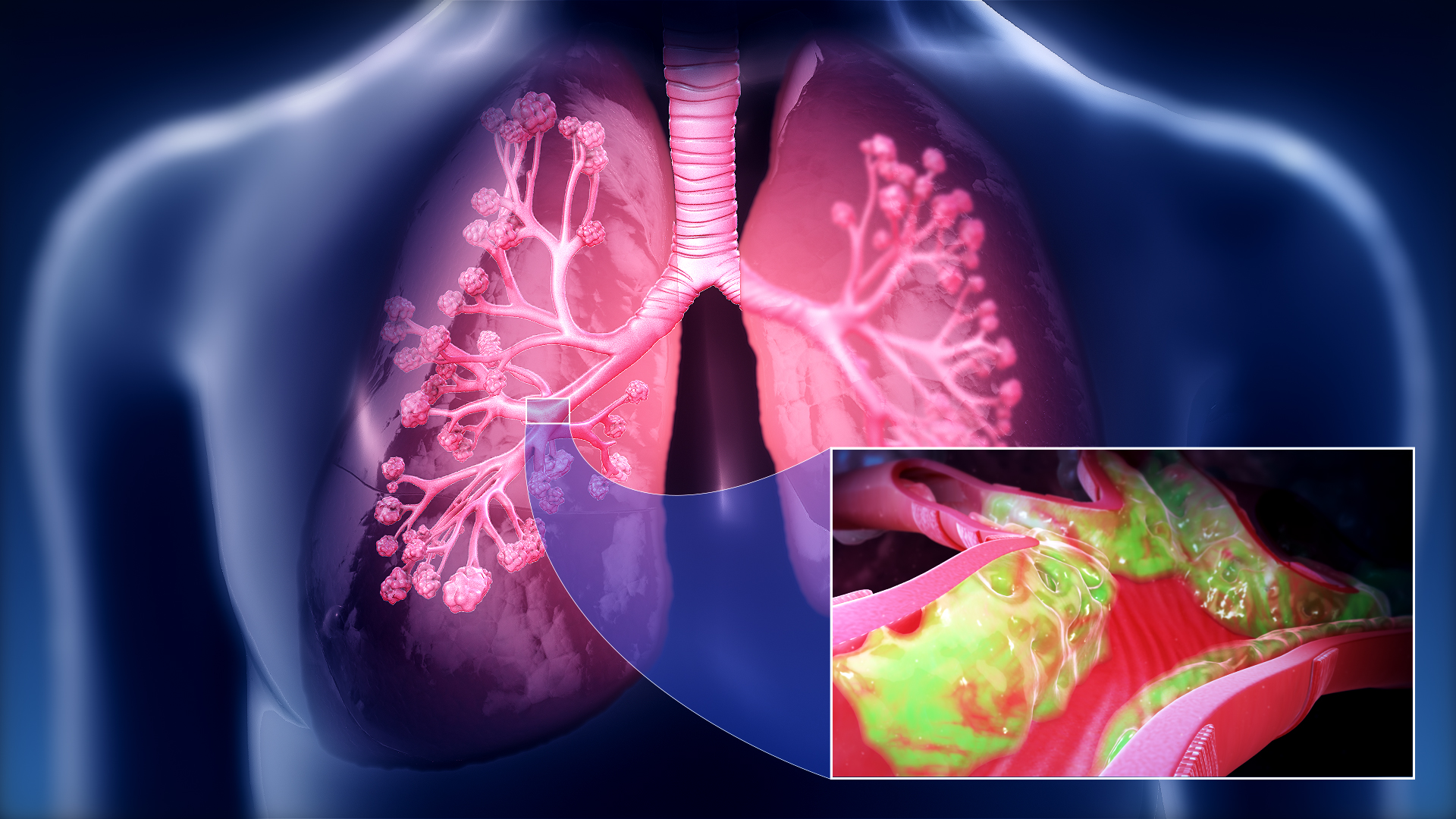
Accumulated mucus in the airways resulting from impaired mucociliary clearance, that may involve mucus hypersecretion.

Effective mucociliary clearance depends on a number of factors including the numbers of cilia, and their structure particularly their height, and the quality of the mucus produced that needs to be maintained at a correct humidity, temperature, and acidity.

The cilia need to be able to move freely in the periciliary liquid layer and when this is impaired through damage to the cilia or by imbalances in the moisture or pH of the PCL, the mucus is unable to be cleared properly from the airways. Cystic fibrosis is a consequence of imbalances in the PCL. Accumulated mucus, apart from causing varying degrees of airflow obstruction, makes a breeding ground for bacteria that cause many respiratory infections that can seriously worsen existing lung disorders. Obstructive lung diseases often result from impaired mucociliary clearance that can be associated with mucus hypersecretion and these are sometimes referred to as mucoobstructive lung diseases. Studies have shown that the dehydration of airway surface liquid is enough to produce mucus obstruction even when there is no evidence of mucus hypersecretion.

=== Humidity ===
High humidity enhances mucociliary clearance. One study in dogs found that mucus transport was lower at an absolute humidity of 9 g water/m^{3} than at 30 g water/m^{3}. Two methods of supporting this, particularly in mechanical ventilation, are provided by active and passive respiratory gas humidifiers.

== See also ==
- Airway clearance therapy
