= Respiratory epithelium =

Mucosa that serves to moisten and protect the airways

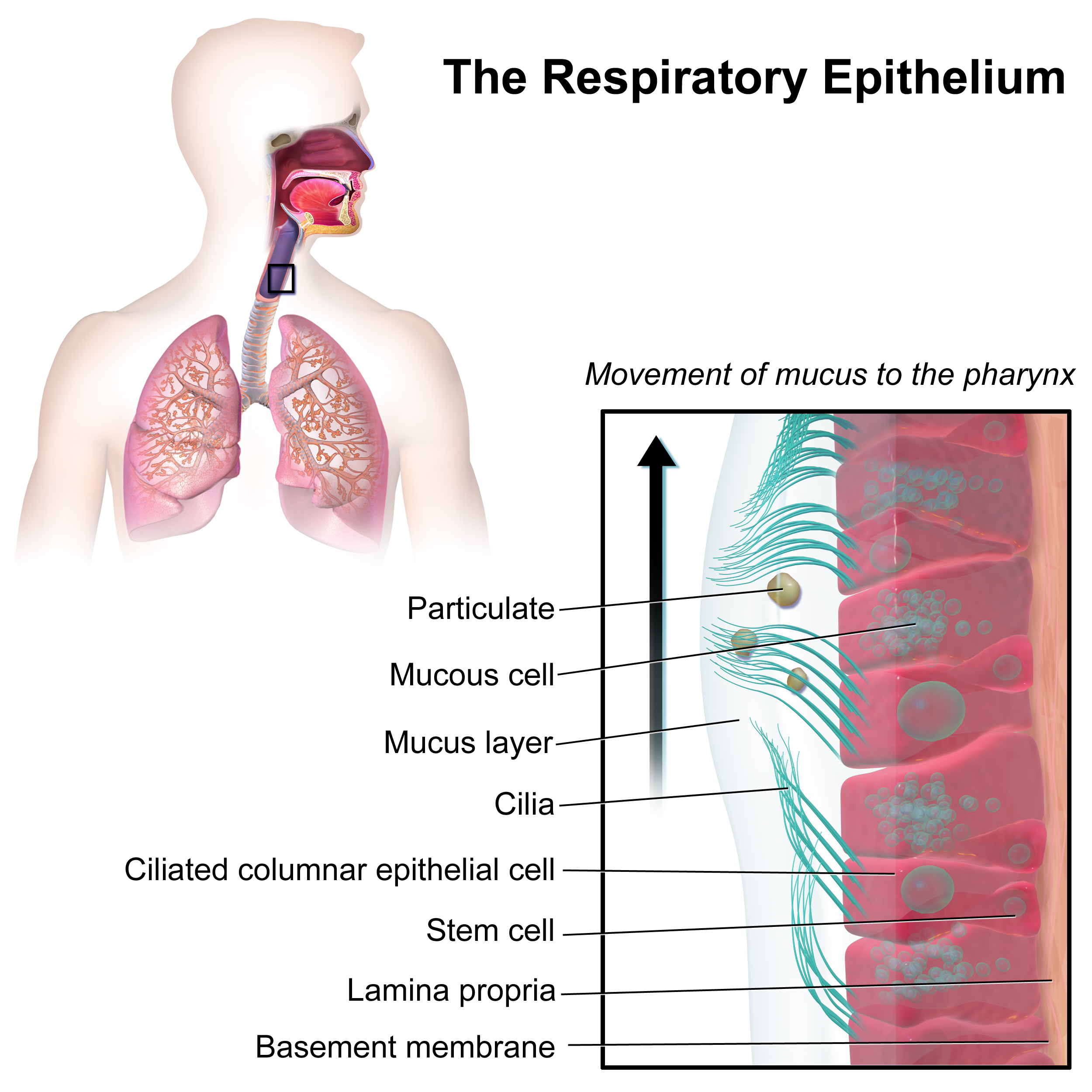
- Illustration depicting the respiratory epithelium. Basal cells labelled as stem cells.

Details
- System: Respiratory system

Identifiers
- MeSH: D020545
- TH: H3.05.00.0.00003

Respiratory epithelium, or airway epithelium, is ciliated pseudostratified columnar epithelium a type of columnar epithelium found lining most of the respiratory tract as respiratory mucosa, where it serves to moisten and protect the airways. It is not present in the vocal cords of the larynx, or the oropharynx and laryngopharynx, where instead the epithelium is stratified squamous. It also functions as a barrier to potential pathogens and foreign particles, preventing infection and tissue injury by the secretion of mucus and the action of mucociliary clearance.

== Structure ==
Pseudostratified columnar epithelium, animated image highlights the epithelial cells, goblet cells, then underlying connective tissue

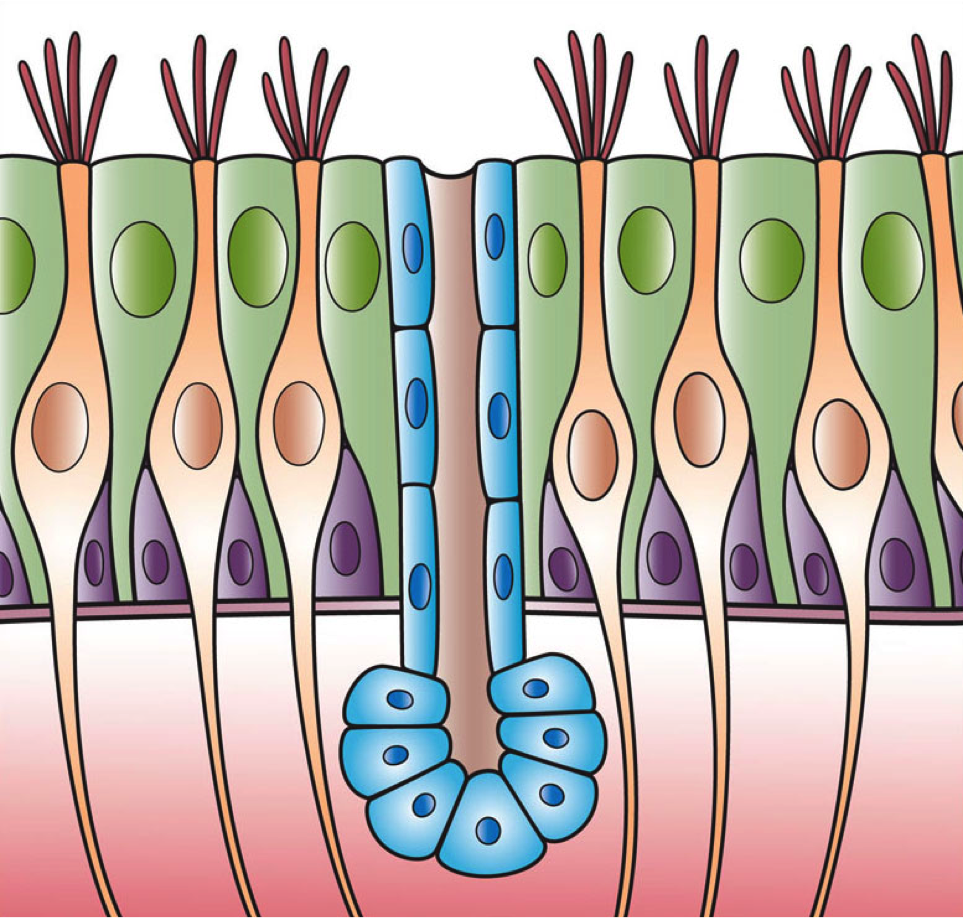
Cells of the respiratory epithelium. Basal cells shown in purple, ciliated cells shown in brown, goblet cells shown in green, and submucosal gland shown in blue.

The respiratory epithelium lining the upper respiratory airways is classified as ciliated pseudostratified columnar epithelium. This designation is due to the arrangement of the multiple cell types composing the respiratory epithelium. While all cells make contact with the basement membrane and are, therefore, a single layer of cells, their nuclei are not aligned in the same plane. Hence, it appears as though several layers of cells are present and the epithelium is called pseudostratified (falsely layered). The respiratory mucosa transitions to simple ciliated cuboidal epithelium and finally to simple squamous epithelium in the alveolar ducts and alveoli.

=== Cells ===
The cells in the respiratory epithelium are of five main types: a) ciliated cells, b) goblet cells, c) brush cells, d) airway basal cells, and e) small granule cells. Goblet cells become increasingly fewer further down the respiratory tree until they are absent in the terminal bronchioles; club cells take over their role to some extent here. Another important cell type is the pulmonary neuroendocrine cell. These are innervated cells that only make up around 0.5% of the respiratory epithelial cells. The ciliated cells are columnar epithelial cells with specialized ciliary modifications. The ciliated cells make up between 50 and 80 per cent of the epithelium.

Between the ciliated cells are numerous microvilli, attached as tufts to brush cells sometimes referred to as pulmonary brush cells; these are also known as the tuft cells of the gastrointestinal tract, or intestinal tuft cells, although there is a difference between the two types: the brush cells lack the terminal web that lies under the microvilli of the tuft cells. Although their function is not yet fully understood, it has been suggested that they exhibit a virulence associated clearance role, activating mucociliary clearance by releasing acetylcholine.

== Function ==
The respiratory epithelium functions to moisten and protect the airways. It acts as a physical barrier to pathogens, as well as their removal in the mechanism of mucociliary clearance.

The ciliated cells are the primary components in the mucociliary clearance mechanism. Each epithelial cell has around 200 cilia that beat constantly at a rate of between 10 and 20 times per second. The direction of their beat is targeted towards the pharynx, either upwards from the lower respiratory tract or downwards from the nasal structures.

Goblet cells, so named because they are shaped like a wine goblet, are columnar epithelial cells that contain membrane-bound mucous granules and secrete mucus as part of the airway surface liquid (ASL), also known as the epithelial lining fluid, the composition of which is tightly regulated; the mucus helps maintain epithelial moisture and traps particulate material and pathogens moving through the airway. and determines how well mucociliary clearance works.

The basal cells are small, nearly cuboidal that differentiate into the other cell types found within the epithelium. Basal cells respond to injury of the airway epithelium, migrating to cover a site denuded of differentiated epithelial cells, and subsequently differentiating to restore a healthy epithelial cell layer. The differentiated epithelial cells can also dedifferentiate into stem cells and contribute to the repairing of the barrier.

Club cells carry out similar functions in the more distal airways.

Certain parts of the respiratory tract, such as the oropharynx, are also subject to the abrasive swallowing of food. To prevent the destruction of the epithelium in these areas, it changes to stratified squamous epithelium, which is better suited to the constant sloughing and abrasion. The squamous layer of the oropharynx is continuous with the esophagus.

The respiratory epithelium has a further role of immunity for the lungs - that of glucose homeostasis. The glucose concentration in the airway surface liquid is held at a level of around 12 times lower than that of the blood sugar concentration. The tight junctions act as a barrier that restricts the passage of glucose across the epithelium into the airway lumen. Some glucose passes through, where it diffuses into the airway surface liquid to be kept at its reduced level by pulmonary glucose transport, and metabolism. However, airway inflammation decreases the effectiveness of the tight junctions making the barrier more permeable to glucose. Higher levels of glucose promote the proliferation of bacteria by providing glucose as a source for carbon for them. Increased levels of glucose in the airway surface liquid is associated with respiratory diseases, and hyperglycemia.

== Clinical significance ==
Long-term irritation of the epithelial cells can cause the overproduction of mucus, known as mucus hypersecretion. Mucus hypersecretion results in the productive cough of chronic bronchitis.

Pulmonary neuroendocrine cells have been associated with a range of chronic lung disorders. They are also the originating cells of small-cell lung cancer.

== Additional images ==
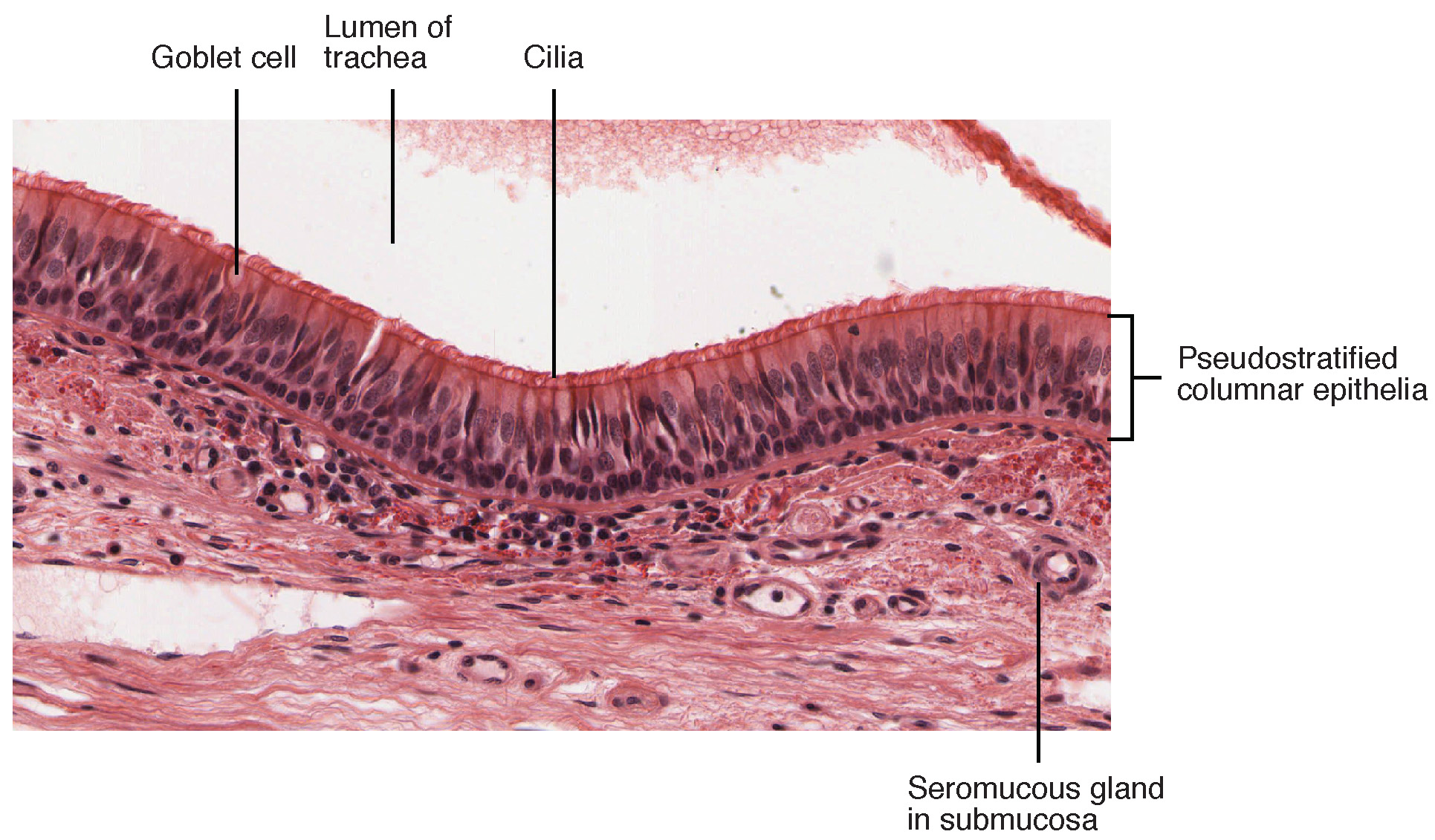
Cross-section of pseudostratified columnar epithelium

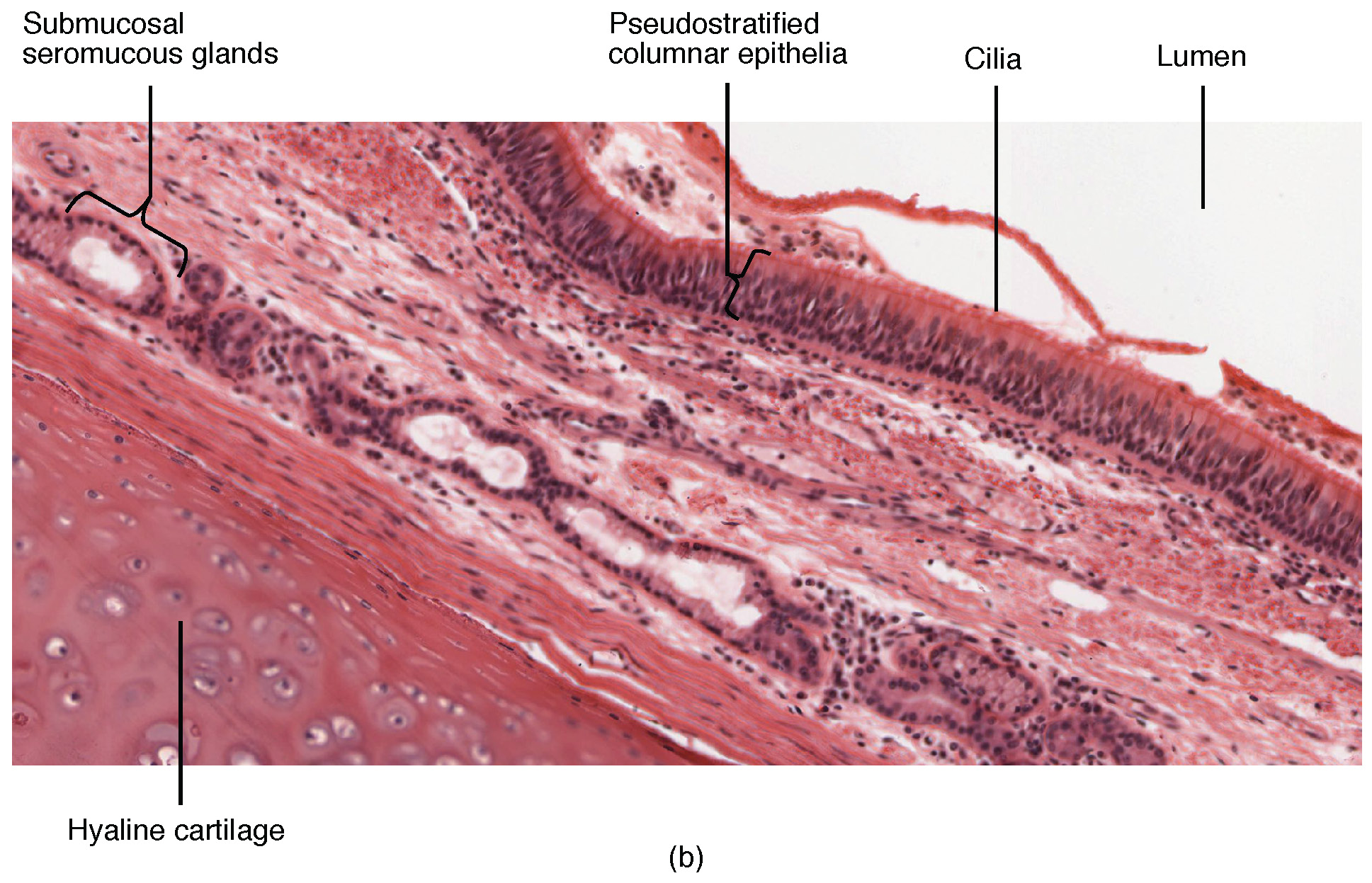
Second cross-section
