= Clivus (anatomy) =

Bony part of the skull base

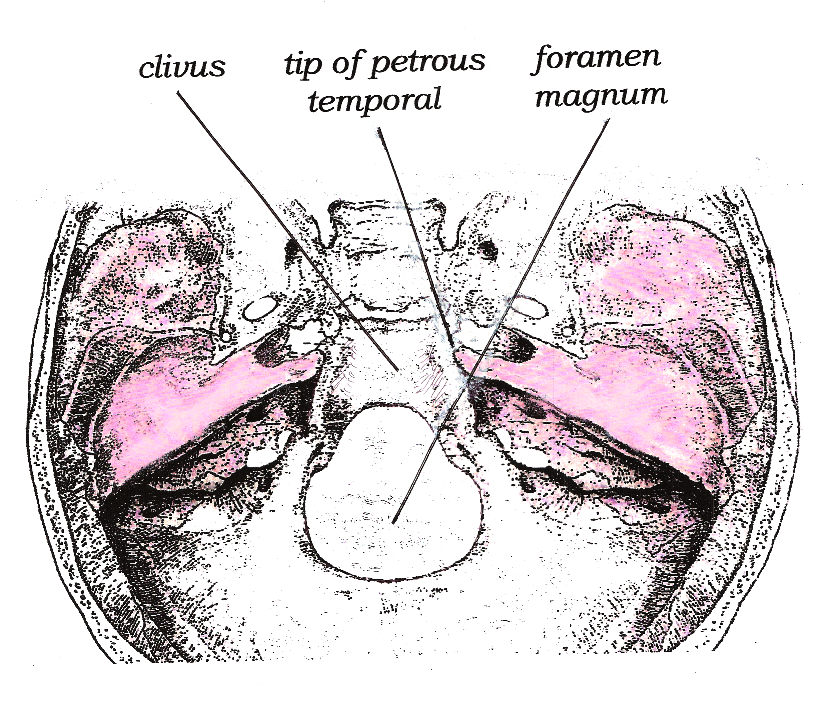
- Superior view of the clivus

Details

Identifiers
- Latin: clivus
- TA98: A02.1.00.051; A02.1.04.006
- TA2: 454
- FMA: 54376

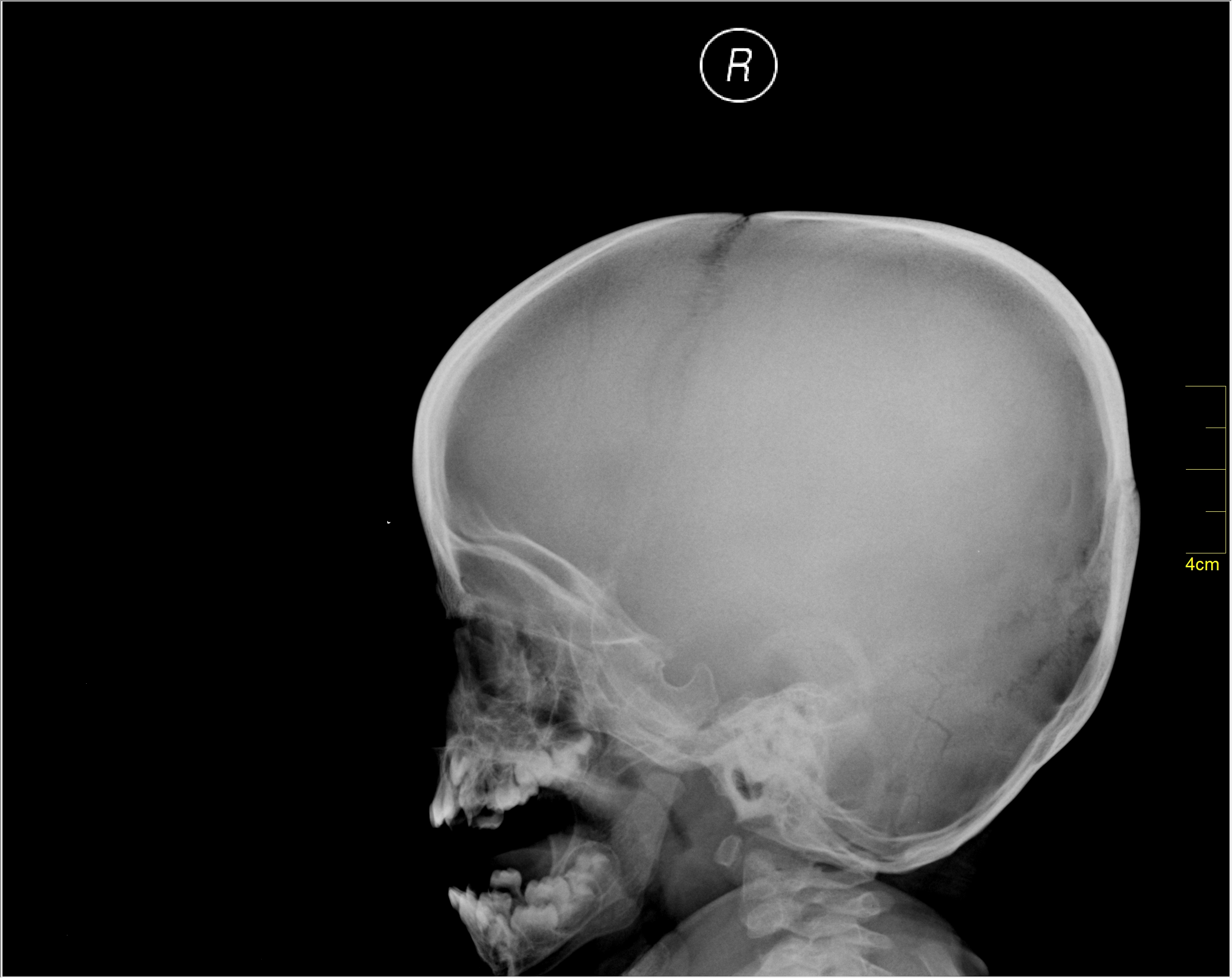
Lateral X-ray of a child's skull, showing the yet-radiolucent spheno-occipital joint (synchondrosis)

The clivus (/ˈklaɪvəs/, Latin for "slope") or Blumenbach's clivus is a part of the occipital bone at the base of the skull, extending anteriorly from the foramen magnum. It is related to the pons and the abducens nerve (CN VI).

The term is also used for the clivus ocularis, an unrelated feature of the retina.

== Structure ==
The clivus is a shallow depression behind the dorsum sellae of the sphenoid bone, extending inferiorly to the foramen magnum. It slopes gradually to the anterior part of the basilar occipital bone at its junction with the sphenoid bone. Synchondrosis of these two bones forms the clivus. On axial planes, it sits just posterior to the sphenoid sinuses. It is medial to the foramen lacerum and proximal to the anastomosis of the internal carotid artery with the Circle of Willis. (The artery reaches the middle cranial fossa above the foramen lacerum). It is anterior to the basilar artery. On sagittal plane, it can be divided into two surfaces, the pharyngeal (inferior) surface and basilar (superior) surface. A small elevation known as the pharyngeal tubercle is present on the inferior surface for the fibrous pharyngeal raphe to attach.

The pons sits on the basilar surface of the clivus. The abducens nerve (CN VI) also tracks along the clivus during its course.

=== Variations ===
During embryonic development, the clivus is formed by the sphenooccipital synchondrosis: fusion of the basiocciput and basisphenoid. When the fusion occurs improperly, it can give rise to gaps that are considered anatomical variations. Variations of the clivus include fossa navicularis magna, craniopharyngeal canal, canalis basilaris medianus, and transverse basilar fissure (Saucer's fissure). Ossification of the apical ligament of dens may also occur, resulting in a variant bony tubercle at the inferior end of the clivus. Two further variations, of possibly other etiology, are found at the lower end of the clivus: condylus tertius and arcus praebasiocipitalis. Ecchordosis physaliphora, a congenital benign lesion derived from the notochord, can occur in the dorsal part of the clivus.

In 2023, variant tubercles and eminences have been found on the basilar surface of the clivus in around 10% of the general population. The terms "basilar tubercles / eminences of the clivus" have been coined to described these newly discovered structures.

== Clinical importance ==
The abducens nerve (CN VI) tracks along the clivus during its course. Increased intracranial pressure can trap the nerve at this point and cause signs of palsy.

The clivus is also the site for chordoma, a rare type of cancer.

=== Surgery ===
Surgery for lesions involving the clivus and surrounding structures have traditionally been approached via extended subfrontal transbasal, anterior transfacial, lateral transtemporal, far-lateral approaches, and staged approaches. These approaches are limited in that they often require extensive bone removal and brain retraction while placing critical neurovascular structures between the surgeon and the site of pathology. It has been proposed that these limitations are mitigated by significant advancements in the use of endoscopic endonasal surgery. Contemporary surgical approaches involving extended endoscopic endonasal approaches to the clivus have been increasingly described by several groups, and have been shown to be a safe and effective strategy for the surgical management of a variety of benign and malignant lesions.

=== Relation of the clivus and dens ===
The clivus is an important landmark for checking for anatomical atlanto-occipital alignment. When viewed on a lateral C-spine radiograph, the clivus forms a line which, if extended, is known as Wackenheim's clivus line. Wackenheim's clivus line should pass through the dens of the axis or be tangential to it.

== History ==
"Clivus" is also used as an abbreviated term for the clivus ocularis, which is the sloping inner wall of the retina as it dips into the foveola in the macula of the eye. To disambiguate, the clivus is sometimes referred to as the Blumenbach clivus. This is named after Johann Friedrich Blumenbach.

== Additional images ==
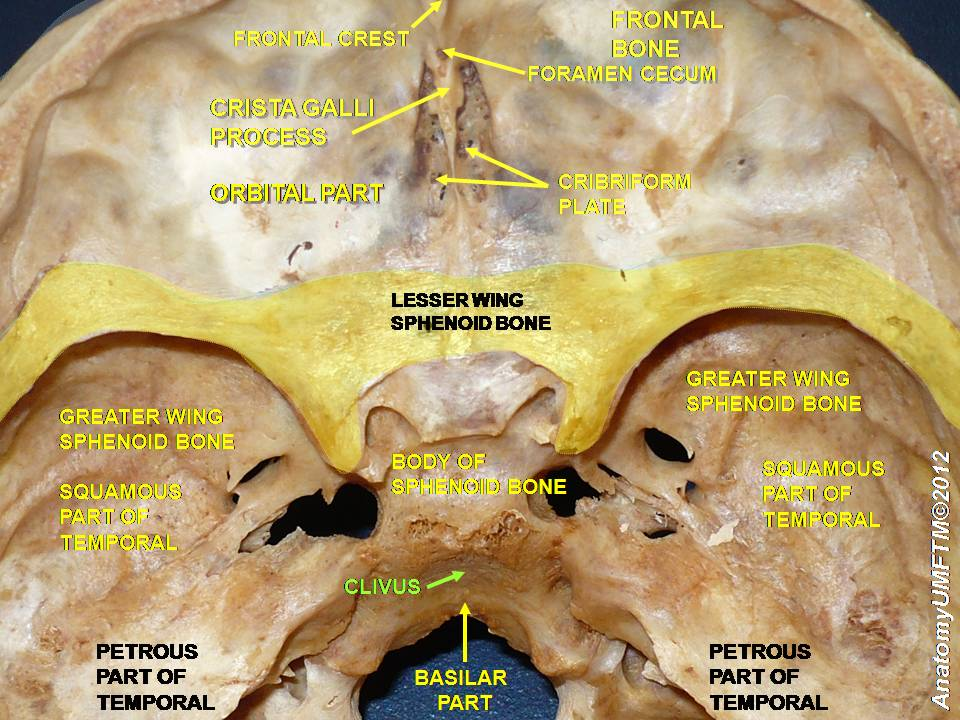
Clivus

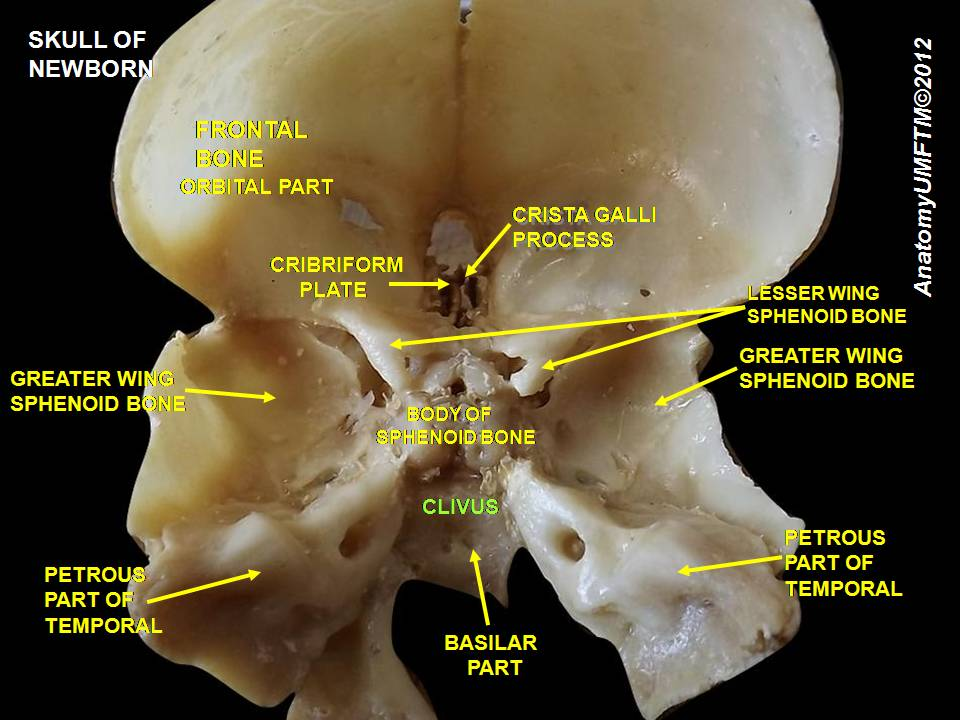
Clivus

== See also ==
- Pharyngeal tubercle
