= Sinus of Morgagni =

Sinus of Morgagni may refer to:

- Aortic sinus
- Sinus of Morgagni (pharynx)
