= Rectus capitis anterior muscle =

Muscle of the neck

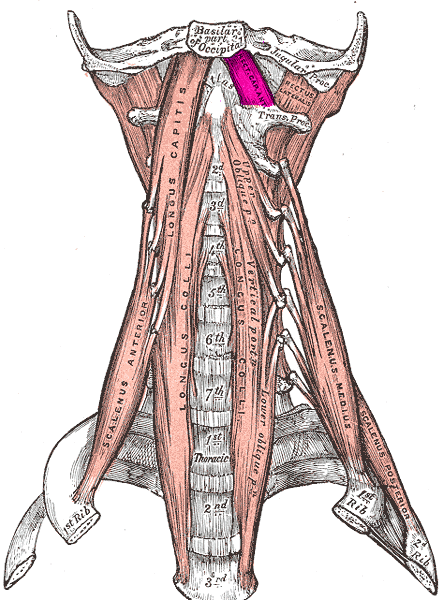
- The anterior vertebral muscles. Rectus capitis anterior muscle labeled in purple

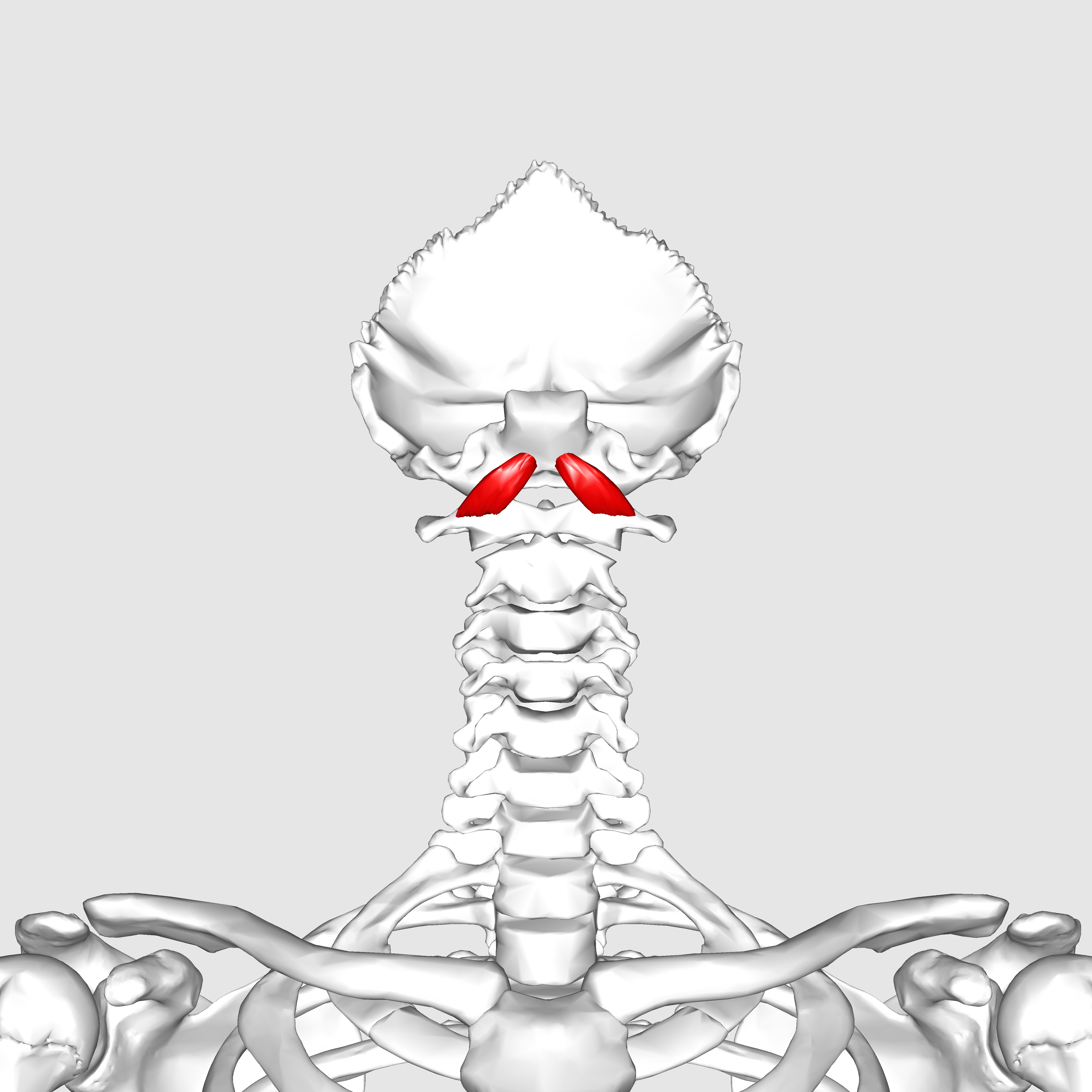
- Anterior view of rectus capitis anterior muscle. Skull has been removed (except for occipital bone)

Details
- Origin: Atlas (C1)
- Insertion: Basilar part of the occipital bone
- Artery: Ascending artery
- Nerve: Ventral primary rami of spinal nerves C1-2
- Actions: Flexion of neck at atlanto-occipital joint

Identifiers
- Latin: musculus rectus capitis anterior
- TA98: A04.2.02.002
- TA2: 2150
- FMA: 46312

The rectus capitis anterior (rectus capitis anticus minor) is a short, flat muscle, situated immediately behind the upper part of the Longus capitis.

It arises from the anterior surface of the lateral mass of the atlas, and from the root of its transverse process, and passing obliquely upward and medialward, is inserted into the inferior surface of the basilar part of the occipital bone immediately in front of the foramen magnum.

action: aids in flexion of the head and the neck; nerve supply: C1, C2.

== Additional images ==
Animation. Position of rectus capitis anterior muscle. Some bones around the muscle are shown in semi-transparent.

Skull has been removed (except for occipital bone)

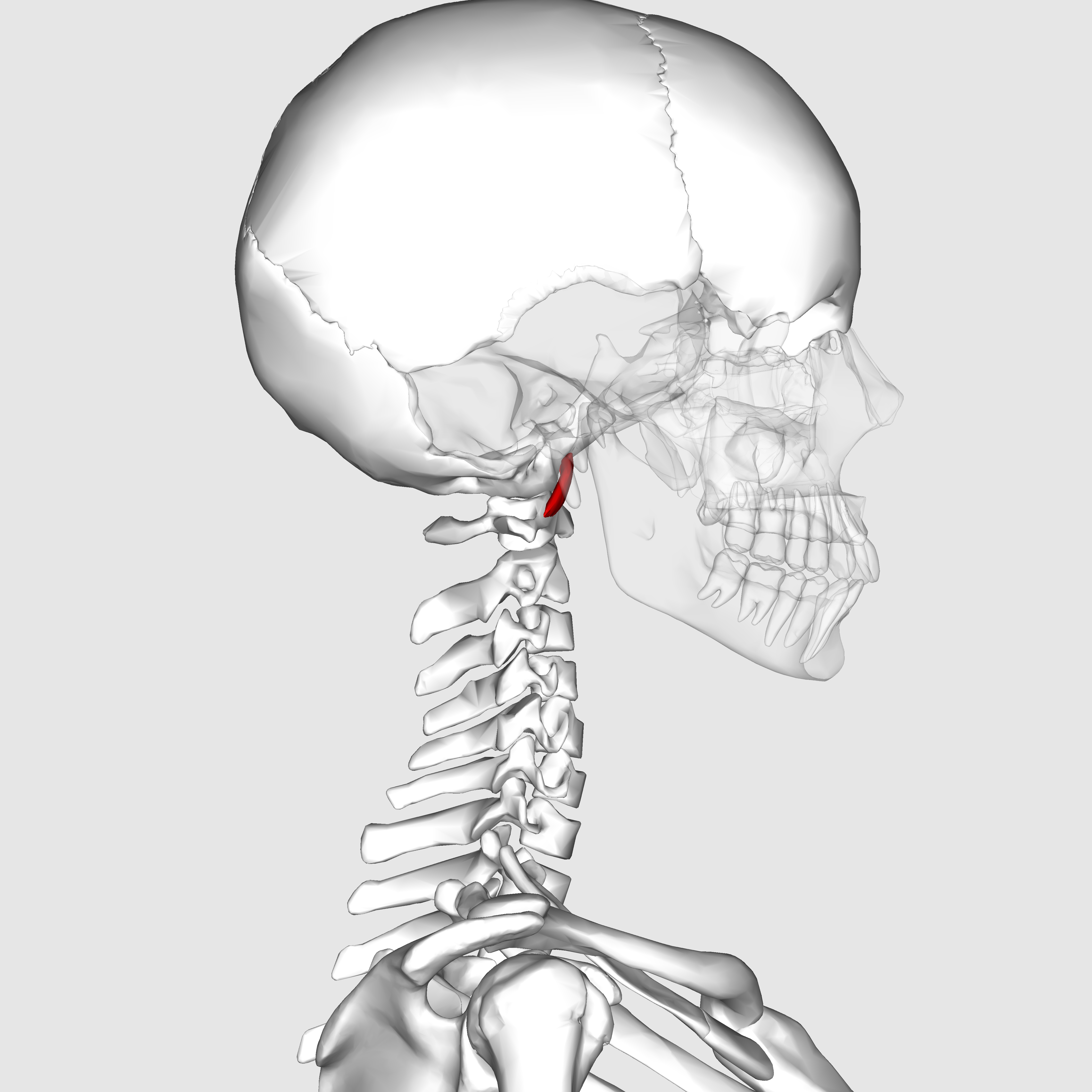
Lateral view. Still image.

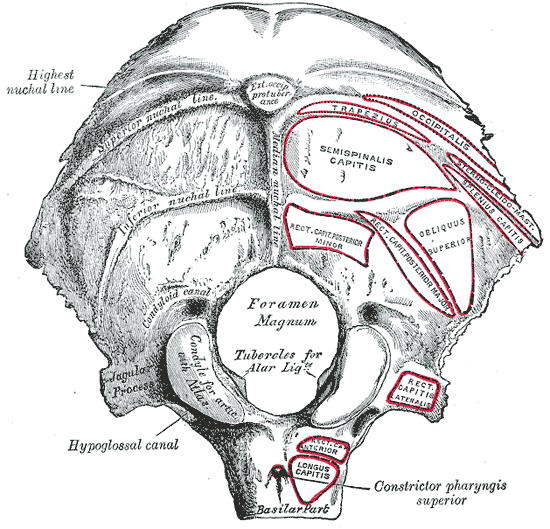
Occipital bone. Outer surface.

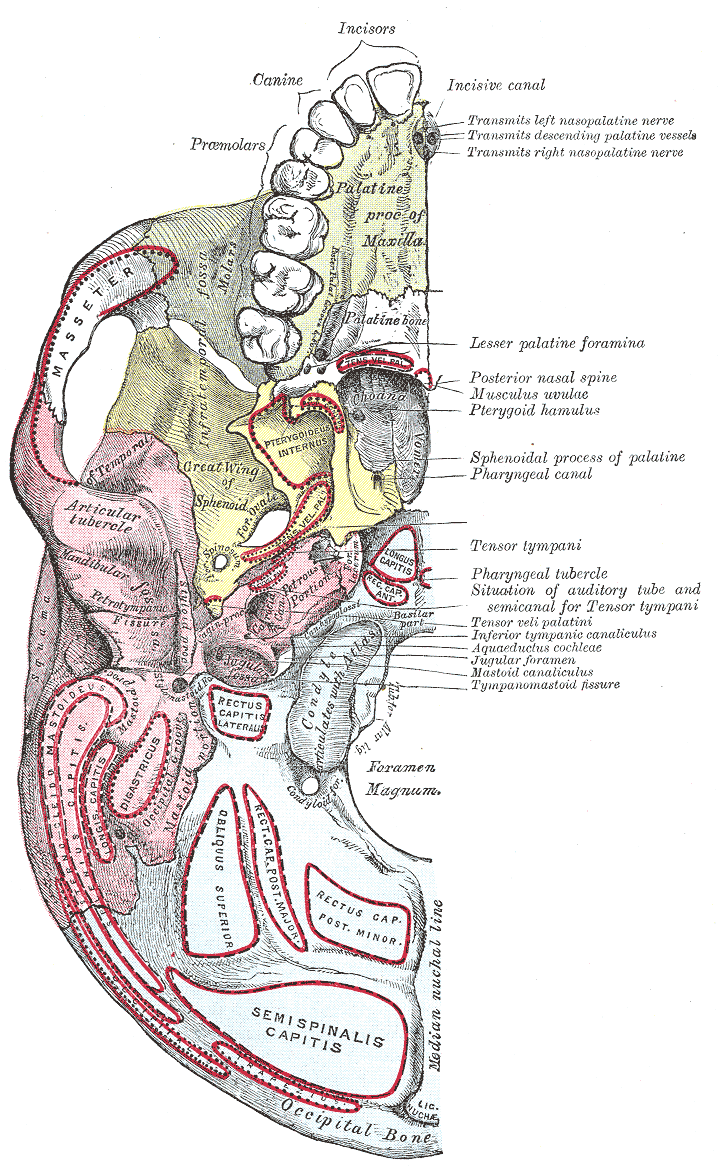
Base of skull. Inferior surface.
