= Fossa navicularis magna =

Human anatomical feature

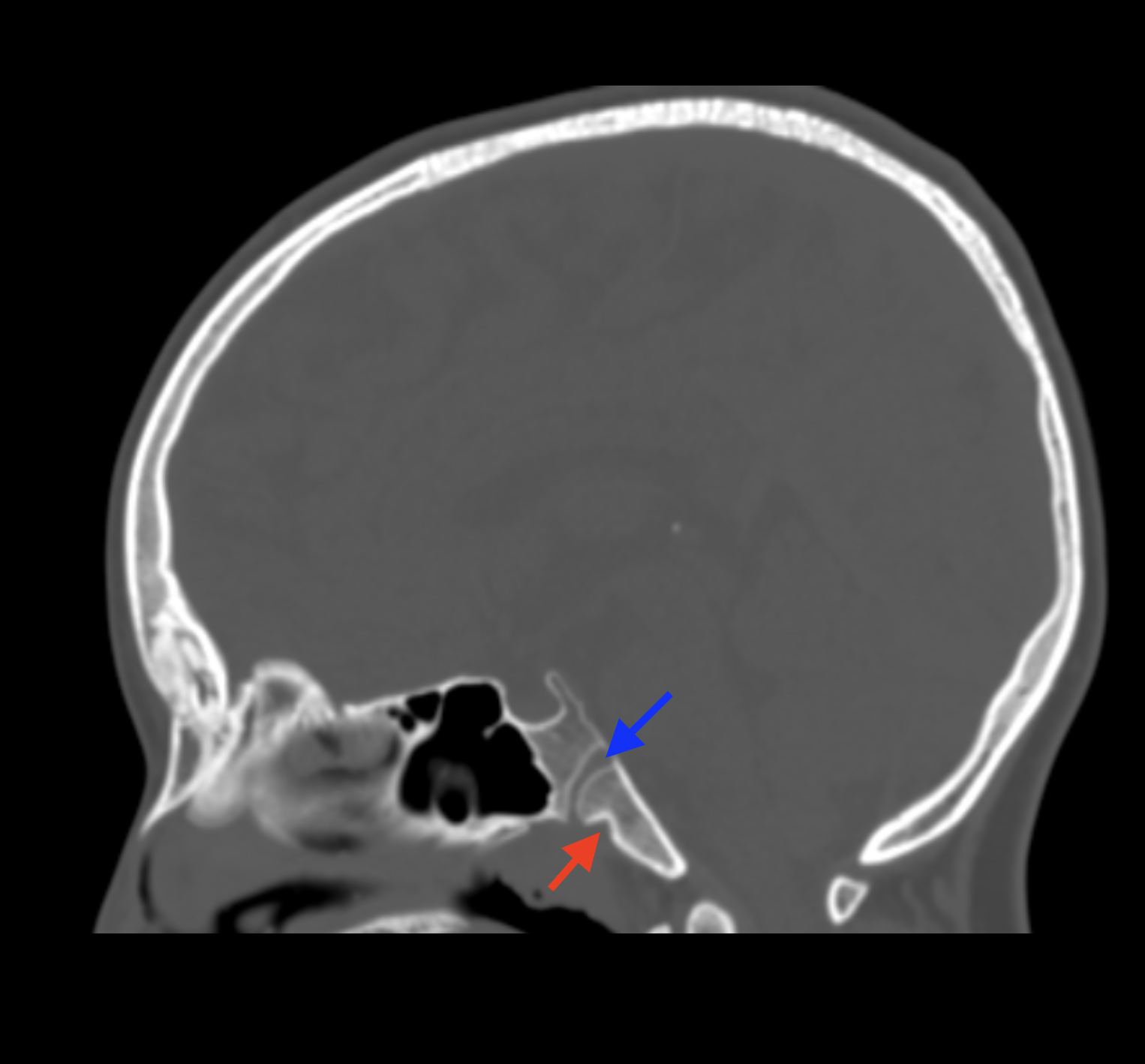
Fosas navicularis magna (red arrow) on mid-sagittal computed tomography

Fossa navicularis magna (also known as pharyngeal fossa or phyaryngeal fovela) is a variant bony depression found at the midline of the occipital part of clivus. This fossa was first described by Tourtual. Its prevalence ranges from 0.9 to 5.3%.

== Structure ==
Fossa navicularis magna is located on the anterior surface or pharyngeal surface of the clivus. Its position when present is between the spheno-occipital synchondrosis and the foramen magnum. Size of this fossa varies considerably and its depth ranges from 3.49 to 4.94 mm. A histological study reported the presence of loose connective tissue containing collagen and elastic fibers within the fossa navicularis magna.

=== Development ===
Two theories have been proposed to explain the formation of fossa navicularis magna. It is believed that the fossa is formed as a remnant of the notochord or residue of the channels for emissary veins.

== Clinical significance ==
Different pathologies were found associated with fossa navicularis magna including cancers, adenoid hypertrophy, ecchordosis physaliphora, Tornwaldt cyst and Rathke cleft cyst.

== See also ==
- Craniopharyngeal canal
- Clivus
