= Sinus of Morgagni (pharynx) =

Anatomical space of the pharynx

In the pharynx, the sinus of Morgagni is the enclosed space between the upper border of the superior pharyngeal constrictor muscle, the base of the skull and the pharyngeal aponeurosis.

== Contents ==
Structures passing through this sinus are:

1. Cartilaginous part of auditory tube
2. Levator veli palatini muscle
3. Ascending palatine artery
4. Palatine branch of Ascending pharyngeal artery
5. Tensor veli palatini muscle

== Clinical significance ==
In nasopharyngeal carcinoma, the tumor may extend laterally and involve this sinus involving the mandibular nerve. This produces a triad of symptoms known as Trotter's Triad. These symptoms are:

1. Conductive deafness (due to Eustachian tube obstruction)
2. Ipsilateral immobility of the soft palate
3. Trigeminal neuralgia
