= Tympanic artery =

Tympanic artery can refer to:

- Anterior tympanic artery (arteria tympanica anterior)
- Inferior tympanic artery (arteria tympanica inferior)
- Superior tympanic artery (arteria tympanica superior)
- Posterior tympanic artery (arteria tympanica posterior)
