= Inferior tympanic artery =

Small branch of the ascending pharyngeal artery

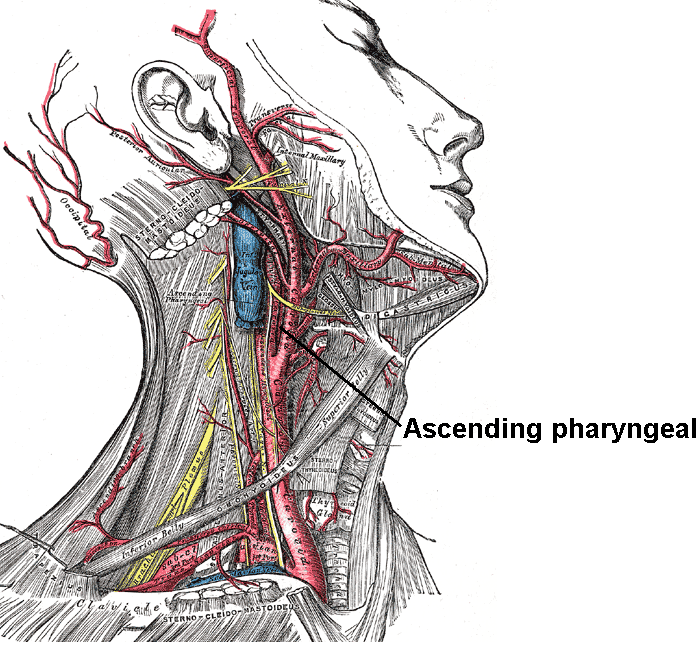
- Superficial dissection of the right side of the neck, showing the carotid and subclavian arteries

Details
- Precursor: aortic arch 2
- Source: Ascending pharyngeal artery

Identifiers
- Latin: arteria tympanica inferior
- TA98: A12.2.05.013
- TA2: 4381
- FMA: 49506

The inferior tympanic artery is a small branch of the ascending pharyngeal artery which passes through the tympanic canaliculus alongside the tympanic branch of glossopharyngeal nerve (CN IX) to reach and provide arterial supply to the medial wall of the tympanic cavity where it forms anastomoses with the other tympanic arteries.

== Clinical significance ==
In the case of a missing or underdeveloped cervical ICA, the Inferior tympanic artery can provide collateral ICA circulation by reversing flow of the caroticotympanic artery (embryologic hyoid artery). This can result in pulsatile tinnitus. The resulting aberrant carotid artery can mimic neoplasm on CT.
