= Pharyngeal tubercle =

Part of the occipital bone of the skull

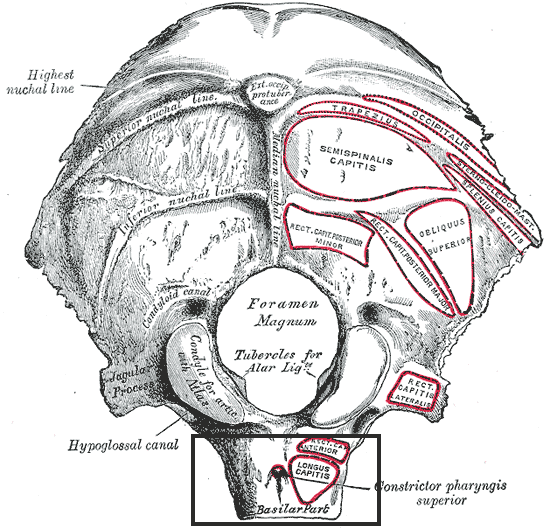
- Occipital bone. Outer surface. (Pharyngeal tubercle not labeled but visible at bottom, at center of box, labeled as attachment point of constrictor pharyngis superior.)

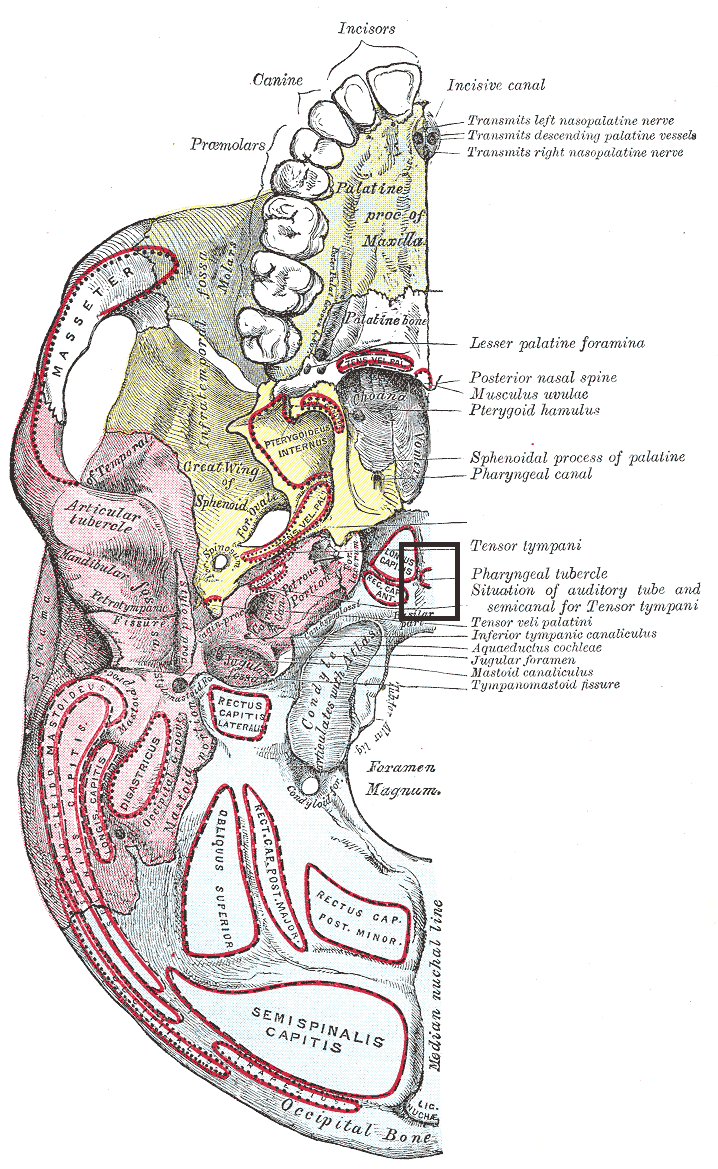
- Base of skull. Inferior surface. (Pharyngeal tubercle labeled at right, eighth from the bottom.)

Details
- Part of: Occipital bone
- System: Skeletal

Identifiers
- Latin: tuberculum pharyngeum
- TA98: A02.1.04.007
- TA2: 555
- FMA: 75746

The pharyngeal tubercle is a part of the occipital bone of the head and neck. It is located on the lower surface of the basilar part of occipital bone. It is the site of attachment of the pharyngeal raphe.

== Structure ==
The pharyngeal tubercle is located on the inferior surface of the basilar part of occipital bone. This about 1 cm anterior to the foramen magnum.

=== Attachments ===
The pharyngeal tubercle gives attachment to the pharyngeal raphe and, thereby, the superior pharyngeal constrictor muscle which forms it.

== See also ==
- Clivus (anatomy)
