= Inferior pharyngeal constrictor muscle =

Skeletal muscle of the pharynx

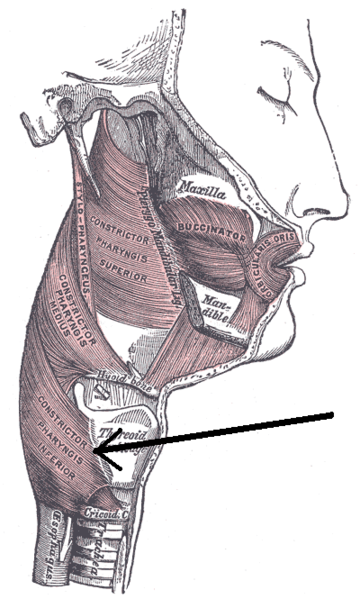
- Muscles of the pharynx and cheek. (Constrictor pharyngis inferior visible at bottom left.)

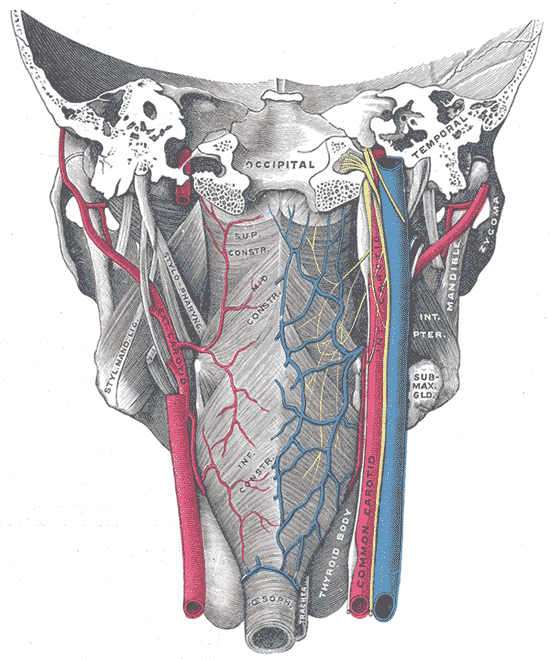
- Muscles of the pharynx, viewed from behind, together with the associated vessels and nerves. (Inf. const. labeled at bottom center.)

Details
- Origin: Cricoid cartilage and thyroid cartilage
- Insertion: Pharyngeal raphe
- Nerve: Pharyngeal plexus of vagus nerve, recurrent laryngeal nerve and superior laryngeal nerve
- Actions: Swallowing

Identifiers
- Latin: musculus constrictor pharyngis inferior
- TA98: A05.3.01.111
- TA2: 2187
- FMA: 46623

The inferior pharyngeal constrictor muscle is a skeletal muscle of the neck. It is the thickest of the three outer pharyngeal muscles. It arises from the sides of the cricoid cartilage and the thyroid cartilage. It is supplied by the vagus nerve (CN X). It is active during swallowing, and partially during breathing and speech. It may be affected by Zenker's diverticulum.

== Structure ==
The inferior pharyngeal constrictor muscle is composed of two parts. The first part (and more superior) arises from the thyroid cartilage (thyropharyngeal part), and the second part arises from the cricoid cartilage (cricopharyngeal part).

- On the thyroid cartilage, it arises from the oblique line on the side of the lamina, from the surface behind this nearly as far as the posterior border and from the inferior horn of the thyroid cartilage.
- From the cricoid cartilage, it arises in the interval between the cricothyroid muscle in front, and the articular facet for the inferior horn of the thyroid cartilage behind.

From these origins, the fibers spread backward and medially to insert with the muscle of the opposite side into the fibrous pharyngeal raphe in the posterior median line of the pharynx. The thyropharyngeal part mainly uses type 2 fibres (anaerobic), while the cricopharyngeal part mainly uses type 1 fibres (aerobic). Fibre type may change after birth.

The inferior fibers are horizontal and continuous with the circular fibers of the esophagus; the rest ascend, increasing in obliquity, and overlap the middle pharyngeal constrictor muscle. The cricopharyngeal part is synonymous with the upper esophageal sphincter (UES), which controls the opening of the cervical esophagus. It is sometimes referred to as the cricopharyngeal inlet.

=== Nerve supply ===
The inferior pharyngeal constrictor muscle can be supplied by branches from the pharyngeal plexus, the recurrent laryngeal nerve, the external branch of the superior laryngeal nerve, or a combination of these (the recurrent laryngeal nerve being the most common innervation of the cricopharyngeal part). All these branches and nerves come from the vagus nerve (CN X).

=== Variation ===
The inferior pharyngeal constrictor muscle can merge with superior pharyngeal constrictor, or posterior part of pharyngobasilar fascia.

== Function ==
The inferior pharyngeal constrictor muscle has a broad role in moving the lower part of the pharynx.

=== Swallowing ===
As soon as a bolus of food is received in the pharynx, elevator muscles relax, and the pharynx descends. The inferior pharyngeal constrictor muscle, along with the other constrictors, contract upon the bolus, and convey it downward into the esophagus. During swallowing, they contract and cause peristalsis in the pharynx.

=== Breathing ===
The inferior pharyngeal constrictor muscle is partially used during breathing and speech. It helps to keep the pharynx open, particularly during sleep.

== Clinical significance ==
=== Zenker's diverticulum ===
Uncoordinated muscle contraction, cricopharyngeal spasm, or impaired relaxation of the inferior pharyngeal constrictor muscle are currently considered the main factors in development of a Zenker's diverticulum. Zenker's diverticulum develops between the two muscular bellies (the thyropharyngeal part and the cricopharyngeal part) in a small gap called Killian's dehiscence. A diverticulum can form where a balloon of mucosa becomes trapped outside the pharyngeal boundaries. Food or other materials may reside here, which may lead to infection. Motor incoordination of the cricopharyngeal part can cause difficulty swallowing.

In extreme cases, this can be related to retrograde cricopharyngeal dysfunction (R-CPD) which causes the inability to burp; this is in part due to the muscle not being able to relax. Botox or a cricopharyngeal myotomy are used to treat the condition.

=== Radiological damage ===
The inferior pharyngeal constrictor muscle may be damaged by chemotherapy-intensity modulated radiotherapy. This may lead to dysphagia, causing continued use of a feeding tube rather than independent swallowing.

== Additional images ==
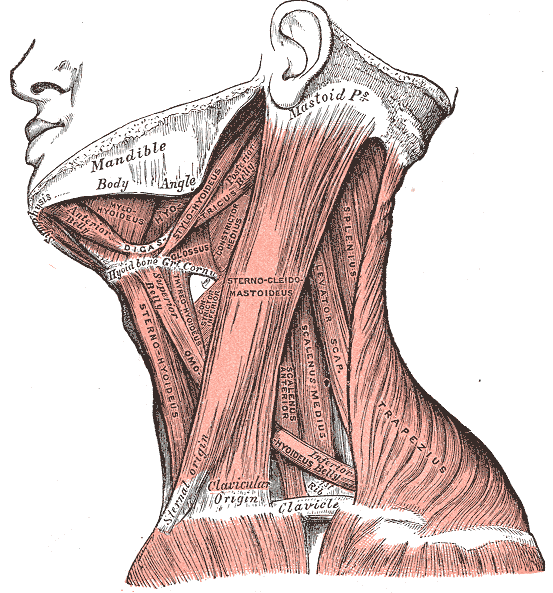
Muscles of the neck. Lateral view.

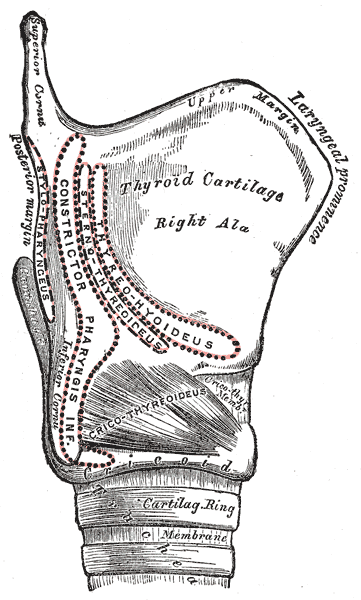
Side view of the larynx, showing muscular attachments.

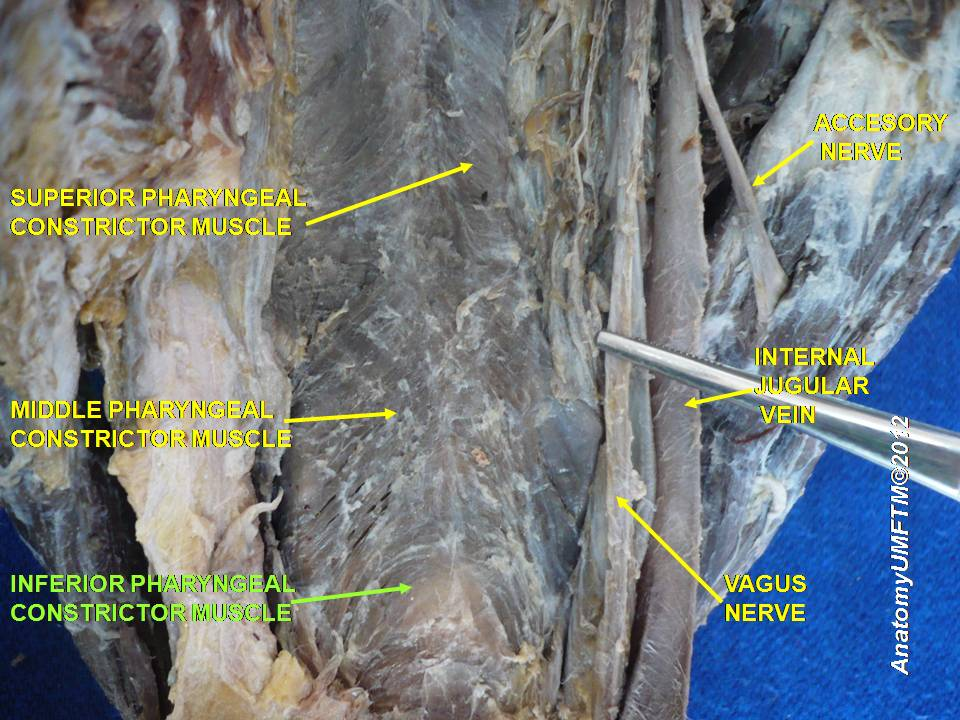
Inferior pharyngeal constrictor muscle

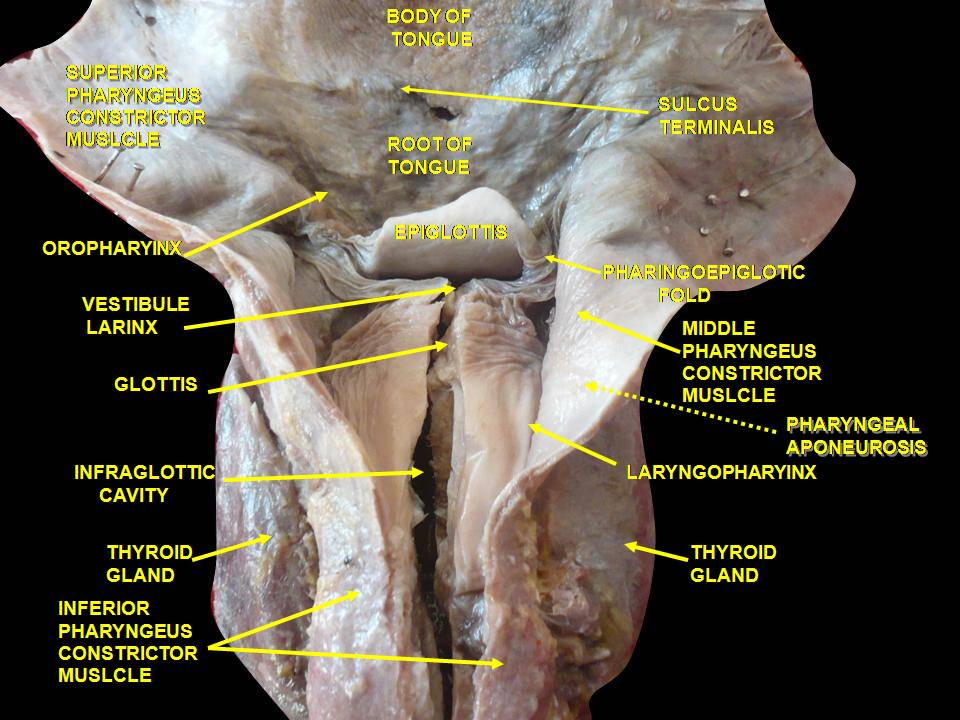
Deep dissection of larynx, pharynx and tongue seen from behind

== See also ==
- Upper esophageal sphincter
