= Superior pharyngeal constrictor muscle =

Muscle

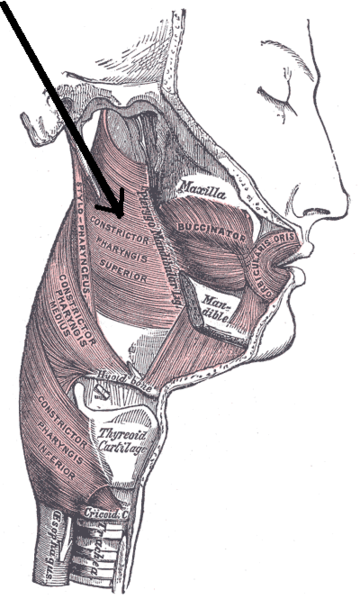
- Muscles of the pharynx and cheek.

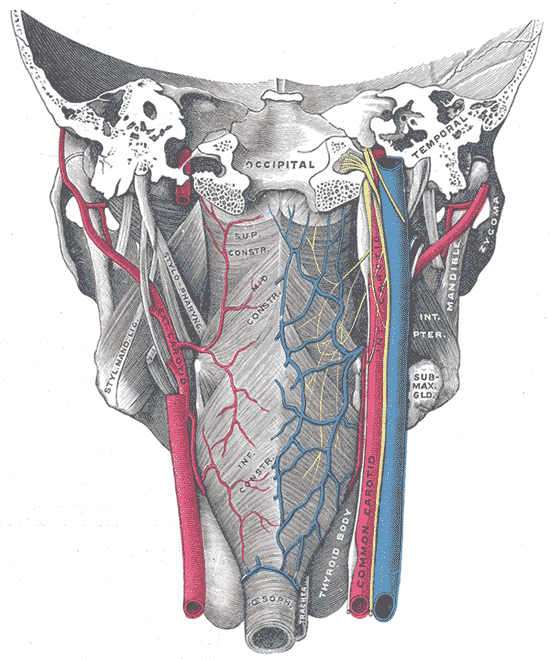
- Muscles of the pharynx, viewed from behind, together with the associated vessels and nerves.

Details
- Origin: Medial pterygoid plate, pterygomandibular raphé, alveolar process
- Insertion: Pharyngeal raphe, pharyngeal tubercle
- Artery: Ascending pharyngeal artery and tonsillar branch of facial artery
- Nerve: Pharyngeal plexus of vagus nerve
- Actions: Swallowing

Identifiers
- Latin: musculus constrictor pharyngis superior
- TA98: A05.3.01.103
- TA2: 2179
- FMA: 46621

The superior pharyngeal constrictor muscle is a quadrilateral muscle of the pharynx. It is the uppermost and thinnest of the three pharyngeal constrictors.

The muscle is divided into four parts according to its four distinct origins: a pterygopharyngeal, buccopharyngeal, mylopharyngeal, and a glossopharyngeal part. The muscle inserts onto the pharyngeal raphe, and pharyngeal spine. It is innervated by pharyngeal branch of the vagus nerve via the pharyngeal plexus. It acts to convey a bolus down towards the esophagus, facilitating swallowing.

== Anatomy ==
The superior constrictor muscle is a quadrilateral, sheet-like muscle. It is thinner than the middle and inferior constrictor muscles.

=== Origin ===
The sites of origin of the muscles collectively are the pterygoid hamulus (and occasionally the adjoining posterior margin of the medial pterygoid plate) anteriorly, (the posterior margin of) the pterygomandibular raphe, the posterior extremity of the mylohyoid line of mandible, and (negligibly) the side of the tongue.

Four parts of the muscle are distinguished according to the origin:

- Pterygopharyngeal part - originating from the lower third of the posterior margin of the medial pterygoid plate and its hamulus
- Buccopharyngeal part - originating from the pterygomandibular raphe
- Mylopharyngeal part - originating from the alveolar process of the mandible above the posterior end of the mylohyoid line
- Glossopharyngeal part - a few fibers originating from the side of the tongue

=== Insertion ===
The muscle's fibres extend posterior-ward from its origin to form the midline pharyngeal raphe which then attaches onto the pharyngeal tubercle (of the basilar part of the occipital bone).

=== Innervation ===
The superior pharyngeal constrictor muscle receives motor innervation from the pharyngeal plexus of vagus nerve.

=== Vasculature ===
Arterial supply is provided primarily by the pharyngeal branch of the ascending pharyngeal artery, and the tonsilar branch of the facial artery.

=== Relations ===
The interval between the upper border of the muscle and the base of the skull is closed by the pharyngeal aponeurosis, and is known as the sinus of Morgagni.

There is an interval between superior pharyngeal constrictor and middle pharyngeal constrictor, this space contains glossopharyngeal nerve, lingual nerve and the stylopharyngeus muscle.

The superior fibers arch beneath the levator veli palatini muscle and the Eustachian tube.

=== Actions/movements ===
Constriction of the muscle constricts the superior portion of the pharynx.

== Function ==
As soon as the bolus of food is received in the pharynx, the elevator muscles relax, the pharynx descends, and the constrictors contract upon the bolus, conveying it downward into the esophagus.

== Additional images ==
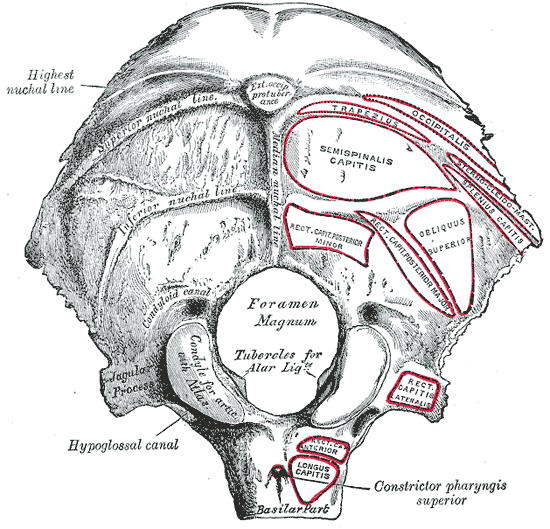
Occipital bone seen from outside

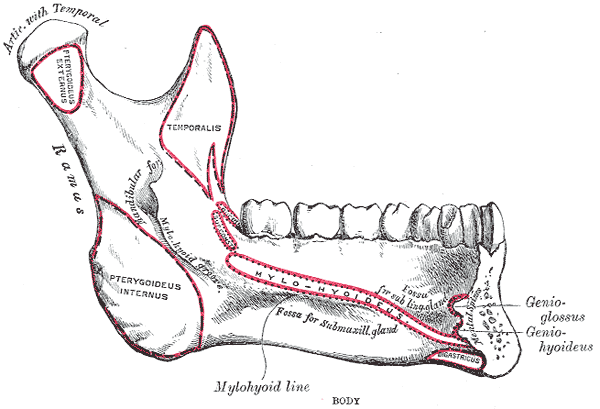
Inner surface of the Mandible seen from the side. The insertion of the mylopharyngeal part of the superior pharyngeal constrictor muscle is marked as "sup const".

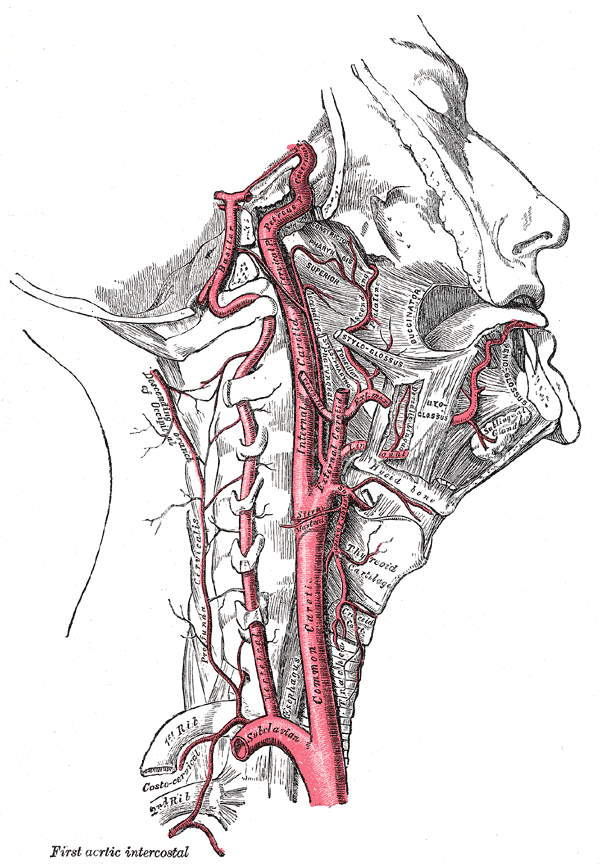
The internal carotid and vertebral arteries. Right side.

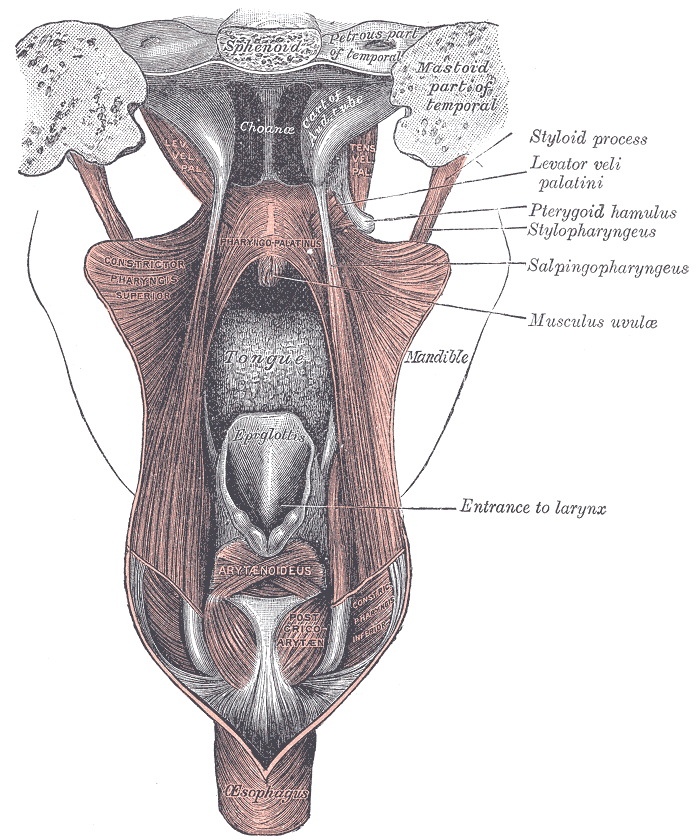
Muscles of the palate seen from behind.

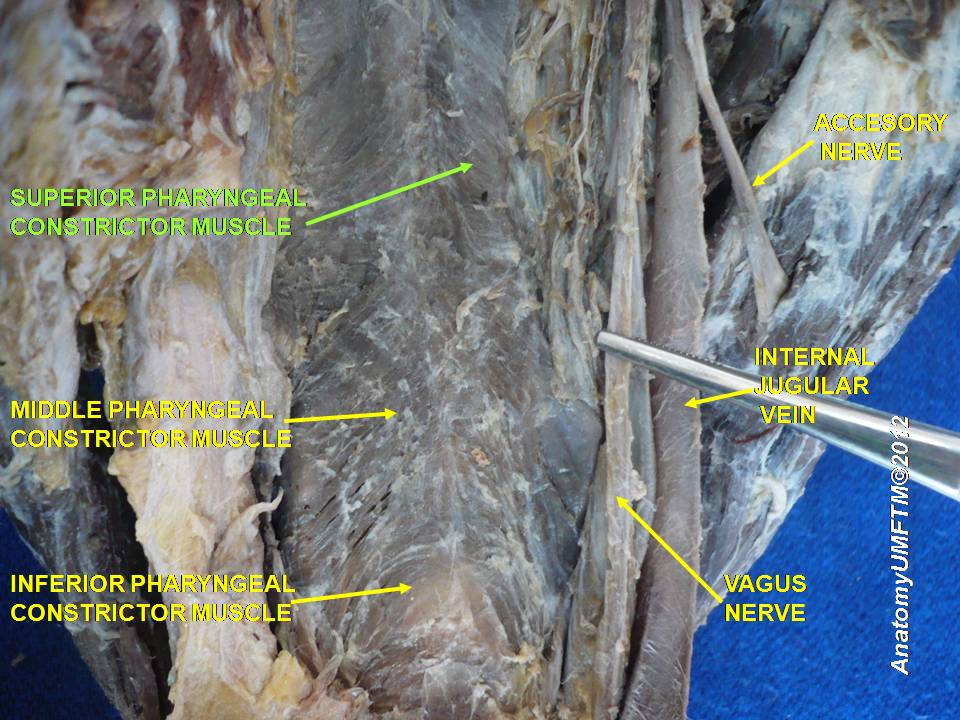
Dissection of the pharyngeal constrictors

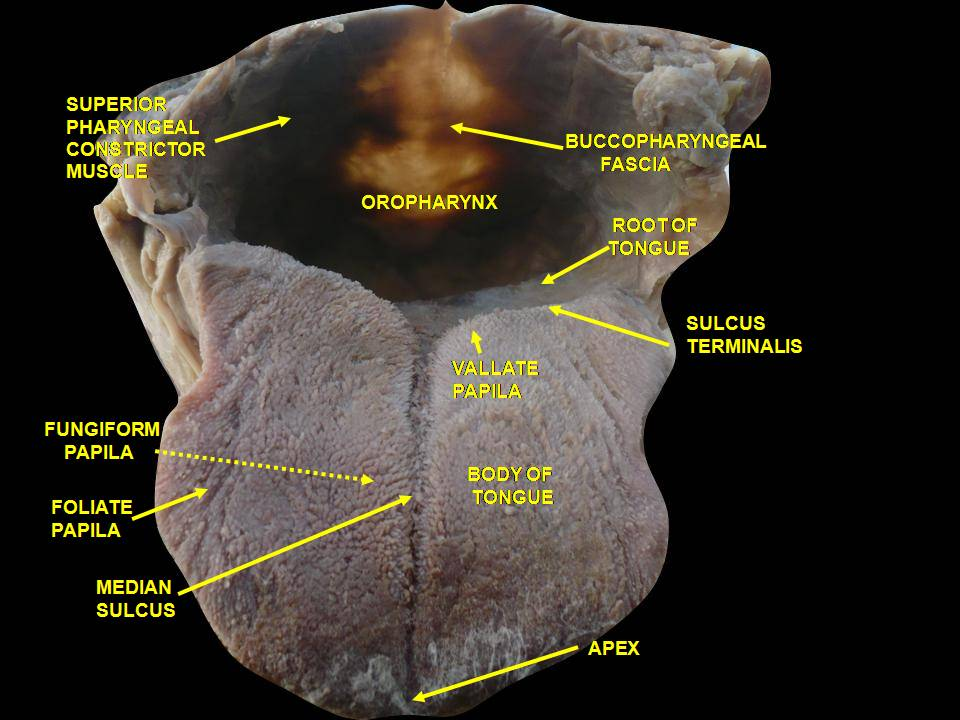
Deep dissection of the floor of mouth. Anterior view.

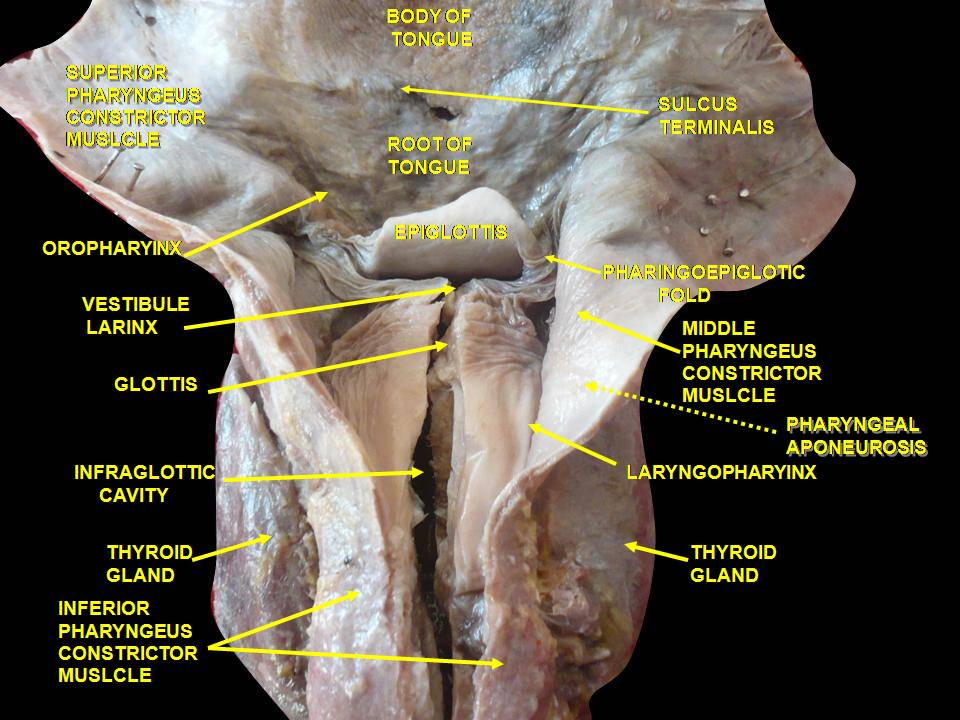
Deep dissection of larynx, pharynx and tongue seen from behind
