= Pharyngobasilar fascia =

Anatomical feature

Details

Identifiers
- Latin: fascia pharyngobasilaris
- TA98: A05.3.01.027
- TA2: 2858
- FMA: 55074

The pharyngobasilar fascia is a fascia of the pharynx. It is situated between the mucous and muscular layers of the pharynx. It is formed as a thickening of the pharyngeal mucosa superior to the superior pharyngeal constrictor muscle. It attaches to the basilar part of occipital bone, the petrous part of the temporal bone (medial to the pharyngotympanic tube), the (posterior border of the) medial pterygoid plate, and the pterygomandibular raphe. It diminishes in thickness inferiorly. Posteriorly, it is reinforced by the pharyngeal raphe. It reinforces the pharyngeal wall where muscle is deficient.

== Additional images ==
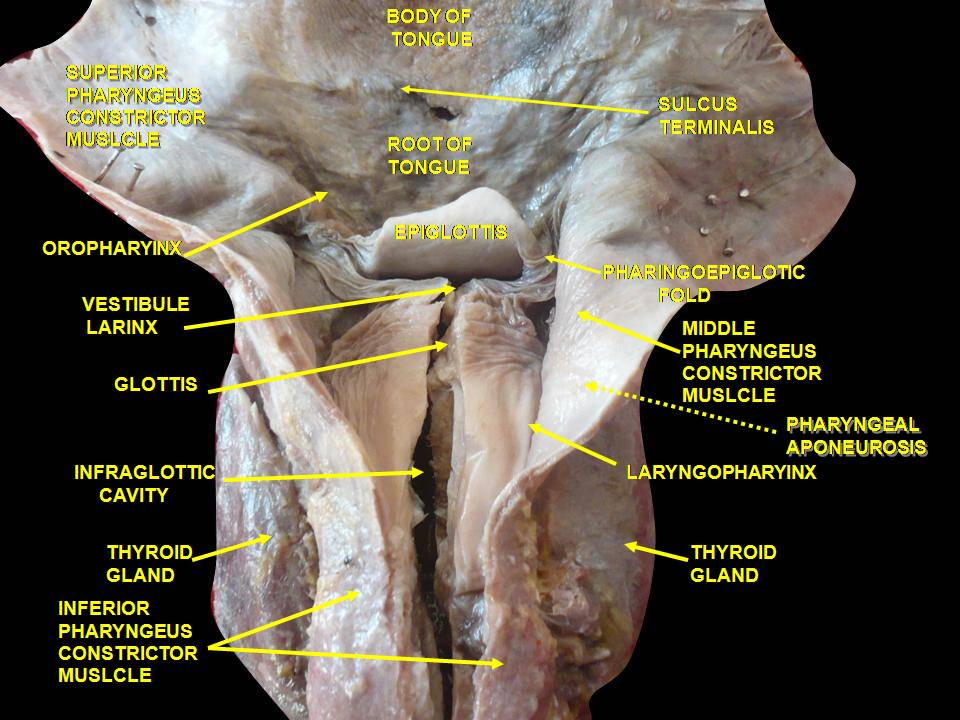
Larynx, pharynx and tongue. Deep dissection, posterior view.

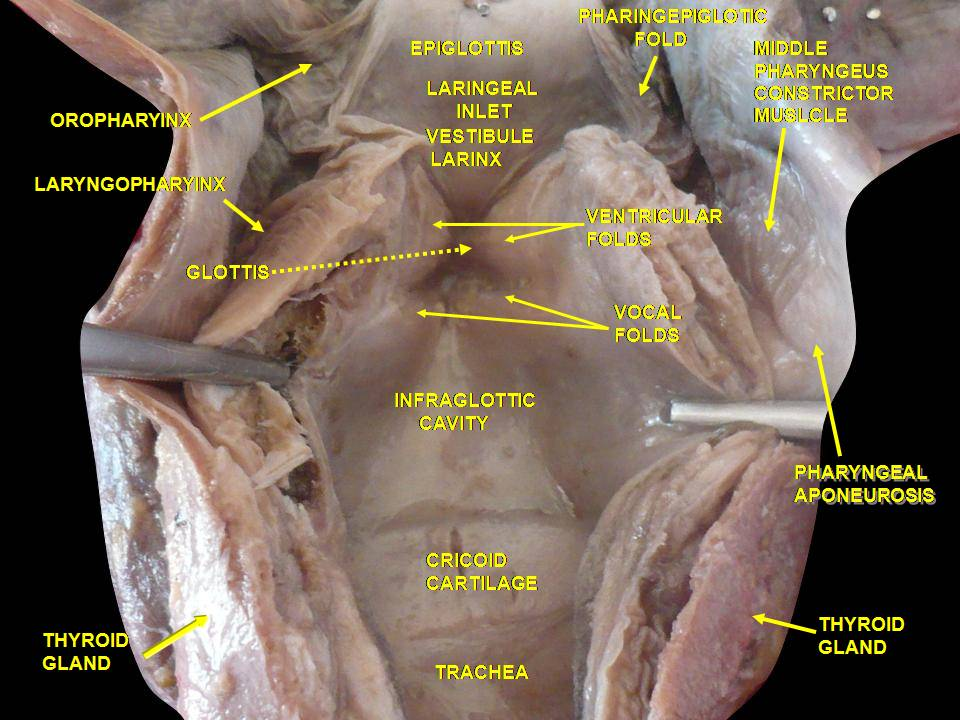
Larynx, pharynx and tongue. Deep dissection, posterior view.

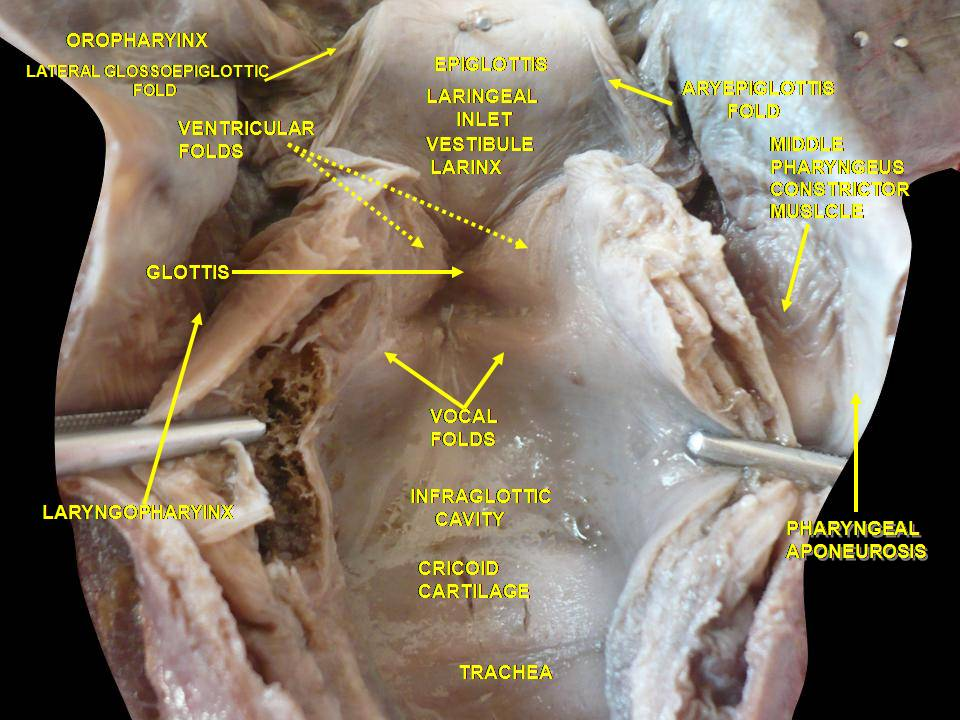
Larynx, pharynx and tongue. Deep dissection, posterior view.

== See also ==
- Buccopharyngeal fascia
