= Middle pharyngeal constrictor muscle =

Muscle in the neck

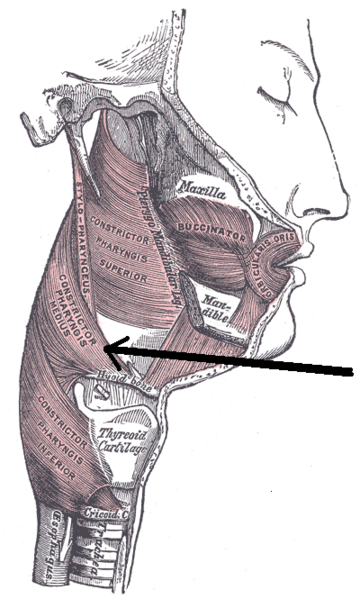
- Muscles of the pharynx and cheek (middle pharyngeal constrictor muscle labeled as constrictor pharyngis medius at center left)

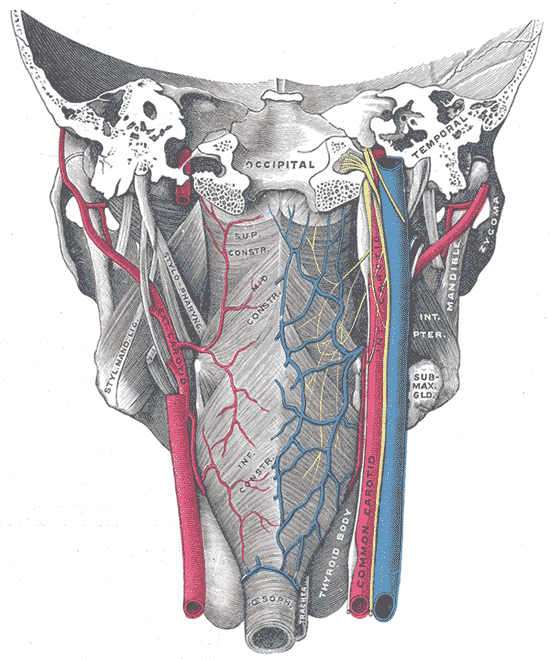
- Muscles of the pharynx, viewed from behind, together with the associated vessels and nerves (middle pharyngeal constrictor muscle labeled as Mid. constr. at center)

Details
- Origin: Hyoid bone
- Insertion: Pharyngeal raphe
- Artery: Ascending pharyngeal artery
- Nerve: Pharyngeal plexus of vagus nerve
- Actions: Swallowing

Identifiers
- Latin: musculus constrictor pharyngis medius
- TA98: A05.3.01.108
- TA2: 2184
- FMA: 46622

The middle pharyngeal constrictor is a fan-shaped muscle located in the neck. It is one of three pharyngeal constrictor muscles. It is smaller than the inferior pharyngeal constrictor muscle.

The middle pharyngeal constrictor originates from the greater cornu and lesser cornu of the hyoid bone, and the stylohyoid ligament. It inserts onto the pharyngeal raphe. It is innervated by a branch of the vagus nerve through the pharyngeal plexus. It acts to propel a bolus downwards along the pharynx towards the esophagus, facilitating swallowing.

== Structure ==
The middle pharyngeal constrictor is a sheet-like, fan-shaped muscle.

The muscle's fibers diverge from their origin: the more inferior fibres descend deep to the inferior pharyngeal constrictor muscle; the middle portion of fibres pass transversely; the more superior fibers ascend and overlap the superior pharyngeal constrictor muscle.

=== Origin ===
Two parts of the middle pharyngeal constrictor muscle are distinguished according to its sites of origin:

- Ceratopharyngeal part - arises (the entire superior margin of) the greater cornu of the hyoid bone.
- Chondropharyngeal part - arises from the lesser cornu of the hyoid bone, and (the inferior portion of) the stylohyoid ligament. The chondropharyngeal part represents the muscle's anterior origin.

=== Insertion ===
The muscle inserts (posteriorly) into the pharyngeal raphe, blending with its contralateral partner at the midline.

=== Innervation ===
Similarly to the superior and inferior pharyngeal constrictor muscles, it is innervated by a branch of the vagus nerve through the pharyngeal plexus.

=== Actions/movements ===
The contraction of the muscle constricts the middle portion of the pharynx.

== Function ==
The muscle contracts during swallowing: as soon as the bolus of food is received in the pharynx, the elevator muscles relax, the pharynx descends, and the constrictors contract upon the bolus, and convey it downward towards the esophagus.

They also have respiratory mechanical effects.

== Additional images ==
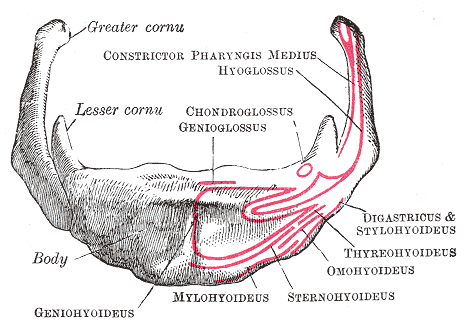
Hyoid bone. Anterior surface. Enlarged.

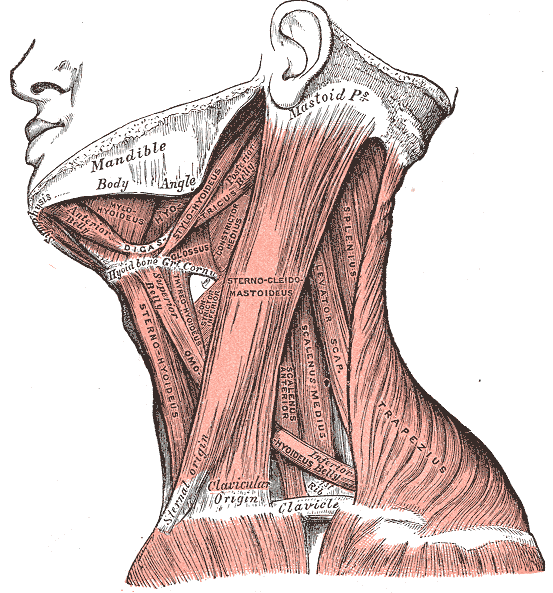
Muscles of the neck. Lateral view.

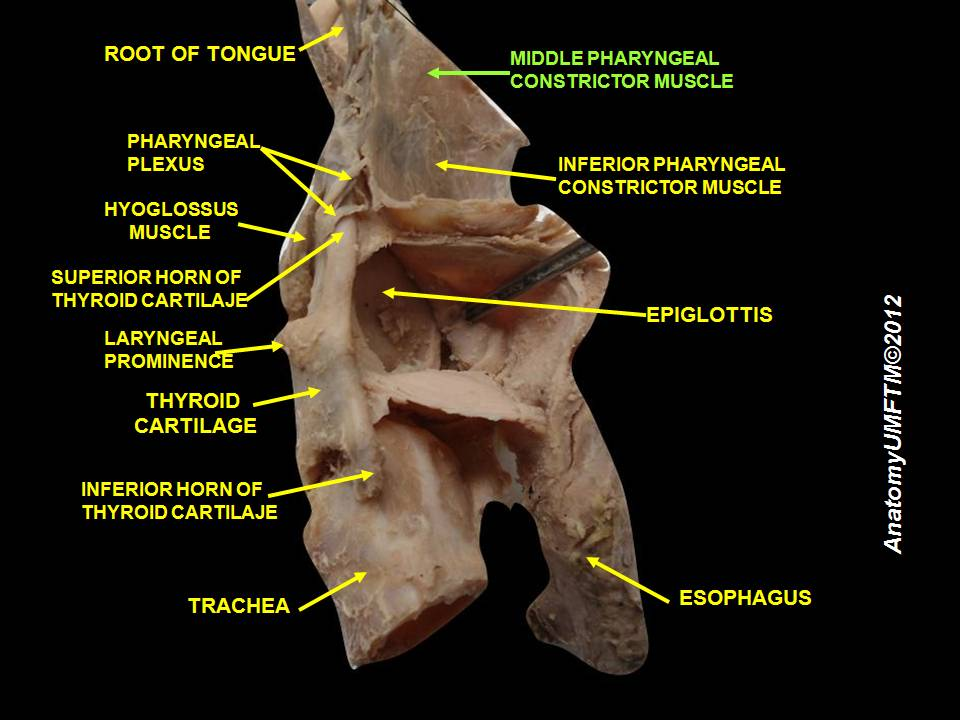
Middle pharyngeal constrictor muscle

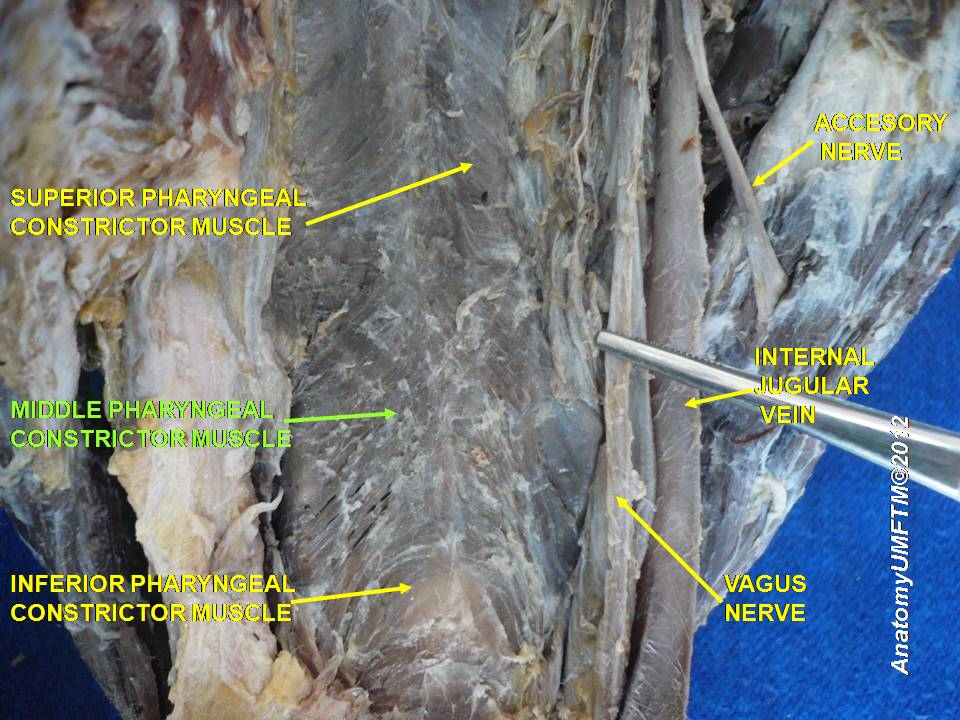
Middle pharyngeal constrictor muscle

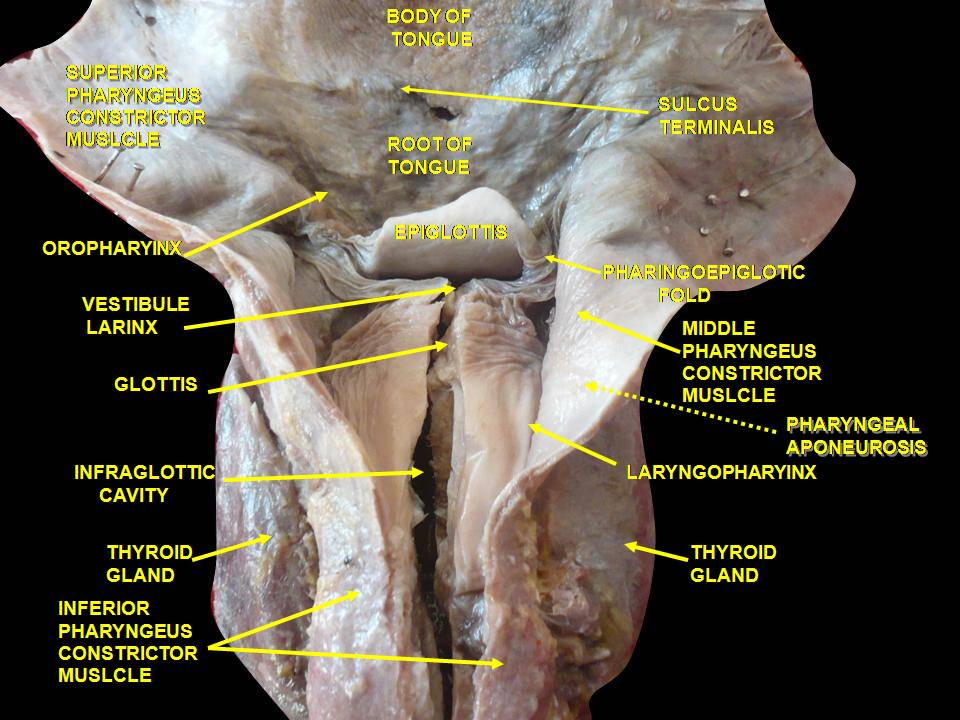
Deep dissection of larynx, pharynx and tongue seen from behind

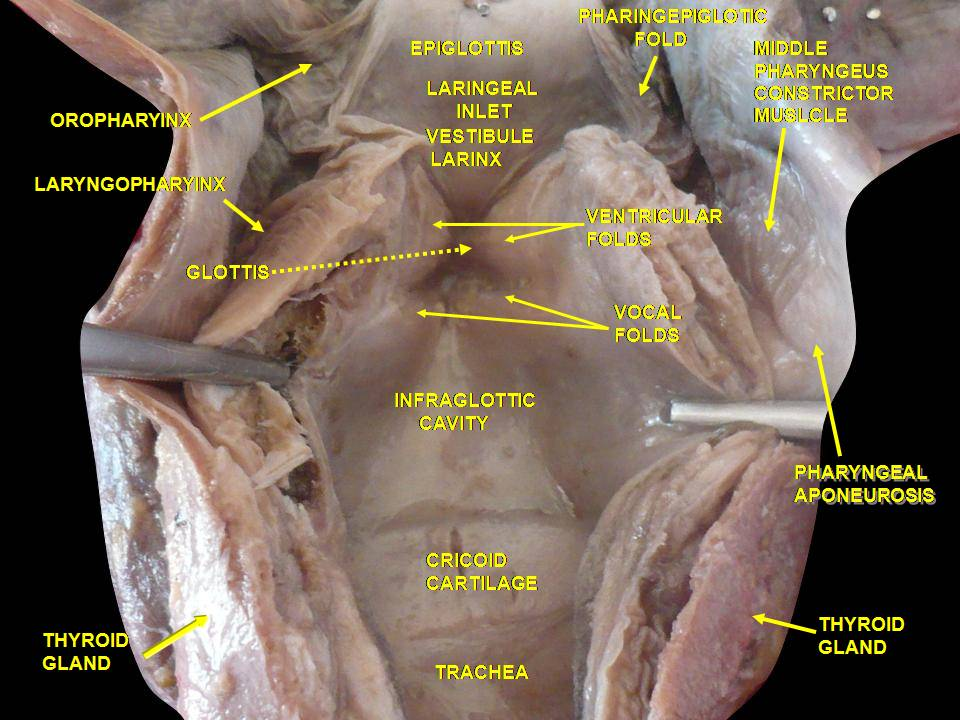
Deep dissection of larynx, pharynx and tongue seen from behind

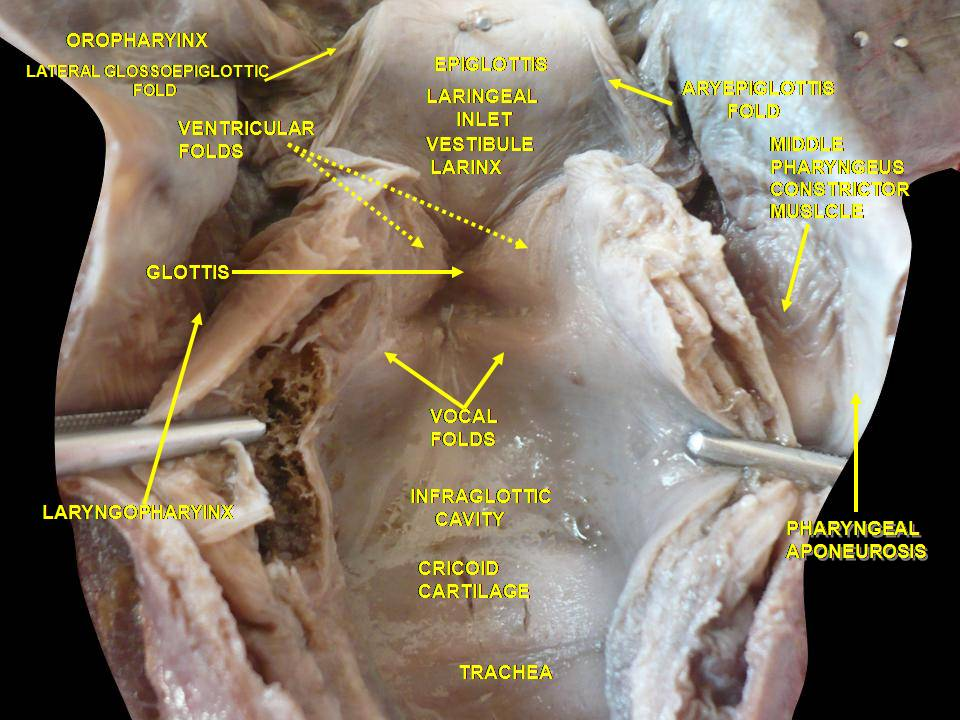
Deep dissection of larynx, pharynx and tongue seen from behind
