= Ascending pharyngeal artery =

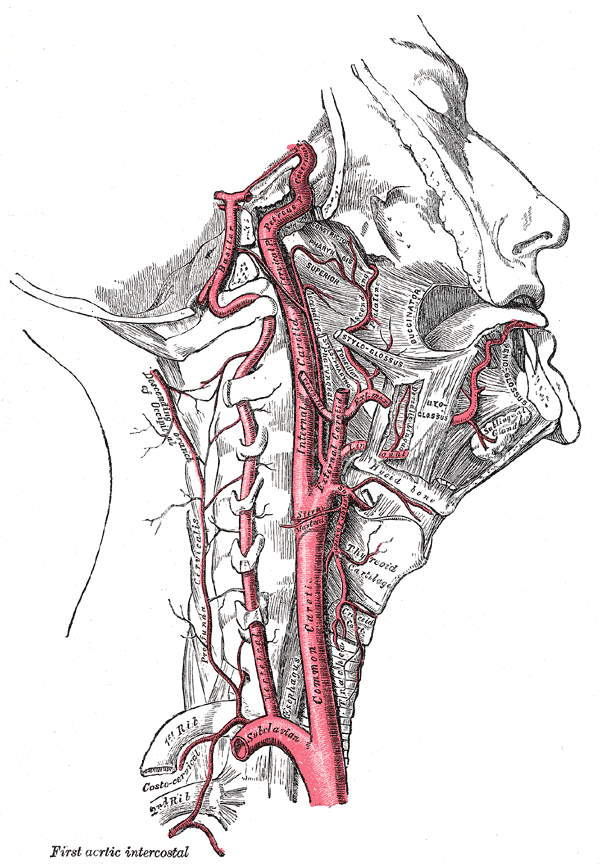
- The internal carotid and vertebral arteries. Right side.

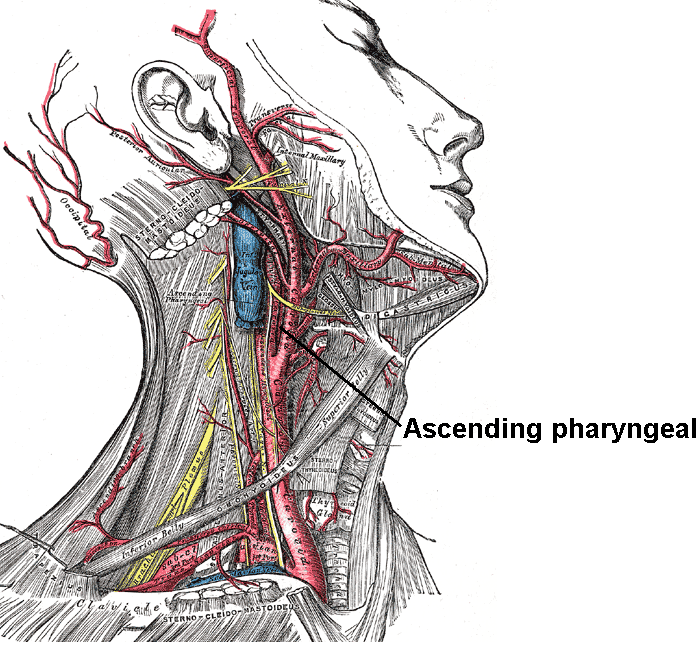
- Superficial dissection of the right side of the neck, showing the carotid and subclavian arteries.

Details
- Precursor: Aortic arch 2
- Source: External carotid artery
- Supplies: Pharynx

Identifiers
- Latin: arteria pharyngea ascendens
- TA98: A12.2.05.010
- TA2: 4378
- FMA: 49497

The ascending pharyngeal artery is an artery of the neck that supplies the pharynx.

Its named branches are the inferior tympanic artery, pharyngeal artery, and posterior meningeal artery (one of the meningeal branches).

== Anatomy ==
The ascending pharyngeal artery is a long and slender vessel.

It is deeply seated in the neck, beneath the other branches of the external carotid and under the stylopharyngeus muscle. It lies just superior to the bifurcation of the common carotid arteries.

=== Origin ===
It is the smallest and first medial branch of proximal external carotid artery, arising from the medial surface of the artery. Typically the superior thyroid artery arises from the external carotid before the ascending pharyngeal, but in variant anatomy the thyroid may arise earlier from the bifurcation or common carotid.

=== Course and relations ===
The artery ascends vertically in between the internal carotid artery and the pharynx to reach the base of the skull.

The artery is crossed by the styloglossus muscle and stylopharyngeus muscle. The longus capitis muscle is situated posterior to the artery.

=== Branches ===
The artery most typically bifurcates into embryologically distinct pharyngeal and neuromeningeal trunks.

The pharyngeal trunk usually consists of several branches which supply the middle and inferior pharyngeal constrictor muscles and the stylopharyngeus, ramifying in their substance and in the mucous membranes lining them. These branches are in hemodynamic equilibrium with contributors from the internal maxillary artery. The neuromeningeal trunk classically consists of jugular and hypoglossal divisions, which enter the jugular and hypoglossal foramina to supply regional meningeal and neural structures, being in equilibrium with branches of the vertebral, occipital, posterior meningeal, middle meningeal, and internal carotid arteries (via its caroticotympanic branch, meningohypophyseal, and inferolateral trunks). Also present is the inferior tympanic branch, which ascends towards the middle ear cavity; it is involved in internal carotid artery reconstitution via the "aberrant carotid artery" variant. The muscular branch of the ascending pharyngeal artery is in equilibrium with the odontoid arcade from the vertebral artery.

It typically has two branches: the inferior tympanic artery, and the posterior meningeal artery.

=== Anastomoses ===
The artery forms anastomoses with the palatine branch of facial artery, and ascending cervical arch of inferior thyroid artery.

=== Development ===
The artery develops from the proximal part of the embryonic second aortic arch.
