= Basilar part of occipital bone =

Section of the main skull bone that extends forward and upward

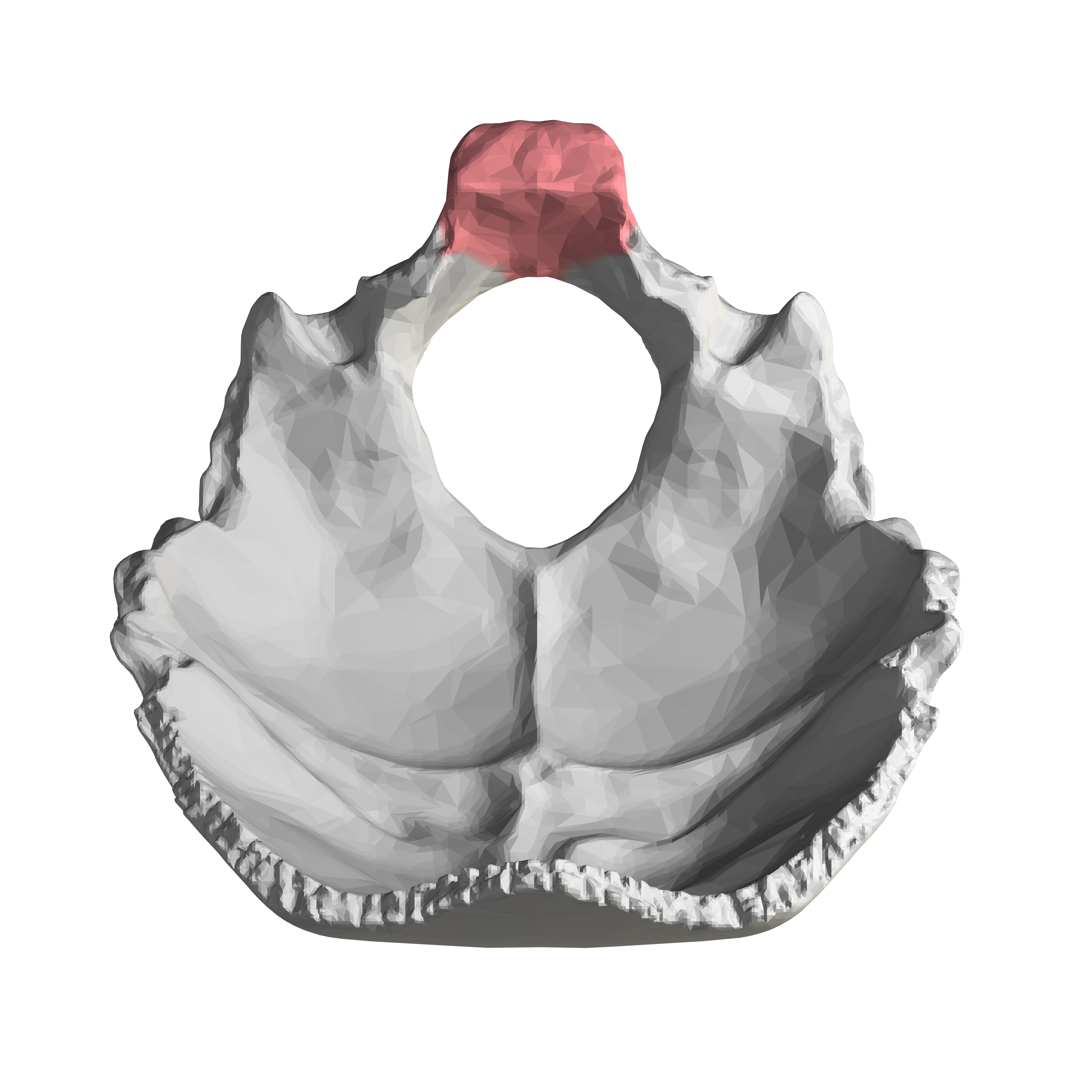
- Occipital bone inner surface (basilar part is shown in red)

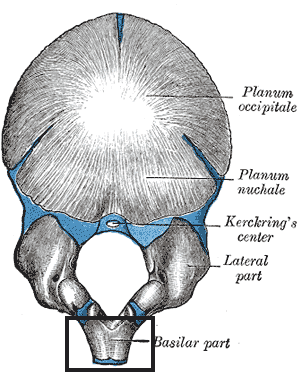
- Occipital bone outer surface, at birth (basilar part is at bottom)

Details

Identifiers
- Latin: pars basilaris ossis occipitalis
- TA98: A02.1.04.005
- TA2: 554
- FMA: 52858

The basilar part of the occipital bone extends forward and upward from the foramen magnum, and presents in front an area more or less quadrilateral in outline.

In the young skull, this area is rough and uneven, and is joined to the body of the sphenoid by a plate of cartilage.

By the twenty-fifth year, this cartilaginous plate is ossified, and the occipital and sphenoid form a continuous bone.

In other vertebrates, it forms a distinct bone, the basioccipital.

== Surfaces ==
On its lower surface, about 1 cm. in front of the foramen magnum, is the pharyngeal tubercle which gives attachment to the fibrous raphe of the pharynx.

On either side of the middle line the longus capitis and rectus capitis anterior are inserted, and immediately in front of the foramen magnum the anterior atlantooccipital membrane is attached.

The upper surface, which constitutes the lower half of the clivus, presents a broad, shallow groove which inclines upward and forward from the foramen magnum; it supports the medulla oblongata, and near the margin of the foramen magnum gives attachment to the tectorial membrane.

On the lateral margins of this surface are faint grooves for the inferior petrosal sinuses.

== In other animals ==
The human occipital is formed from the fusion of four bones: the supraoccipital, the paired exoccipitals, and the basioccipital. In most non-human osteichthyans, these bones remain separate or, if fused, are nevertheless considered distinct elements. The equivalent of the basilar part is the basioccipital.

== Additional images ==
Occipital bone. Basilar part shown in red.

Human skull seen from below. Basilar part shown in red.

Human skull seen from above (parietal bones have been removed). Basilar part shown in red.

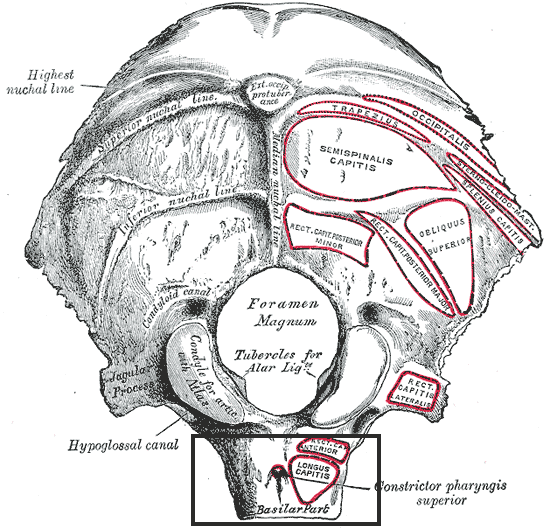
Occipital bone. Outer surface.

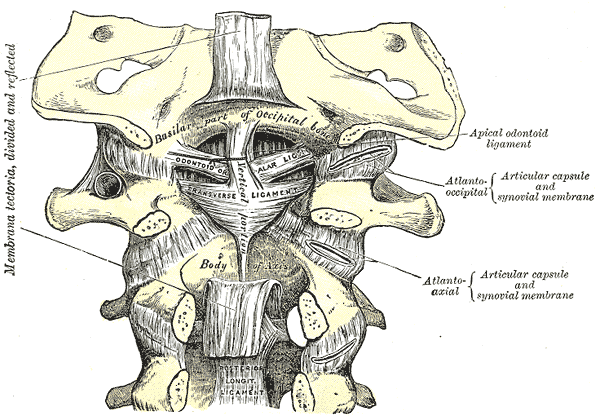
Membrana tectoria, transverse, and alar ligaments.

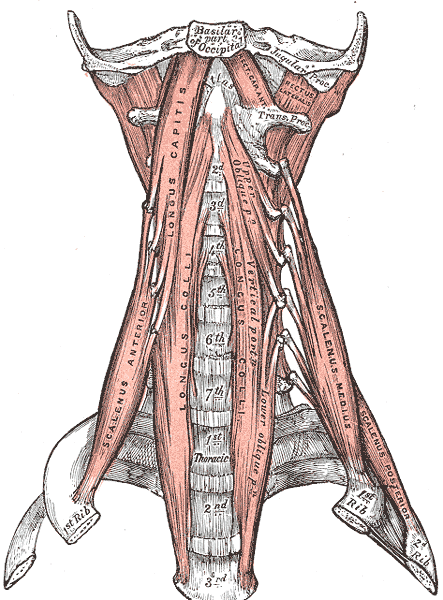
The anterior vertebral muscles.

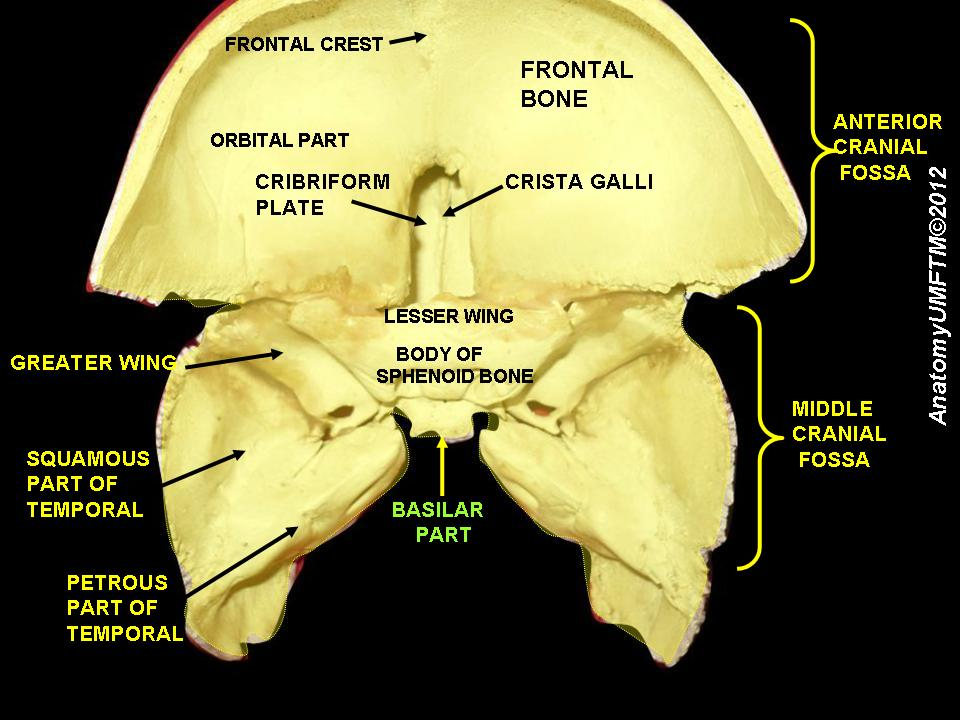
Basilar part of occipital bone

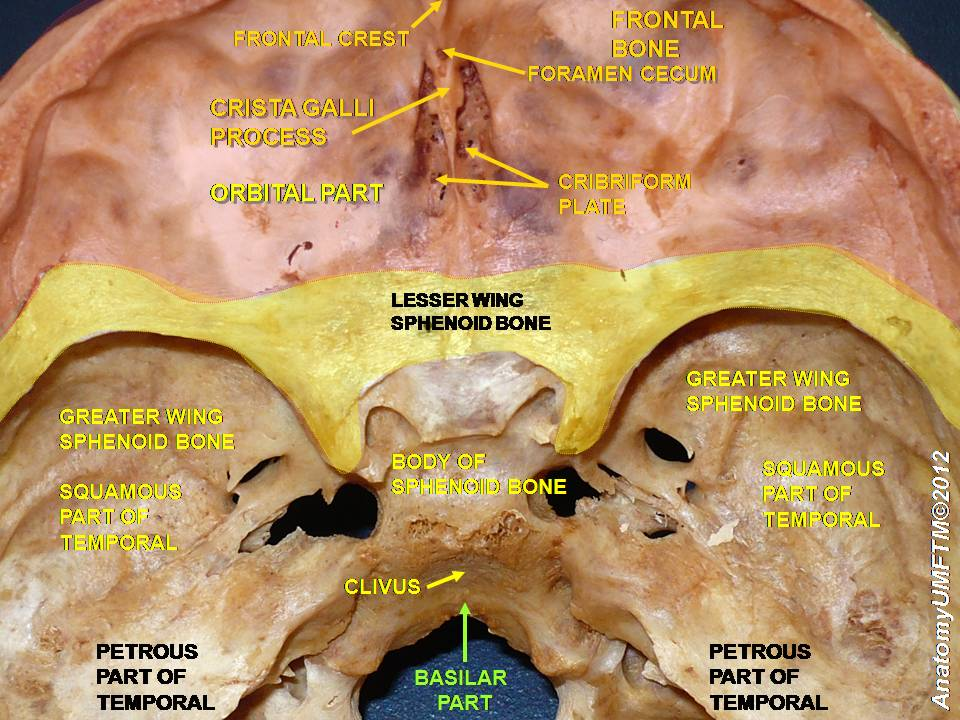
Basilar part of occipital bone

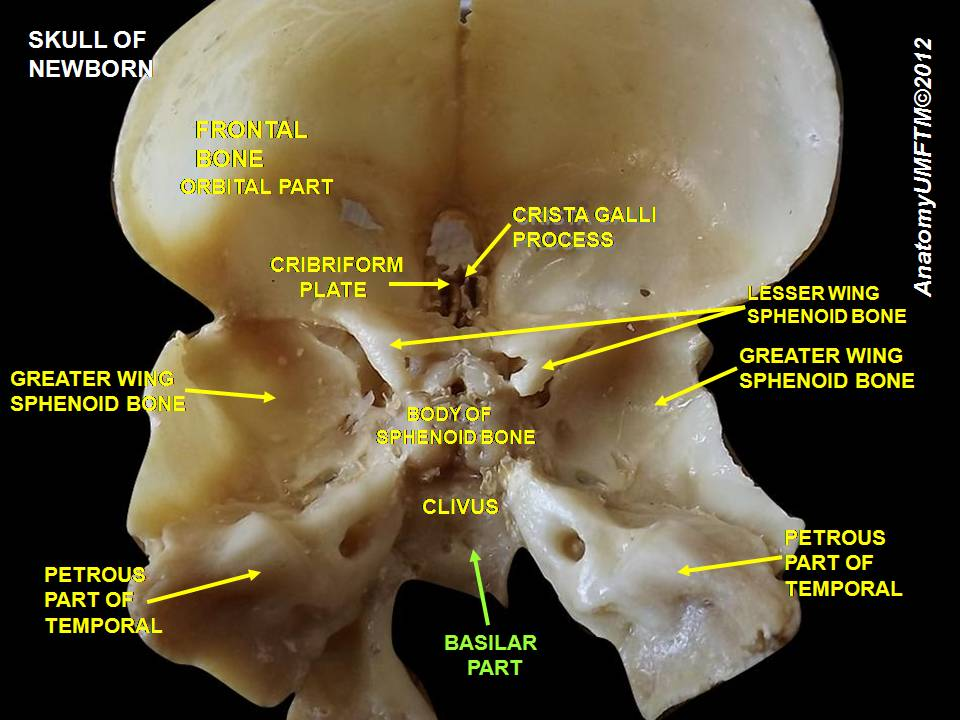
Basilar part of occipital bone

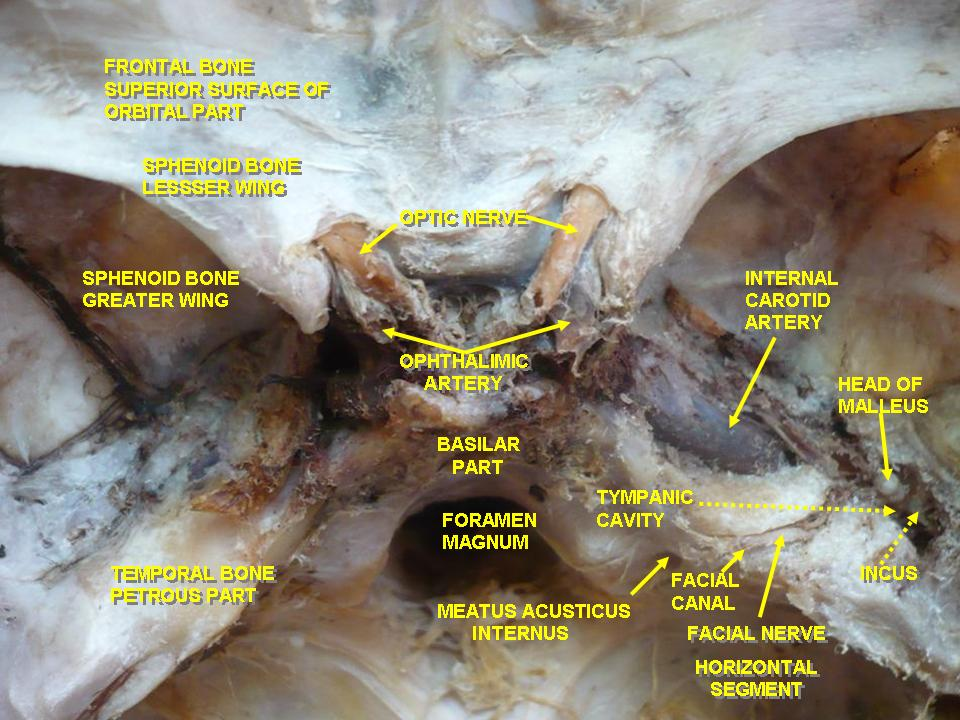
Tympanic cavity. Facial canal. Internal carotid artery.
