= Craniopharyngeal canal =

Canal in the sphenoid bone

- TA2: 593

The craniopharyngeal canal is a human anatomical feature sometimes found in the sphenoid bone opening to the sella turcica. It is a canal (a passage or channel) sometimes found extending from the anterior part of the fossa hypophyseos of the sphenoid bone to the under surface of the skull, and marks the original position of Rathke's pouch; while at the junction of the septum of the nose with the palate traces of the stomodeal end are occasionally present. This canal is found in 0.4% of individuals.
