= Longus capitis muscle =

Muscle of neck

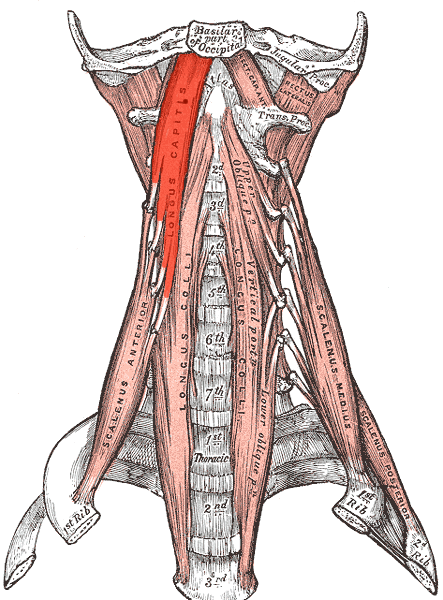
- The anterior vertebral muscles.

Details
- Origin: Anterior tubercles of the transverse processes of the third, fourth, fifth, and sixth cervical vertebræ
- Insertion: Basilar part of the occipital bone
- Artery: Ascending cervical artery, ascending pharyngeal artery, vertebral artery
- Nerve: C1-C3
- Actions: Flexion of neck at atlanto-occipital joint

Identifiers
- Latin: musculus longus capitis
- TA98: A04.2.01.003
- TA2: 2149
- FMA: 46308

The longus capitis muscle (Latin for long muscle of the head, alternatively rectus capitis anticus major) is broad and thick above, narrow below, and arises by four tendinous slips, from the anterior tubercles of the transverse processes of the third, fourth, fifth, and sixth cervical vertebræ, and ascends, converging toward its fellow of the opposite side, to be inserted into the inferior surface of the basilar part of the occipital bone.

It is innervated by the anterior rami of the first to third cervical spinal nerves (C1–C3).

Longus capitis has several actions:

acting unilaterally, to:

- flex the head and neck laterally
- rotate the head ipsilaterally

acting bilaterally:

- flex the head and neck

== Additional images ==
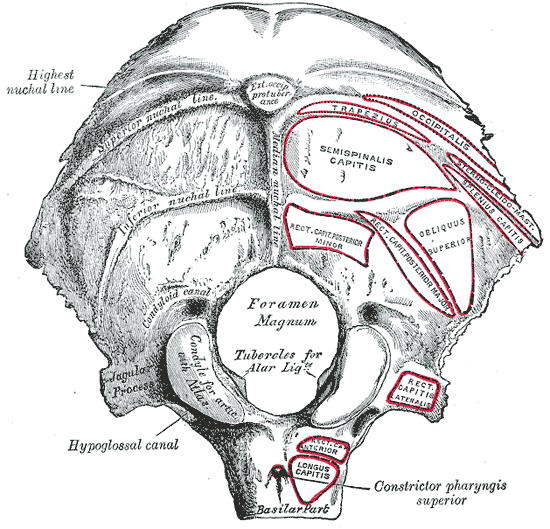
Occipital bone. Outer surface.

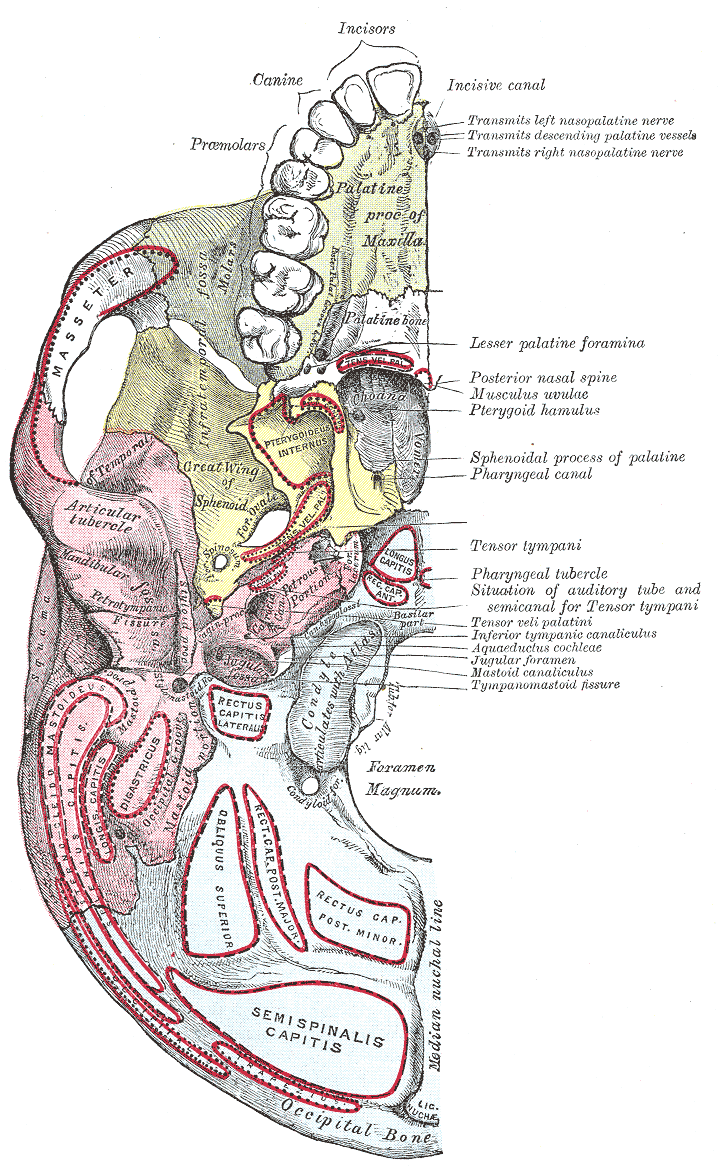
Base of skull. Inferior surface.

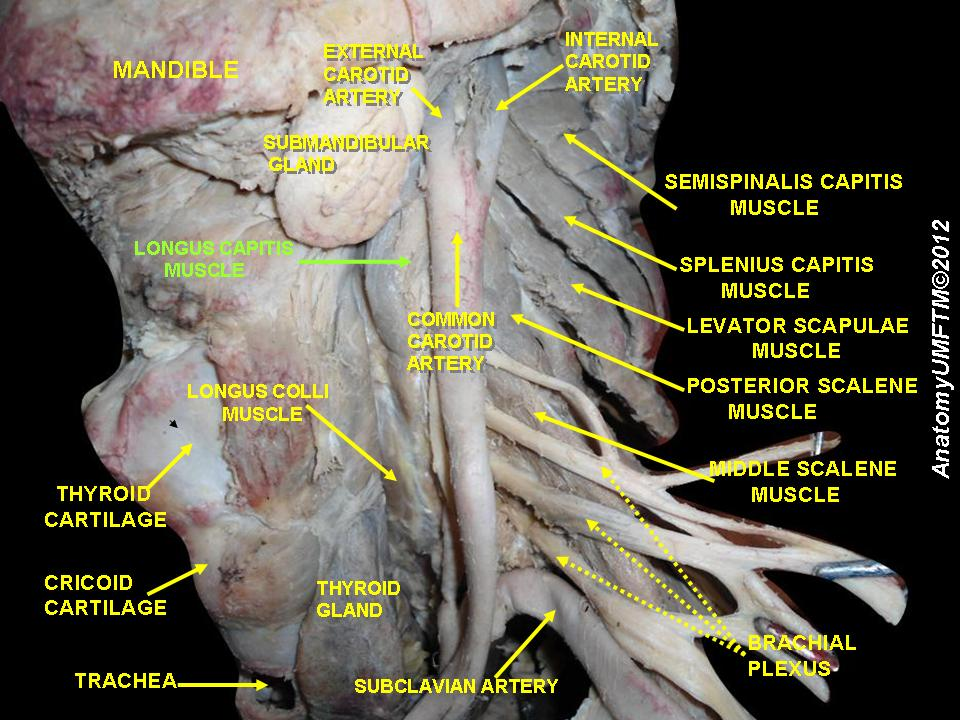
Longus capitis muscle

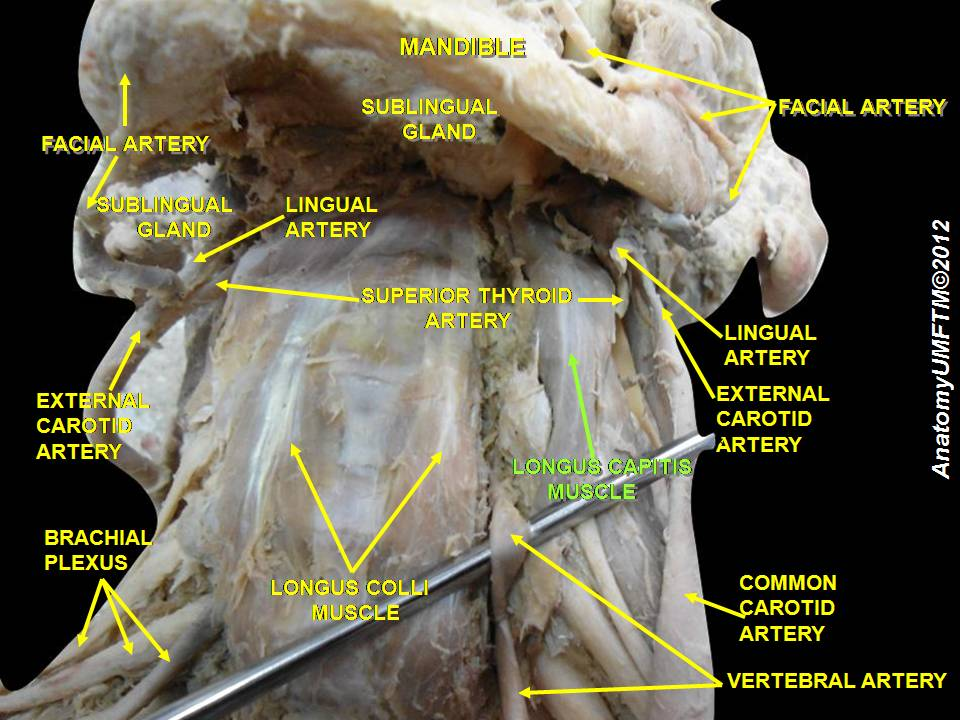
Longus capitis muscle
