= Pharyngeal raphe =

Type of biological tissue in humans

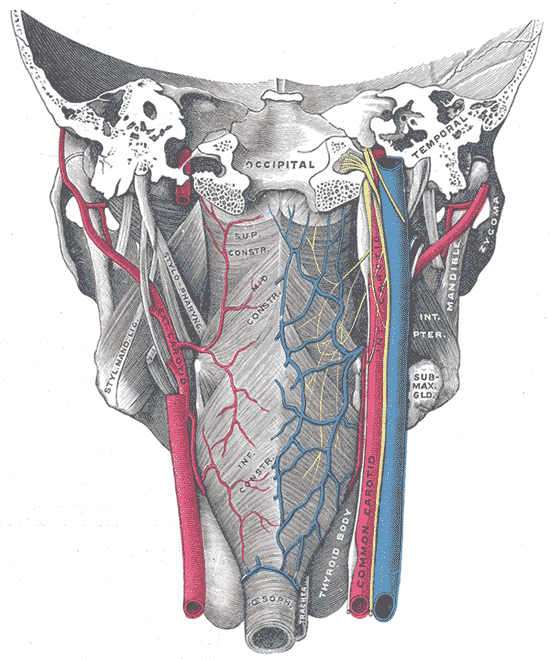
- Muscles of the pharynx, viewed from behind, together with the associated vessels and nerves. (Pharyngeal raphe not labeled, but region is visible.)

Details

Identifiers
- Latin: raphe pharyngis
- TA98: A05.3.01.101
- TA2: 2177
- FMA: 55077

The pharyngeal raphe is a raphe that serves as the posterior attachment for several of the pharyngeal constrictors (thyropharyngeal part of the inferior pharyngeal constrictor muscle, middle pharyngeal constrictor muscle, superior pharyngeal constrictor muscle). Two sides of the pharyngeal wall are joined posteriorly in the midline by the raphe. Superiorly, it attaches to the pharyngeal tubercle; inferiorly, it extends to the level of vertebra C6 where it blends with the posterior wall of the esophagus.
