= List of skeletal muscles of the human body =

This is a table of skeletal muscles of the human anatomy, with muscle counts and other information.

Skeletal muscle maps
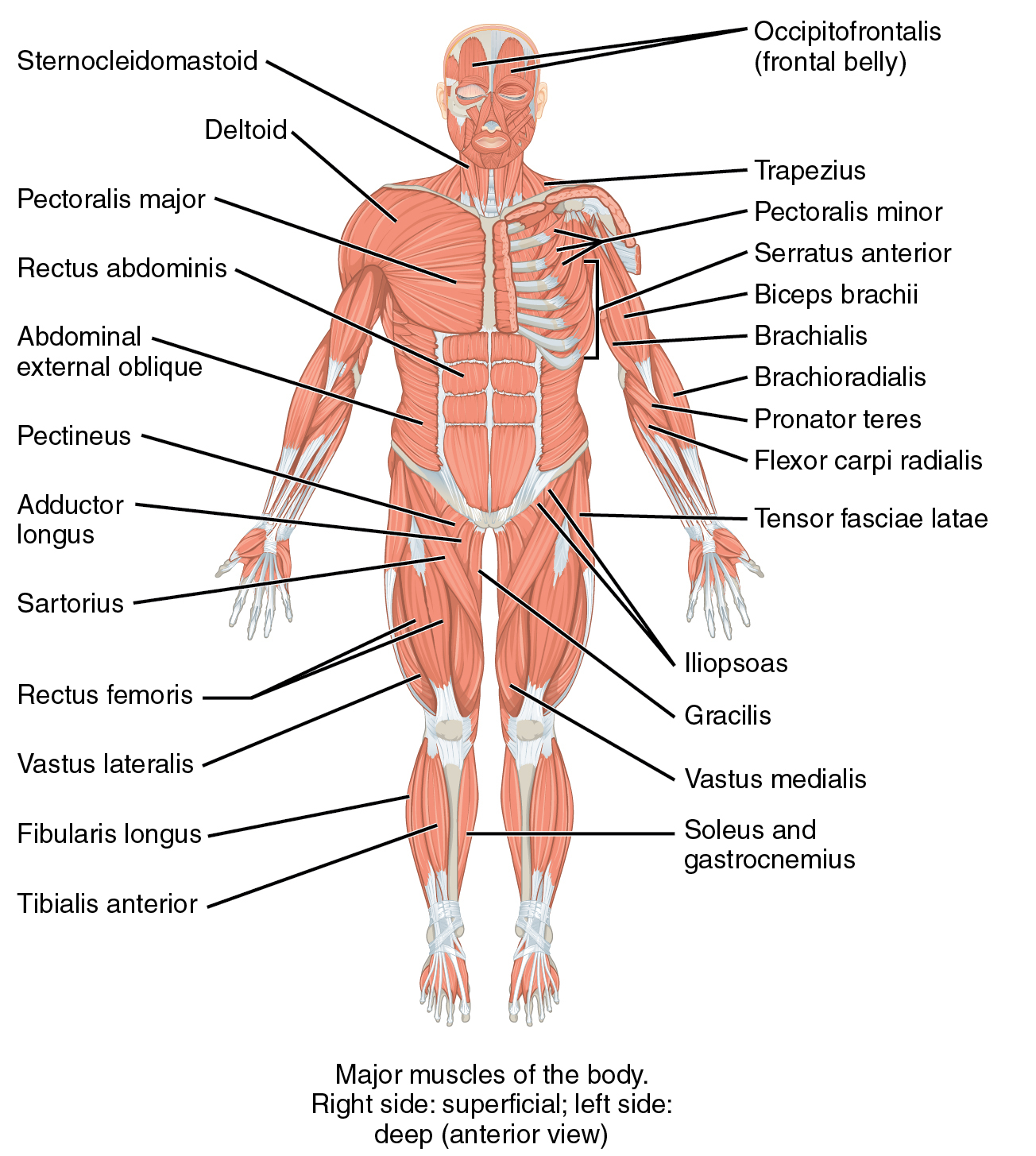
Anterior view

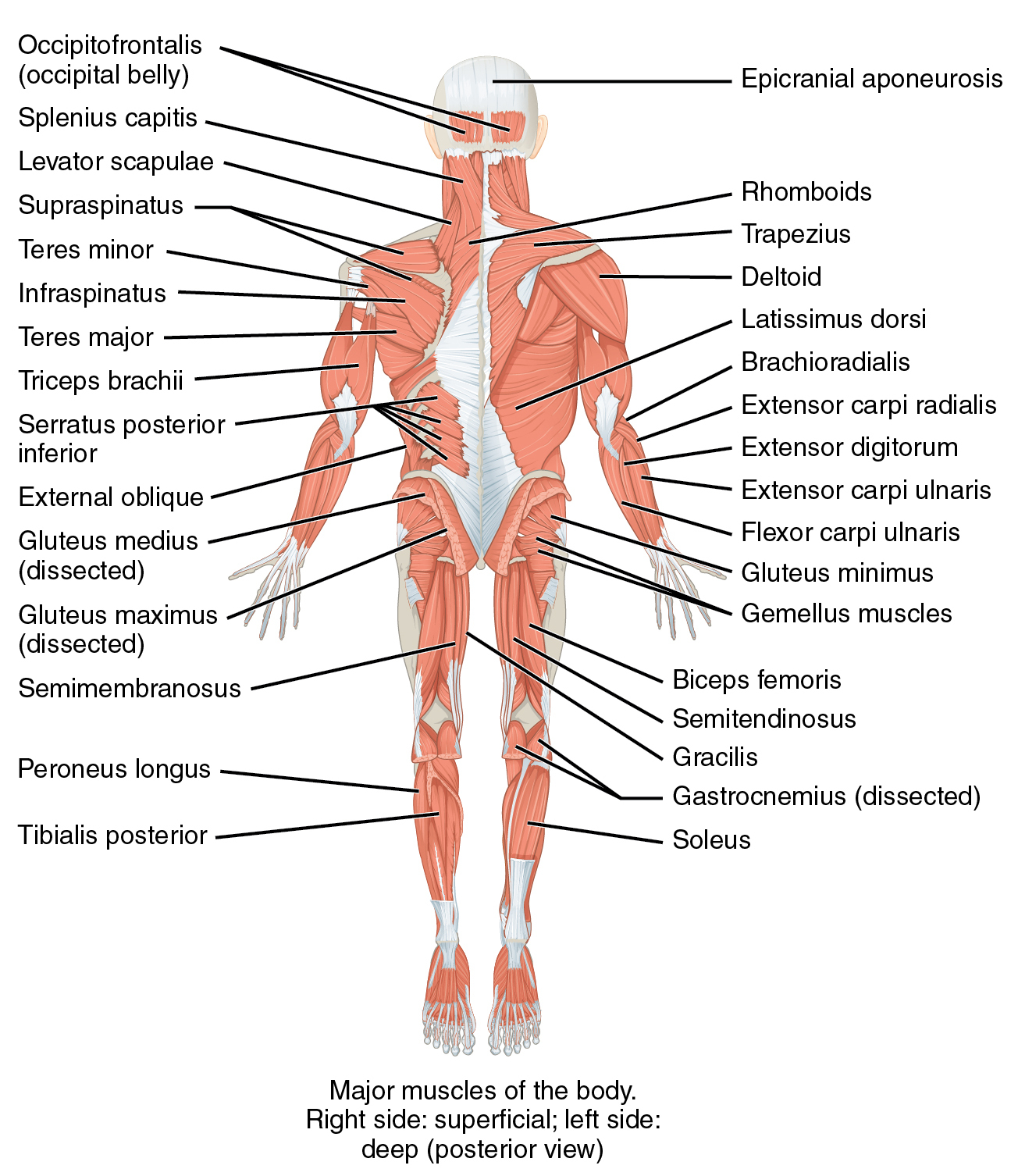
Posterior view

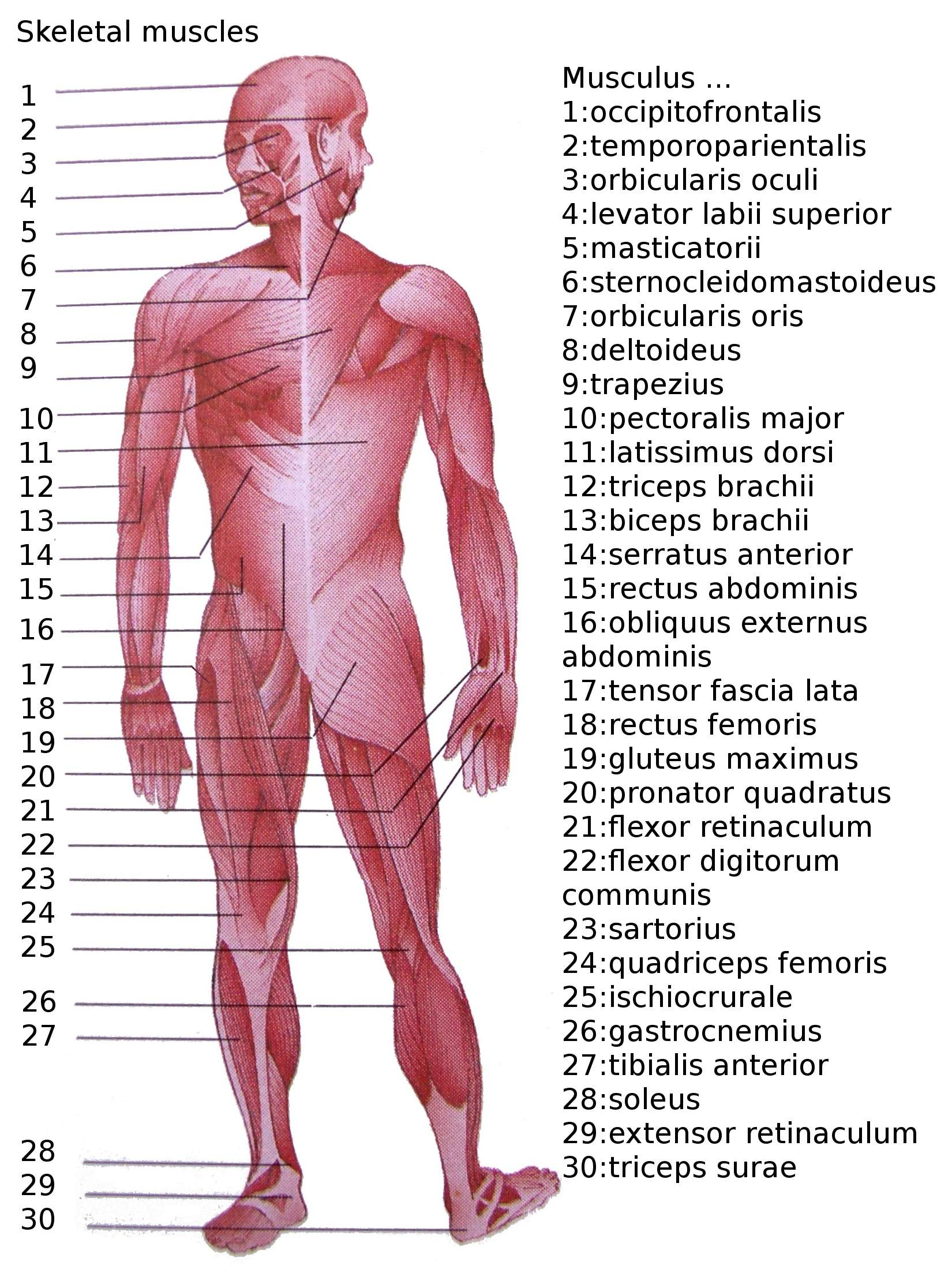
A more detailed overview

== Table ==
Muscle	Location	Origin	Insertion	Artery	Nerve	Action	Antagonist	O	TA
occipitalis	head, occipitofrontalis, back of skull (left/right)	superior nuchal line of occipital bone, mastoid part of temporal bone	epicranial aponeurosis	occipital artery	facial nerve [CNVII], posterior auricular nerve	retracts scalp	?	2	1
frontalis	head, occipitofrontalis, forehead (left/right)	skin of eyebrow and glabella	epicranial aponeurosis	ophthalmic artery	facial nerve [CNVII], temporal branch	wrinkles eyebrow	procerus, corrugator supercilii, and orbicularis oculi muscles	2	1
orbicularis oculi, orbital part	head, forehead/eyelid (left/right)	frontal bone	lateral palpebral raphe	ophthalmic artery, zygomatico-orbital artery, angular artery	facial nerve [CNVII], zygomatic branch	closes eyelids (voluntary, winking/squeezing)	levator palpebrae superioris	2	3
orbicularis oculi, palpebral part	head, forehead/eyelid (left/right)	medial palpebral ligament	lateral palpebral raphe	ophthalmic artery, zygomatico-orbital artery, angular artery	facial nerve [CNVII], zygomatic branch	closes eyelids (involuntary, blinking/sleeping)	levator palpebrae superioris	2	3
orbicularis oculi, deep palpebral (lacrimal) part	head, forehead/eyelid (left/right)	posterior crest of lacrimal bone	Edges of eyelids	ophthalmic artery, zygomatico-orbital artery, angular artery	facial nerve [CNVII], zygomatic branch	facilitates tear ducts	?	2	3
corrugator supercilii	head, eye (left/right)	nasal part of frontal bone	intermediate third of skin of eyebrow	ophthalmic artery	facial nerve [CNVII], zygomatic branch	moves skin of forehead medially and inferiorly (towards root of nose)	?	2	1
depressor supercilii	head, eye (left/right)	nasal part of frontal bone, medial rim of orbit	medial third of skin of eyebrow	ophthalmic artery	facial nerve [CNVII], zygomatic branch	moves skin of eyebrows inferiorly	?	2	1
levator palpebrae superioris	head, extraocular (left/right)	sphenoid bone	tarsal plate, upper eyelid	ophthalmic artery	oculomotor nerve [CNIII]	retracts and elevates eyelid	orbicularis oculi	2	1
superior tarsal	head, extraocular (left/right)	underside of levator palpebrae superioris	superior tarsal plate of eyelid	ophthalmic artery	sympathetic nervous system	raises upper eyelid	?	2	1
rectus, superior	head, eye, orbit (left/right)	annulus of Zinn at orbital apex	7.5 mm superior to corneal limbus	ophthalmic artery	oculomotor nerve [CNIII], superior branch	adducts, elevates, and medially rotates eye	Oblique Superior and inferior	2	1
rectus, inferior	head, eye, orbit (left/right)	annulus of Zinn at orbital apex	6.5 mm inferior to corneal limbus	ophthalmic artery	oculomotor nerve [CNIII], inferior branch	adducts and depresses eye	Oblique Superior and inferior	2	1
rectus, medial	head, eye, orbit (left/right)	annulus of Zinn at orbital apex	5.5 mm medial to corneal limbus	ophthalmic artery	oculomotor nerve [CNIII], inferior branch	adducts eye	Oblique Superior and inferior	2	1
rectus, lateral	head, eye, orbit (left/right)	annulus of Zinn at orbital apex	7 mm temporal to corneal limbus	ophthalmic artery	abducens nerve [CNVI]	abducts eye	Oblique Superior and inferior	2	1
oblique, superior	head, extraocular (left/right)	annulus of Zinn at orbital apex, medial to optic canal	outer posterior quadrant of eyeball	ophthalmic artery, lateral muscular branch	trochlear nerve [CNIV]	abducts, intorts, and depress eye	right medial, superior, and inferior recti (superior and inferior oblique muscles are the synergists)	2	1
oblique, inferior	head, extraocular (left/right)	orbital surface of maxilla, lateral to lacrimal groove	laterally onto eyeball, deep to lateral rectus, by a short flat tendon	ophthalmic artery	oculomotor nerve [CNIII]	abducts, extorts, and elevates eye	right medial, superior, and inferior recti (superior and inferior oblique muscles are the synergists)	2	1
temporoparietalis	head, ear, outer ear (left/right)	auriculares muscles	epicranial aponeurosis		facial nerve [CNVII]	fixes galeal aponeurosis		2	1
auricularis anterior	head, ear, auricular, extrinsic (left/right)	temporal fascia	front of helix of ear	posterior auricular artery	facial nerve [CNVII]	pulls auricle forwards		2	1
auricularis superior	head, ear, auricular, extrinsic (left/right)	epicranial aponeurosis	dorsocranial surface of auricle	posterior auricular artery	facial nerve [CNVII]	pulls auricle upwards		2	1
auricularis posterior	head, ear, auricular, extrinsic (left/right)	mastoid process of temporal bone, tendon of sternocleidomastoid	dorsal part of auricle	posterior auricular artery	facial nerve [CNVII]	pulls auricle backwards	?	2	1
helicis major	head, ear, auricular, intrinsic (left/right)	Spina helicis	Anterior border of the helix	Auricular branches of posterior auricular and auricular branch of occipital arteries	Facial nerve	depresses the anterior margin of the ear cartilage	?	2	1
helicis minor	head, ear, auricular, intrinsic (left/right)	Base of the helical crus	Anterior aspect of the helical crus	Auricular branches of posterior auricular and auricular branch of occipital arteries	Facial nerve, Posterior auricular nerve branch	Adjusts the shape of the anterior margin of the ear cartilage	?	2	1
tragicus	head, ear, auricular, intrinsic (left/right)	Base of the tragus	Apex of the tragus	Auricular branches of posterior auricular and auricular branch of occipital arteries	Facial nerve	Increase the opening of the external acoustic meatus	?	2	1
antitragicus	head, ear, auricular, intrinsic (left/right)	Outer part of the antitragus	Cauda helicis and antihelix	Auricular branch of superficial temporal and auricular branches of posterior auricular artery	Facial nerve	Modifies the auricular shape	?	2	1
auricle, transverse	head, ear, auricular, intrinsic (left/right)	Cranial surface of the eminentia conchae	Cranial surface of the eminentia scaphae	Auricular branches of posterior auricular and auricular branch of occipital arteries	Facial nerve	Flattens the cranial profile outer ear	?	2	1
auricle, oblique	head, ear, auricular, intrinsic (left/right)	?	?	?	Facial nerve, posterior auricular nerve	?	?	2	1
Muscle of terminal notch	head, ear, auricular, intrinsic (left/right)	?	?	?	?	?	?	0	1
stapedius	head, ear, inner ear (left/right)	tip of pyramid of middle ear	neck of stapes	stapedial branch of posterior auricular artery	nerve to the stapedius from facial nerve [CNVII]	reduces movement of stapes, controls amplitude of sound waves to inner ear		2	1
tensor tympani	head, ear, inner ear (left/right)	Eustachian tube	handle of malleus	superior tympanic artery	medial pterygoid nerve from mandibular nerve [CNV_{3}]	tenses tympanic membrane, controls amplitude of sound waves to inner ear		2	1
procerus	head, nose (left/right)	fascia over lower part of nasal bone	skin of lower part of forehead between eyebrows	facial artery	facial nerve [CNVII], buccal branch	draws down medial angle of eyebrow (giving expressions of frowning)		2	1
depressor septi nasi	head, nose (left/right)	incisive fossa of maxilla	nasal septum and back part of alar part of nasalis	superior labial artery	facial nerve [CNVII], buccal branch	depresses nasal septum		2	1
levator nasolabialis (levator labii superioris alaeque nasi)	head, nose (left/right)	frontal process of maxilla	nostril and upper lip	superior labial artery	facial nerve [CNVII], buccal branch	dilates nostril, elevates upper lip, elevates wing of nose		2	1
nasalis, transverse part	head, nose, nasalis, transverse part (left/right)	alveolar yoke of canine tooth	lateral nasal cartilage	superior labial artery	facial nerve [CNVII], buccal branch	compresses nostrils		2	2
nasalis, alar part	head, nose, nasalis, alar part (left/right)	alveolar yoke of lateral incisor tooth, greater and lesser alar cartilages	skin near margin of nostril	superior labial artery	facial nerve [CNVII], buccal branch	dilates nostrils		2	2
levator anguli oris	head, mouth (left/right)	maxilla	modiolus of mouth	facial artery	facial nerve [CNVII]	elevates angle of mouth (smile)	depressor anguli oris	2	1
depressor anguli oris	head, mouth (left/right)	tubercle of mandible	modiolus of mouth	facial artery	facial nerve [CNVII], mandibular branch	depresses angle of mouth (frown)	levator anguli oris	2	1
transversus menti	head, mouth (left/right)	continuation of depressor anguli oris muscles	other side of depressor anguli oris muscles	facial artery	facial nerve [CNVII], mandibular branch or buccal branch	depresses angle of mouth (frown)	levator anguli oris	0.6	1
levator labii superioris	head, mouth (left/right)	medial part of infra-orbital margin of maxilla	skin and muscle of upper lip (labii superioris)	superior labial artery	facial nerve [CNVII], buccal branch	elevates upper lip		2	1
depressor labii inferioris	head, mouth (left/right)	oblique line of mandible, between symphysis and mental foramen	integument of lower lip, orbicularis oris fibers, its fellow of opposite side	inferior labial artery	facial nerve [CNVII], marginal mandibular branch	depresses lower lip		2	1
mentalis	head, mouth (left/right)	alveolar yoke of lower, lateral incisor tooth, found on anterior mandible	skin of chin	inferior labial artery	facial nerve [CNVII], marginal mandibular branch	elevates and wrinkles skin of chin, protrudes lower lip		2	1
bucinator (buccinator)	head, mouth (left/right)	alveolar processes of maxilla and mandible, pterygomandibular raphe	fibres of orbicularis oris	buccal artery	facial nerve [CNVII], buccal branch	compress cheeks against teeth (blowing), mastication		2	1
orbicularis oris, marginal part	head, mouth (left/right)	maxilla and mandible	skin around lips	superior labial artery, inferior labial artery	facial nerve [CNVII], buccal branch	puckers lips		2	2
orbicularis oris, labial part	head, mouth (left/right)	maxilla and mandible	skin around lips	superior labial artery, inferior labial artery	facial nerve [CNVII], buccal branch	puckers lips		2	2
risorius	head, mouth (left/right)	parotid fascia	modiolus of mouth	facial artery	facial nerve [CNVII], buccal branch	draw back angle of mouth		2	1
zygomaticus major	head, mouth (left/right)	zygomatic bone in region of zygomaticomaxillary suture	modiolus of mouth	facial artery	facial nerve [CNVII], buccal branch	draws angle of mouth upward and laterally		2	1
zygomaticus minor	head, mouth (left/right)	zygomatic bone in region of zygomaticomaxillary suture	skin of upper lip	facial artery	facial nerve [CNVII], buccal branch	elevates upper lip		2	1
masseter, superficial part	head, coronal plane (left/right)	anterior two-thirds of inferior margin of zygomatic arch and maxilla	angle of mandible, masseteric tuberosity of mandible	masseteric artery	masseteric nerve from mandibular nerve [CNV_{3}]	elevates and retracts mandible (closes mouth)	platysma	2	2
masseter, deep part	head, coronal plane (left/right)	anterior two-thirds of inferior margin of zygomatic arch and maxilla	angle of mandible, masseteric tuberosity of mandible	masseteric artery	masseteric nerve from mandibular nerve [CNV_{3}]	elevates and retracts mandible (closes mouth)	platysma	2	2
temporalis	head, coronal plane (left/right)	temporal lines on parietal bone of skull	coronoid process of mandible	deep temporal arteries	deep temporal nerves from mandibular nerve [CNV_{3}]	elevates and retracts mandible (closes mouth)	platysma	2	1
pterygoid, lateral	head, coronal plane (left/right)	greater wing of sphenoid and lateral pterygoid process	condyloid process of mandible	maxillary artery, pterygoid branches	external pterygoid nerve from mandibular nerve [CNV_{3}]	depresses mandible (opens mouth)	masseter, temporalis, medial pterygoid	2	1
pterygoideus proprius	head, coronal plane (left/right)	Infratemporal crest of the greater wing of sphenoid	Lateral pterygoid plate of the sphenoid bone	?	?	None	?	0	1
pterygoid, medial	head, coronal plane (left/right)	medial side of lateral pterygoid plate behind upper teeth (deep head); pyramidal process of palatine bone and maxillary tuberosity (superficial head)	medial angle of mandible	maxillary artery, pterygoid branches	mandibular nerve [CNV_{3}], medial pterygoid nerve	elevates mandible, closes jaw, helps lateral pterygoid in moving jaw from side to side		2	1
genioglossus, inferior fibers	head, tongue (left/right)	superior part of mental spine of mandible (symphysis menti)	dorsum of tongue, body of hyoid	lingual artery	hypoglossal nerve [CNXII]	protrudes tongue		2	3
genioglossus, middle fibers	head, tongue (left/right)	superior part of mental spine of mandible (symphysis menti)	dorsum of tongue, body of hyoid	lingual artery	hypoglossal nerve [CNXII]	depresses tongue		2	3
genioglossus, superior fibers	head, tongue (left/right)	superior part of mental spine of mandible (symphysis menti)	dorsum of tongue, body of hyoid	lingual artery	hypoglossal nerve [CNXII]	draws tip of tongue back and down		2	3
hyoglossus (ceratoglossus)	head, tongue (left/right)	hyoid	side of tongue		hypoglossal nerve [CNXII]	depresses tongue		2	1
chondroglossus	head, tongue (left/right)	lesser cornu and body of hyoid bone	intrinsic muscular fibers of tongue		hypoglossal nerve [CNXII]	depresses tongue (some consider this muscle to be part of hyoglossus)		2	1
styloglossus	head, tongue (left/right)	styloid process of temporal bone	tongue	lingual artery, sublingual branch	hypoglossal nerve [CNXII]	elevates and retracts tongue	inferior and middle fibers of genioglossus	2	1
palatoglossus	head, tongue and soft palate (left/right)	palatine aponeurosis	tongue		vagus nerve [CNX], pharyngeal plexus and accessory nerve [CNXI]	raises back part of tongue, aiding in breathing		2	1
superior longitudinal lingual	head, tongue (left/right)	close to epiglottis, from median fibrous septum	edges of tongue	lingual artery, tonsilar branch of facial artery, ascending pharyngeal artery	hypoglossal nerve [CNXII]	shortens tongue, turns tip upward, turns lateral margins upward		2	1
transversus linguae	head, tongue (left/right)	median fibrous septum	sides of tongue	lingual artery, tonsilar branch of facial artery, ascending pharyngeal artery	hypoglossal nerve [CNXII]	narrows tongue with no elongation		2	1
inferior longitudinal lingual	head, tongue (left/right)	root of tongue	apex of tongue	lingual artery, tonsilar branch of facial artery, ascending pharyngeal artery	hypoglossal nerve [CNXII]	shortens tongue, retracts, pulls tip downward		2	1
verticalis linguae	head, tongue (left/right)	dorsum of tongue	inferior surface borders of tongue	lingual artery, tonsilar branch of facial artery, ascending pharyngeal artery	hypoglossal nerve [CNXII]			2	1
tensor veli palatini	head, soft palate (left/right)	medial pterygoid plate of sphenoid bone	palatine aponeurosis		mandibular nerve [CNV_{3}], medial pterygoid nerve	tenses soft palate, aids in swallowing	?	2	1
levator veli palatini	head, soft palate (left/right)	temporal bone, Eustachian tube	palatine aponeurosis	facial artery	vagus nerve [CNX], pharyngeal plexus	elevates soft palate	?	2	1
palatopharyngeus	head, soft palate (left/right)	palatine aponeurosis and hard palate	upper border of thyroid cartilage (blends with constrictor fibers)	facial artery	vagus nerve [CNX], pharyngeal branch	aids in breathing by pulling pharynx and larynx		2	1
uvulae	head, soft palate (left/right)	hard palate	soft tissue of uvula		vagus nerve [CNX], pharyngeal branch	moves and changes shape of uvula		2	1
stylopharyngeus	head, pharynx (left/right)	styloid process of temporal bone	thyroid cartilage (pharynx)	ascending pharyngeal artery, pharyngeal branches	glossopharyngeal nerve [CNIX]	elevates larynx, elevates pharynx, swallowing		2	1
salpingopharyngeus	head, pharynx (left/right)	cartilage of Eustachian tube	posterior fasciculus of pharyngopalatinus		vagus nerve [CNX], accessory nerve [CNXI]	raises nasopharynx		2	1
pharyngeal constrictor, inferior, thyropharyngeal part	head, pharynx (left/right)	cricoid cartilage, thyroid cartilage	pharyngeal raphe	ascending pharyngeal artery, pharyngeal branches	vagus nerve [CNX], superior laryngeal nerve, external laryngeal branch and recurrent laryngeal nerve	swallowing		2	2
pharyngeal constrictor, inferior, cricopharyngeal part	head, pharynx (left/right)	cricoid cartilage, thyroid cartilage	pharyngeal raphe	ascending pharyngeal artery, pharyngeal branches	vagus nerve [CNX], superior laryngeal nerve, external laryngeal branch and recurrent laryngeal nerve	swallowing		2	2
pharyngeal constrictor, middle, chondropharyngeal part	head, pharynx (left/right)	hyoid bone	pharyngeal raphe	ascending pharyngeal artery, pharyngeal branches	vagus nerve [CNX], pharyngeal plexus	swallowing		2	2
pharyngeal constrictor, middle, ceratopharyngeal part	head, pharynx (left/right)	hyoid bone	pharyngeal raphe	ascending pharyngeal artery, pharyngeal branches	vagus nerve [CNX], pharyngeal plexus	swallowing		2	2
pharyngeal constrictor, superior, pterygopharyngeal part	head, pharynx (left/right)	medial pterygoid plate, pterygomandibular raphé, alveolar process	pharyngeal raphe, pharyngeal tubercle	ascending pharyngeal artery, tonsilar branch of facial artery	vagus nerve [CNX], pharyngeal plexus	swallowing		2	4
pharyngeal constrictor, superior, buccopharyngeal part	head, pharynx (left/right)	medial pterygoid plate, pterygomandibular raphé, alveolar process	pharyngeal raphe, pharyngeal tubercle	ascending pharyngeal artery, tonsilar branch of facial artery	vagus nerve [CNX], pharyngeal plexus	swallowing		2	4
pharyngeal constrictor, superior, mylopharyngeal part	head, pharynx (left/right)	medial pterygoid plate, pterygomandibular raphé, alveolar process	pharyngeal raphe, pharyngeal tubercle	ascending pharyngeal artery, tonsilar branch of facial artery	vagus nerve [CNX], pharyngeal plexus	swallowing		2	4
pharyngeal constrictor, superior, glossopharyngeal part	head, pharynx (left/right)	medial pterygoid plate, pterygomandibular raphé, alveolar process	pharyngeal raphe, pharyngeal tubercle	ascending pharyngeal artery, tonsilar branch of facial artery	vagus nerve [CNX], pharyngeal plexus	swallowing		2	4
cricothyroid, straight part	head, larynx (left/right)	anterior and lateral cricoid cartilage	inferior cornu and lamina of thyroid cartilage	cricothyroid branch of superior thyroid artery	vagus nerve [CNX], superior laryngeal nerve, external laryngeal branch	tenses and elongates vocal folds (has minor adductory effect)		2	1
cricothyroid, oblique part	head, larynx (left/right)	anterior and lateral cricoid cartilage	inferior cornu and lamina of thyroid cartilage	cricothyroid branch of superior thyroid artery	vagus nerve [CNX], superior laryngeal nerve, external laryngeal branch	tenses and elongates vocal folds (has minor adductory effect)		2	1
arytenoid, transverse	head, larynx (left/right)	arytenoid cartilage on one side	arytenoid cartilage on opposite side	superior laryngeal branch of superior thyroid artery	vagus nerve [CNX], recurrent laryngeal nerve	approximates arytenoid cartilages (closes rima glottidis)		2	1
arytenoid, oblique	head, larynx (left/right)	arytenoid cartilage on one side	arytenoid cartilage on opposite side	superior laryngeal branch of superior thyroid artery	vagus nerve [CNX], recurrent laryngeal nerve	approximates arytenoid cartilages (closes rima glottidis)		2	1
arytenoid, oblique, aryepiglottic part	head, larynx (left/right)	apex of arytenoid	lateral border of epiglottis	laryngeal branch of superior thyroid artery	vagus nerve [CNX], inferior laryngeal nerve	closes the laryngeal inlet	?	2	0
vocalis	head, larynx (left/right)	inner (anterior) surface of thyroid cartilage	anterior surface of arytenoid cartilage		vagus nerve [CNX], recurrent laryngeal nerve	thickens and decreases length of vocal folds, adducts during speech		2	1
thyroarytenoid, thyroepiglottic part	head, larynx (left/right)	inner (anterior) surface of thyroid cartilage	anterior surface of arytenoid cartilage		vagus nerve [CNX], recurrent laryngeal nerve	thickens and decreases length of vocal folds, adducts during speech		2	1
thyroarytenoid, external part	head, larynx (left/right)	inner (anterior) surface of thyroid cartilage	anterior surface of arytenoid cartilage		vagus nerve [CNX], recurrent laryngeal nerve	thickens and decreases length of vocal folds, adducts during speech		2	1
cricoarytenoid, posterior	head, larynx (left/right)	posterior part of cricoid cartilage	muscular process of arytenoid cartilage		vagus nerve [CNX], recurrent laryngeal nerve	abducts and laterally rotates cartilage, pulling vocal ligaments away from midline and forward and so opening rima glottidis	lateral cricoarytenoid	2	1
cricoarytenoid, lateral	head, larynx (left/right)	lateral part of arch of cricoid cartilage	muscular process of arytenoid cartilage		vagus nerve [CNX], recurrent laryngeal nerve	adducts and medially rotates cartilage, pulling vocal ligaments towards midline and backwards and so closing rima glottidis	posterior cricoarytenoid	2	1
ceratocricoideus	head, larynx (left/right)	?	?	?	?	?	?	0	1
platysma	Neck, Clavicular, Right, left	base of mandible	inferior clavicle and fascia of chest	branches of submental artery, branches of suprascapular artery	cervical branch of facial nerve [CNVII]	tenses skin of neck	masseter, temporalis	2	1
sternocleidomastoid	Neck, Clavicular, Right, left	manubrium sterni (sternal head), medial portion of clavicle (clavicular head)	mastoid process of temporal bone, superior nuchal line	occipital artery, superior thyroid artery	motor: accessory nerve sensory: cervical plexus	tilts head to its own side, rotates head so face is turned towards opposite side, flexes neck, raises sternum, assists in forced inspiration	??	2	1
digastric, anterior belly	Neck, Suprahyoid, Right/left	digastric fossa (mandible)	intermediate tendon (lesser horn of hyoid bone)	submental branch of facial artery	mandibular nerve [CNV_{3}] via mylohyoid nerve	opens jaw when masseter and temporalis are relaxed	??	2	2
digastric, posterior belly	Neck, Suprahyoid, Right/left	mastoid process of temporal bone	intermediate tendon (lesser horn of hyoid bone)	occipital artery	facial nerve [CNVII]	opens jaw when masseter and temporalis are relaxed	??	2	2
stylohyoid	Neck, Suprahyoid, Right/left	styloid process of temporal bone	greater horn of hyoid bone	occipital artery	facial nerve [CNVII]	elevates hyoid during swallowing	??	2	1
mylohyoid	Neck, Suprahyoid, Right/left	mylohyoid line of mandible	pharyngeal raphe	mylohyoid branch of inferior alveolar artery	mylohyoid nerve, from inferior alveolar branch of mandibular nerve [CNV_{3}]	raises oral cavity floor, elevates hyoid, depresses mandible	??	2	1
geniohyoid	Neck, Suprahyoid, Right/left	mandibular symphysis	anterior surface of body of hyoid bone		C1 via hypoglossal nerve	elevates hyoid and tongue upward during swallowing	??	2	1
sternohyoid	Neck, Infrahyoid, Right/left	sternum, manubrium	hyoid bone	superior thyroid artery	ansa cervicalis	depresses hyoid	??	2	1
sternothyroid	Neck, Infrahyoid, Right/left	sternum, manubrium	thyroid cartilage	superior thyroid artery	ansa cervicalis	depresses larynx, may slightly depress hyoid	??	2	1
thyrohyoid	Neck, Infrahyoid, Right/left	thyroid cartilage	hyoid bone	superior thyroid artery	C1	depress hyoid	??	2	1
omohyoid, superior belly	Neck, Infrahyoid, Right/left	upper border of scapula	hyoid bone	inferior thyroid artery	ansa cervicalis	depresses larynx, depresses and moves to side hyoid	??	2	2
omohyoid, inferior belly	Neck, Infrahyoid, Right/left	upper border of scapula	hyoid bone	inferior thyroid artery	ansa cervicalis	depresses larynx, depresses and moves to side hyoid	??	2	2
levator glandulae thyroideae	Neck, Infrahyoid, Right/left	thyrohyoid muscle	thyroid isthmus	?	ansa cervicalis	?	?	0	1
longus colli	Neck, Anterior	transverse processes of vertebrae C3, C4, C5, and C6	anterior arch of atlas	ascending pharyngeal artery, vertebral artery	C2, C3, C4, C5, C6	flexes neck and head	??	2	1
longus capitis	Neck, Anterior	anterior tubercles of transverse processes of vertebrae C3, C4, C5, and C6	basilar part of occipital bone	??	C1, C2, C3/C4	flexes neck at atlanto-occipital joint	??	2	1
rectus capitis, anterior	Neck, Anterior	atlas	occipital bone	??	C1	flexes neck at atlanto-occipital joint	??	2	1
rectus capitis, lateralis	Neck, Anterior/Lateral, Right/left	upper surface of transverse process of atlas (C1)	under surface of jugular process of occipital bone	??	C1	laterally flexes neck, stabilises sidebens at atlanto-occipital joint	??	2	1
scalenus anterior	Neck, Lateral, Right/left	cervical vertebrae C3-C6	first rib	inferior thyroid artery, ascending cervical artery	ventral ramus of C5, C6	when neck is fixed, elevates first rib to aid in breathing; when rib is fixed, bends neck forward and sideways and rotates it to opposite side	??	2	1
scalenus medius	Neck, Lateral, Right/left	cervical vertebrae C2-C6	first rib	inferior thyroid artery, ascending cervical artery	ventral rami of third to eighth cervical spinal nerves	elevates first rib, rotates neck to opposite side	??	2	1
scalenus posterior	Neck, Lateral, Right/left	cervical vertebrae C4 – C6, transverse processes	second rib	ascending cervical artery and superficial cervical artery	C6, C7, C8	elevates second rib, tilts neck to same side	??	2	1
scalenus minimus	Neck, Lateral, Right/left	cervical vertebrae C7	first rib	superficial cervical artery	C7, C8	elevates first rib	??	0	1
levator scapulae	Neck/Upper Limb, Verterbral Column, Lateral, Right/left	posterior tubercles of transverse processes of C1 – C4 vertebrae	superior part of medial border of scapula	dorsal scapular artery	cervical nerve (C3, C4) and dorsal scapular nerve (C5)	elevates scapula, tilts glenoid cavity inferiorly by rotating scapula	serratus anterior	2	1
obliquus capitis, superior	Neck, Posterior/Lateral, Right/left	lateral mass of atlas	lateral half of inferior nuchal line	??	suboccipital nerve	flexes head to same side	??	2	1
obliquus capitis, inferior	Neck, Posterior/Lateral, Right/left	spinous process of axis	lateral mass of atlas	??	suboccipital nerve	rotates neck	??	2	1
rectus capitis, posterior minor	Neck, Posterior	tubercle on posterior arch of atlas (C1)	medial part of inferior nuchal line of occipital bone and surface between it and foramen magnum	??	a branch of dorsal primary division of suboccipital nerve	sensory organ for neck position, also extends head at neck	??	2	1
rectus capitis, posterior major	Neck, Posterior	spinous process of axis (C2)	inferior nucheal line of occipital bone	occipital artery	dorsal ramus of C1 (suboccipital nerve)	rotates and extends head to same side	??	2	1
rectus abdominis	Torso, Abdomen, right/left	pubic symphysis, pubic crest	xiphoid process, costal cartilages of ribs 5–7	inferior epigastric artery, superior epigastric artery; contributions from posterior intercostal arteries, subcostal arteries, and deep circumflex arteries	intercostal nerves, subcostal nerve	flexes trunk, compresses abdominal organs, aids in expiration	erector spinae	2	1
external abdominal oblique	Torso, Abdomen, right/left	external surfaces of ribs 5–12	linea alba, pubic tubercle, anterior half of iliac crest	lower posterior intercostal arteries, subcostal artery, deep circumflex iliac artery	motor: intercostal nerves (T7-T11), subcostal nerve sensory: iliohypogastric nerve	flexes trunk to same side, rotates trunk to opposite side, expiration, compresses abdominal organs		2	1
internal abdominal oblique	Torso, Abdomen, right/left	anterior two-thirds of iliac crest, iliopectineal arch, thoracolumbar fascia	inferior borders of ribs 10–12, pubic crest	lower posterior intercostal arteries, subcostal artery, superior epigastric artery, inferior epigastric artery, superficial circumflex iliac artery, deep circumflex iliac artery, posterior lumbar arteries	intercostal nerves (T7-T11), subcostal nerve, iliohypogastric nerve, ilioinguinal nerve	flexes trunk to same side, rotates trunk to opposite side, expiration, compresses abdominal organs		2	1
cremaster	Torso, Abdomen, inguinal canal and scrotum	Internal oblique	Tunica vaginalis	Cremasteric artery	Genital branch of genitofemoral nerve	raise and lower the scrotum (involuntary)	?	0-1(M)	1
transversus abdominis	Torso, Abdomen, right/left	internal surface of costal cartilage of ribs 7–12, thoracolumbar fascia, anterior two-thirds of iliac crest, iliopectineal arch	linea alba, aponeurosis of internal oblique muscle, pubic crest	lower posterior intercostal arteries, subcostal artery, superior epigastric artery, inferior epigastric artery, superficial circumflex iliac artery, deep circumflex iliac artery, posterior lumbar arteries	intercostal nerves T7-T11, subcostal nerve, iliohypogastric nerve, ilioinguinal nerve	rotates trunk to same side, compresses abdominal organs, expiration		2	1
pyramidalis	Torso, Abdomen, right/left	pubic symphysis, pubic crest	linea alba	inferior epigastric artery	subcostal nerve	tenses linea alba		2	1
quadratus lumborum	Torso, Abdomen, right/left	iliac crest, iliolumbar ligament	inferior border of rib 12, transverse processes of L1-L4	lumbar, median sacral, iliolumbar, subcostal arteries	subcostal nerve, anterior rami of spinal nerves L1-L4	flexes trunk to same side, fixes rib 12 during inspiration, extends trunk		2	1
iliocostalis colli	Torso, Back, right/left	sacrum, iliac crest, thoracolumbar fascia, spinous processes	ribs	lateral sacral artery	posterior branch of spinal nerve	extends/flexes vertebral column	rectus abdominis	2	1
iliocostalis lumborum	Torso, Back, right/left	sacrum, iliac crest, thoracolumbar fascia, spinous processes	The lower six or seven ribs	lateral sacral artery	posterior branch of spinal nerve	extends/flexes vertebral column	rectus abdominis	2	1
iliocostalis thoracis	Torso, Back, right/left	sacrum, iliac crest, thoracolumbar fascia, spinous processes(the lower six ribs)	upper six ribs and the transverse process of CVII	lateral sacral artery	posterior branch of spinal nerve	extends/flexes vertebral column	rectus abdominis	2	1
longissimus capitis	Torso/Neck, Back, right/left	articular processes of C4-C7; transverse processes of T1-T5	posterior margin of mastoid process	lateral sacral artery	posterior branch of spinal nerve	extends/flexes vertebral column, flexes head and neck to same side	rectus abdominis	2	1
longissimus colli	Torso, Back, right/left	transverse process	transverse process	lateral sacral artery	posterior branch of spinal nerve	extends/flexes vertebral column	rectus abdominis	2	1
longissimus thoracis	Torso, Back, right/left	transverse process	transverse process	lateral sacral artery	posterior branch of spinal nerve	extends/flexes vertebral column	rectus abdominis	2	1
longissimus thoracis, lumbar part	Torso, Back, right/left	transverse process	transverse process	lateral sacral artery	posterior branch of spinal nerve	extends/flexes vertebral column	rectus abdominis	2	0
spinalis capitis	Torso, Back, right/left	spinous process	spinous process	lateral sacral artery	posterior branch of spinal nerve	extends/flexes vertebral column	rectus abdominis	2	1
spinalis colli	Torso, Back, right/left	spinous process	spinous process	lateral sacral artery	posterior branch of spinal nerve	extends/flexes vertebral column	rectus abdominis	2	1
spinalis thoracis	Torso, Back, right/left	spinous process	spinous process	lateral sacral artery	posterior branch of spinal nerve	extends/flexes vertebral column	rectus abdominis	2	1
latissimus dorsi	Torso/Upper Limb, Back, Vertebral column, right/left	Spinous processes of vertebrae T6-S5, thoracolumbar fascia, iliac crest, inferior 3 or 4 ribs and inferior angle of scapula	floor of intertubercular groove of humerus	subscapular artery, dorsal scapular artery	thoracodorsal nerve(C6 to C8)	pulls forelimb dorsally and caudally(Extends, medially rotates and adducts humerus)	deltoid, trapezius	2	1
semispinalis thoracis	Torso, Back, right/left	transverse processes of sixth to tenth thoracic vertebrae	spinous processes of upper four thoracic vertebrae and lower two cervical vertebrae		posterior branch of spinal nerve	extends/rotates vertebral column		2	1
semispinalis colli (cervicis)	Torso, Back, right/left	transverse processes of upper five or six thoracic vertebrae	spinous processes, cervical, from axis to fifth		posterior branch of spinal nerve	extends/rotates vertebral column		2	1
semispinalis capitis	Torso/Neck, Back, right/left	articular processes of C4-C6; transverse processes of C7 and T1-T7	spinous process, occipital bone, area between superior nuchal line and inferior nuchal line		greater occipital nerve	extends head		2	1
multifidus lumborum	Torso, Back, right/left	sacrum, erector spinae aponeurosis, PSIS, and iliac crest	spinous process		posterior branch of spinal nerve	stabilizes vertebrae in local movements of vertebral column		2	1
multifidus thoracis	Torso, Back, right/left	sacrum, erector spinae aponeurosis, PSIS, and iliac crest	spinous process		posterior branch of spinal nerve	stabilizes vertebrae in local movements of vertebral column		2	1
multifidus colli	Torso, Back, right/left	sacrum, erector spinae aponeurosis, PSIS, and iliac crest	spinous process		posterior branch of spinal nerve	stabilizes vertebrae in local movements of vertebral column		2	1
rotatores, long 1–11	Torso, Back, thoracis, right/left	transverse process	spinous process	spinous process	posterior branch			22	1
rotatores, short 1–11	Torso, Back, thoracis, right/left	transverse process	spinous process	spinous process	posterior branch			22	1
rotatores lumborum	Torso, Back, right/left	transverse process	spinous process	spinous process	posterior branch			0	1
rotatores colli	Torso, Back, right/left	transverse process	spinous process	spinous process	posterior branch			0	1
interspinales lumborum 1–4	Torso, Back, right/left	spinous process	spinous process		posterior rami of spinal nerves	extends, flexes, and rotates vertebral column		8	1
interspinales thoracis 1–3	Torso, Back, right/left	spinous process	spinous process		posterior rami of spinal nerves	extends, flexes, and rotates vertebral column		6	1
interspinales colli 1–6	Torso, Back, right/left	spinous process	spinous process		posterior rami of spinal nerves	extends, flexes, and rotates vertebral column		12	1
intertransversarii, anterior colli 1–7	Torso, Back, right/left	transverse process	transverse process above		posterior rami of spinal nerves	laterally flexes trunk		14	1
intertransversarii, lateral posterior colli 1–7	Torso, Back, right/left	transverse process	transverse process above		posterior rami of spinal nerves	laterally flexes trunk		14	1
intertransversarii, medial posterior colli 1–7	Torso, Back, right/left	transverse process	transverse process above		posterior rami of spinal nerves	laterally flexes trunk		14	1
intertransversarii, lateral lumborum, dorsal parts 1–5	Torso, Back, right/left	transverse process	transverse process above		posterior rami of spinal nerves	laterally flexes trunk		10	2
intertransversarii, lateral lumborum, ventral parts 1–5	Torso, Back, right/left	transverse process	transverse process above		posterior rami of spinal nerves	laterally flexes trunk		10	2
intertransversarii, medial lumborum 1–5	Torso, Back, right/left	transverse process	transverse process above		posterior rami of spinal nerves	laterally flexes trunk		10	1
intertransversarii, thoracis 1–9	Torso, Back, right/left	transverse process	transverse process above		posterior rami of spinal nerves	laterally flexes trunk		18	1
splenius capitis	Torso/Neck, Back, right/left	nuchal ligament, spinous process of C7-T6	mastoid process of temporal bone, occipital bone	??	C3, C4	extends, rotates, and laterally flexes head		2	1
splenius colli	Torso, Back, right/left	spinous processes of T3-T6	transverse processes of C1, C2, C3		C5, C6			2	1
external intercostal 1–11	Torso, Chest (left/right)	inferior border of rib (above)	superior border of rib (below)	intercostal arteries	intercostal nerves	inhalation	internal	22	1
internal intercostal 1–11	Torso, Chest (left/right)	inferior border of rib (above)	superior border of rib (below)	intercostal arteries	intercostal nerves	holds ribs steady	external	22	1
innermost intercostal 1–11	Torso, Chest	inferior border of rib (above)	superior border of rib (below)	intercostal arteries	intercostal nerves	elevates ribs, expiration		22	1
subcostales 1-n	Torso, Chest	inner surface of one rib	inner surface of second or third rib above, near its angle	intercostal arteries	intercostal nerves			11	1
transversus thoracis	Torso, Chest	costal cartilages of last 3–4 ribs, body of sternum, xiphoid process	ribs/costal cartilages 2–6	intercostal arteries	intercostal nerves	depresses ribs		2	1
levatores costarum, longi 1–4	Torso, Chest	transverse processes of C7 to T12 vertebrae	superior surfaces of ribs immediately inferior to preceding vertebrae		dorsal rami – C8, T1, T2, T3, T4, T5, T6, T7, T8, T9, T10, T11	assists in elevation of thoracic rib cage		8	1
levatores costarum, breves 1–12	Torso, Chest	transverse processes of C7 to T12 vertebrae	superior surfaces of ribs immediately inferior to preceding vertebrae		dorsal rami – C8, T1, T2, T3, T4, T5, T6, T7, T8, T9, T10, T11	assists in elevation of thoracic rib cage		24	1
serratus posterior inferior	Torso, Chest	vertebrae T11 – L3	inferior borders of 9th through 12th ribs	intercostal arteries	intercostal nerves	depresses lower ribs(IX to XII), aiding in expiration		2	1
serratus posterior superior	Torso, Chest	nuchal ligament (or ligamentum nuchae) and spinous processes of vertebrae C7 through T3	upper borders of 2nd through 5th ribs	intercostal arteries	2nd through 5th intercostal nerves	elevates ribs(II to V), aiding in inspiration		2	1
hemidiaphragm, lumbar/costal/sternal part	Torso, Chest, Left/right	septum transversum, pleuroperitoneal folds, inner abdominal wall		pericardiacophrenic artery, musculophrenic artery, inferior phrenic arteries	phrenic and lower intercostal nerves	breathing		2	1
coccygeus	Torso, Pelvis	sacrospinous ligament	coccyx		sacral nerves: S4, S5 or S3-S4	closes back part of pelvic outlet		2	1
iliococcygeus	Torso, Pelvis, Levator ani	ischial spine, posterior part of tendinous arch of pelvic fascia	coccyx and anococcygeal raphe	inferior gluteal artery	levator ani nerve (S4): inferior rectal nerve from pudendal nerve (S3, S4); coccygeal plexus	supports organs in pelvic cavity		2	1
pubococcygeus	Torso, Pelvis, Levator ani	back surface of pubis, anterior part of obturator fascia	coccyx and sacrum	inferior gluteal artery	levator ani nerve (S4): inferior rectal nerve from pudendal nerve (S3, S4); coccygeal plexus	controls urine flow, contracts during orgasm		2	1
puboanalis (puborectalis)	Torso, Pelvis, Levator ani	lower part of pubic symphysis	-	inferior gluteal artery	S3, S4. levator ani nerve	inhibits defecation		2	1
puboperinealis	Torso, Pelvis, Levator ani	?	?	?	?	?	?	2	1
puboprostaticus (males) / pubovaginalis (females)	Torso, Pelvis, Levator ani	?	?	?	?	?	?	2(F)(M)	1
external anal sphincter, subcutaneous, superficial, and deep parts	Torso, Perineum	-	-	inferior rectal artery	S4 and twigs from inferior anal nerves of pudendal nerve	keeps anal canal and anus closed, aids in expulsion of feces	-	1	1
superficial transverse perineal	Torso, Perineum, Superficial perineal pouch	anterior surface of ischial tuberosity	central point of perineum	perineal artery	pudendal nerve	constricts urethra (maintains urinary continence), constricts vagina (women)		2	1
bulbospongiosus	Torso, Perineum, Superficial perineal pouch	perineal raphe	-	perineal artery	pudendal nerve	empties urethra (men), clenches vagina (women)		2	1
ischiocavernosus	Torso, Perineum, Superficial perineal pouch	ischial tuberosity	crus of penis (men), crus of clitoris (women)	perineal artery	pudendal nerve	assists bulbospongiosus		2	1
Deep transverse perineal	Torso, Perineum, Deep perineal pouch	inferior ramus of ischium	its fellow of opposite side		pudendal nerve	constricts urethra (maintains urinary continence), constricts vagina (women)		0-2(M)	1
compressor urethrae	Torso, Perineum, Deep perineal pouch	?	?	?	?	?	?	0-1(F)	1
sphincter urethrovaginalis	Torso, Perineum, Deep perineal pouch	?	?	?	?	?	?	0-1(F)	1
external urethral sphincter	Torso, Perineum, Deep perineal pouch	junction of inferior rami of pubis and ischium about 1.25 – 2 cm, and from neighboring fascia	its fellow of opposite side		perineal branch of pudendal nerve (S2, S3, S4)	constricts urethra, maintains urinary continence		2	1
trapezius, descending part	Upper limb, Vertebral column, Right/Left	down midline, external occipital protuberance, nuchal ligament, medial part of superior nuchal line, spinous processes of vertebrae C7-T12	at shoulders, lateral third of clavicle, acromion of scapula, spine of scapula	transverse cervical artery	motor: accessory nerve [CNXI] sensory: cervical nerves C3 and C4	retracts and assists in rotating scapula(lower fibers depress scapula, upper fibers elevate it and middle fibers adduct )	serratus anterior	2	3
trapezius, transverse part	Upper limb, Vertebral column, Right/Left	down midline, external occipital protuberance, nuchal ligament, medial part of superior nuchal line, spinous processes of vertebrae C7-T12	at shoulders, lateral third of clavicle, acromion of scapula, spine of scapula	transverse cervical artery	motor: accessory nerve [CNXI] sensory: cervical nerves C3 and C4	retracts and elevates scapula	serratus anterior	2	3
trapezius, ascending part	Upper limb, Vertebral column, Right/Left	down midline, external occipital protuberance, nuchal ligament, medial part of superior nuchal line, spinous processes of vertebrae C7-T12	at shoulders, lateral third of clavicle, acromion of scapula, spine of scapula	transverse cervical artery	motor: accessory nerve [CNXI] sensory: cervical nerves C3 and C4	retracts and elevates scapula	serratus anterior	2	3
transversus nuchae	Upper limb, Vertebral column, Right/Left	?	?	?	?	?	?	0	1
rhomboid major	Upper limb, Vertebral column, Right?/Left?	spinous processes of T2 to T5 vertebrae	medial border of scapula, inferior to insertion of rhomboid minor	dorsal scapular artery	dorsal scapular nerve (C4 and C5)	retracts scapula and rotates it to depress glenoid cavity, fixes scapula to thoracic wall	serratus anterior	2	1
rhomboid minor	Upper limb, Vertebral column, Right?/Left?	nuchal ligaments and spinous processes of C7- to T1 vertebrae	medial border of scapula, superior to insertion of rhomboid major	dorsal scapular artery	dorsal scapular nerve (C4 and C5)	retracts (adducts) scapula and rotates it to depress glenoid cavity, fixes scapula to thoracic wall	serratus anterior	2	1
sternalis	Upper limb, Thoracic walls, Right?/Left?	manubrium of sternum or clavicle	xiphoid process, pectoral fascia, lower ribs, costal cartilages or rectus sheath	?	various	?	?	0	1
pectoralis major	Upper limb, Thoracic walls, Right?/Left?	clavicular head: anterior surface of medial half of clavicle sternocostal head: anterior surface of sternum, superior six costal cartilages	intertubercular groove of humerus	pectoral branch of thoracoacromial artery	lateral pectoral nerve, medial pectoral nerve clavicular head: C5 and C6 sternocostal head: C7, C8 and T1	adducts and medially rotates humerus, draws scapula anteriorly and inferiorly clavicular head: flexes humerus sternocostal head: extends humerus		2	1
pectoralis major, abdominal part	Upper limb, Thoracic walls, Right?/Left?	clavicular head: anterior surface of medial half of clavicle sternocostal head: anterior surface of sternum, superior six costal cartilages	intertubercular groove of humerus	pectoral branch of thoracoacromial artery	lateral pectoral nerve, medial pectoral nerve clavicular head: C5 and C6 sternocostal head: C7, C8 and T1	adducts and medially rotates humerus, draws scapula anteriorly and inferiorly clavicular head: flexes humerus sternocostal head: extends humerus		0	0
pectoralis minor	Upper limb, Thoracic walls, Right?/Left?	3rd to 5th ribs, near their costal cartilages	medial border and superior surface of coracoid process of scapula	pectoral branch of thoracoacromial artery	medial pectoral nerve (C8, T1)	stabilizes scapula by drawing it inferiorly and anteriorly against thoracic wall		2	1
subclavius	Upper limb, Thoracic walls, Right?/Left?	first rib	subclavian groove of clavicle	thoracoacromial artery, clavicular branch	subclavian nerve	depresses clavicle		2	1
serratus anterior	Upper limb, Thoracic walls, Right?/Left?	fleshy slips from outer surface of upper 8 or 9 ribs	costal surface of medial margin of scapula	lateral thoracic artery (upper part), thoracodorsal artery (lower part)	long thoracic nerve (from roots of brachial plexus C5, C6, C7)	protracts and stabilises scapula, assists in upward rotation	rhomboid major, rhomboid minor, trapezius	2	1
deltoid, clavicular/acromial/scapular spinal parts	Upper limb, Shoulder, Right/left	clavicle, acromion, spine of scapula	deltoid tuberosity of humerus	primarily posterior circumflex humeral artery	axillary nerve	abducts, flexes, and extends shoulder	latissimus dorsi	2	1
teres major	Upper limb, Shoulder, Right/left	posterior surface of inferior angle of scapula	medial lip of intertubercular sulcus of humerus	subscapular artery, circumflex scapular artery	lower subscapular nerve (segmental levels C5 and C6)	internally rotates humerus		2	1
supraspinatus	Upper limb, Shoulder, rotator cuff, Right/left	supraspinous fossa of scapula	superior facet of greater tubercle of humerus	suprascapular artery	suprascapular nerve	abducts and stabilises humerus	infraspinatus, teres minor, pectoralis major, latissimus dorsi	2	1
infraspinatus	Upper limb, Shoulder, rotator cuff, Right/left	infraspinous fossa of scapula	middle facet of greater tubercle of humerus	suprascapular artery, circumflex scapular artery	suprascapular nerve	laterally rotates, adducts, and stabilises humerus	subscapularis, pectoralis major, latissimus dorsi	2	1
teres minor	Upper limb, Shoulder, rotator cuff, Right/left	lateral border of scapula	inferior facet of greater tubercle of humerus	posterior circumflex humeral artery, circumflex scapular artery	axillary nerve	laterally rotates and adducts humerus	subscapularis, pectoralis major, latissimus dorsi	2	1
subscapularis	Upper limb, Shoulder, rotator cuff, Right/left	subscapular fossa of scapula	lesser tubercle of humerus	subscapular artery	upper subscapular nerve, lower subscapular nerve (C5, C6)	medially rotates humerus, stabilizes shoulder	infraspinatus, teres minor	2	1
coracobrachialis	Upper Limb, Arm, Anterior compartment, right/left	coracoid process of scapula	medial surface of humerus	brachial artery	musculocutaneous nerve	flexes and adducts shoulder		2	1
biceps brachii	Upper Limb, Arm, Anterior compartment, right/left	short head: coracoid process of scapula long head: supraglenoid tubercle	radial tuberosity, bicipital aponeurosis	brachial artery	musculocutaneous nerve (lateral cord: C5, C6, C7)	flexes elbow, supinates forearm	triceps brachii	2	1
brachialis	Upper Limb, Arm, Anterior compartment, right/left	anterior surface of humerus (mainly distal half)	coronoid process of ulna, tuberosity of ulna	radial recurrent artery	musculocutaneous nerve	flexes elbow	triceps brachii	2	1
triceps brachii	Upper Limb, Arm, Posterior compartment, right/left	long head: infraglenoid tubercle of scapula lateral head: posterior humerus (above radial sulcus) medial head: posterior humerus - (below radial sulcus)	olecranon of ulna	deep artery of arm	radial nerve	extends forearm, adducts shoulder (long head). medial head does not function at shoulder.	biceps brachii, brachialis	2	1
articularis cubiti	Upper Limb, Arm, Posterior compartment, right/left	deep distal surface of medial head of triceps	posterior capsule of elbow joint	deep artery of arm	radial nerve	lifts capsule away from joint	?	2	1
anconeus	Upper Limb, Arm, Posterior compartment, right/left	lateral epicondyle of humerus	lateral surface of olecranon, superior part of posterior ulna	deep artery of arm, interosseous recurrent artery	radial nerve (C7, C8, and T1)	partly blended with triceps, extends forearm, stabilises elbow, abducts ulna during pronation		2	1
pronator teres	Upper limb, Forearm, Anterior compartment, Superficial, Right/left	humeral head: medial epicondyle of humerus (common flexor tendon) ulnar head: coronoid process of ulna	pronator tuberosity of radius	ulnar artery, radial artery	median nerve	pronates forearm, flexes elbow	supinator	2	1
flexor carpi radialis	Upper limb, Forearm, Anterior compartment, Superficial, Right/left	medial epicondyle of humerus (common flexor tendon)	bases of second metacarpal, base of third metacarpal	radial artery	median nerve	flexes and abducts wrist	extensor carpi radialis brevis, extensor carpi radialis longus	2	1
palmaris longus	Upper limb, Forearm, Anterior compartment, Superficial, Right/left	medial epicondyle of humerus (common flexor tendon)	palmar aponeurosis	ulnar artery	median nerve	flexes wrist	extensor carpi radialis brevis, extensor carpi radialis longus, extensor carpi ulnaris	2	1
flexor carpi ulnaris	Upper limb, Forearm, Anterior compartment, Superficial, Right/left	medial epicondyle of humerus (common flexor tendon)	pisiform, hook of hamate, base of fifth metacarpal	ulnar artery	muscular branches of ulnar nerve	flexes and adducts wrist	extensor carpi ulnaris	2	1
flexor digitorum superficialis	Upper limb, Forearm, Anterior compartment, Superficial, Right/left	medial epicondyle of humerus (common flexor tendon), parts of radius and ulna	bases of middle phalanges 2, 3, 4, and 5	ulnar artery	median nerve	flexes fingers (primarily at proximal interphalangeal joints)	extensor digitorum	2	1
pronator quadratus	Upper limb, Forearm, Anterior compartment, Deep, Right/left	medial anterior surface of ulna	lateral anterior surface of radius	anterior interosseous artery	anterior interosseous nerve (median nerve)	weakly pronates forearm	supinator	2	1
flexor digitorum profundus	Upper limb, Forearm, Anterior compartment, Deep, Right/left	ulna	distal phalanges	anterior interosseous artery	lateral belly: anterior interosseous nerve (median nerve) medial belly: muscular branches of ulnar nerve	flexes wrist, flexes interphalangeal joints	extensor digitorum	2	1
flexor pollicis longus	Upper limb, Forearm, Anterior compartment, Deep, Right/left	middle half of volar surface of radius, interosseus membrane	base of distal phalanx of thumb	anterior interosseous artery	anterior interosseous nerve (median nerve) (C8, T1)	flexes thumb	extensor pollicis longus, extensor pollicis brevis	2	1
extensor digitorum	Upper limb, Forearm, Posterior compartment, Superficial, Right/left	lateral epicondyle of humerus (common extensor tendon)	2nd–5th phalanges	posterior interosseous artery	posterior interosseous nerve (C7, C8)	extends hand, extends fingers	flexor digitorum superficialis, flexor digitorum profundus	2	1
extensor digiti minimi	Upper limb, Forearm, Posterior compartment, Superficial, Right/left	anterior surface of lateral epicondyle of humerus (common extensor tendon)	extensor expansion, located at base of proximal phalanx on dorsal side	posterior interosseous artery	posterior interosseous nerve (C7, C8)	extends little finger at all joints	flexor digiti minimi brevis (hand)	2	1
extensor carpi ulnaris	Upper limb, Forearm, Posterior compartment, Superficial, Right/left	lateral epicondyle of humerus (common extensor tendon), ulna	5th metacarpal	ulnar artery	posterior interosseous nerve (C7, C8)	extends and adducts wrist	flexor carpi ulnaris	2	1
brachioradialis	Upper limb, Forearm, mobile wad, Right/left	lateral supracondylar ridge of humerus	radial styloid process (distal radius)	radial recurrent artery	radial nerve	flexes forearm, pronates forearm when supine, supinates forearm when prone		2	1
extensor carpi radialis longus	Upper limb, Forearm, mobile wad, Right/left	lateral supracondylar ridge of humerus	2nd metacarpal	radial artery	radial nerve	extends wrist joint, abducts hand at wrist	flexor carpi radialis	2	1
extensor carpi radialis brevis	Upper limb, Forearm, mobile wad, Right/left	anterior surface of lateral epicondyle of humerus (common extensor tendon)	base of 3rd metacarpal	radial artery	posterior interosseus nerve	extends wrist joint, abducts hand at wrist	flexor carpi radialis	2	1
supinator	Upper limb, Forearm, Posterior compartment, Deep, Right/left	lateral epicondyle of humerus, supinator crest of ulna, radial collateral ligament, annular ligament	lateral proximal shaft of radius	radial recurrent artery	posterior interosseus nerve (C7, C8)	supinates forearm	pronator teres, pronator quadratus	2	1
extensor indicis	Upper limb, Forearm, Posterior compartment, Deep, Right/left	ulna	index finger (extensor hood)		posterior interosseous nerve (C7, C8)	extends index finger, wrist		2	1
abductor pollicis longus	Upper limb, Forearm, anatomical snuffbox, Right/left	ulna	first metacarpal	posterior interosseous artery	posterior interosseous nerve (C7, C8)	abducts and extends thumb	adductor pollicis	2	1
extensor pollicis brevis	Upper limb, Forearm, anatomical snuffbox, Right/left	radius, interosseous membrane of forearm	proximal phalanx of thumb	posterior interosseous artery	posterior interosseous nerve (C7, C8)	extends thumb at metacarpophalangeal joint	flexor pollicis longus, flexor pollicis brevis	2	1
extensor pollicis longus	Upper limb, Forearm, anatomical snuffbox, Right/left	ulna, interosseous membrane of forearm	distal phalanx of thumb	posterior interosseous artery	posterior interosseous nerve (C7, C8)	extends thumb (metacarpophalangeal and interphalangeal)	flexor pollicis longus, flexor pollicis brevis	2	1
opponens pollicis	Upper limb, Hand, Lateral volar, Thenar	trapezium, transverse carpal ligament	metacarpal bone of thumb on its radial side	superficial palmar arch	median nerve	opposes thumb		2	1
flexor pollicis brevis	Upper limb, Hand, Lateral volar, Thenar	trapezoid, flexor retinaculum	thumb, proximal phalanx	superficial palmar arch	median nerve, deep branch of ulnar nerve (medial head)	flexes thumb	extensor pollicis longus, extensor pollicis brevis	2	1
abductor pollicis brevis	Upper limb, Hand, Lateral volar, Thenar	flexor retinaculum of hand, scaphoid and trapezium	radial base of proximal phalanx of thumb and thumb extensors	superficial palmar arch	median nerve	abducts thumb	adductor pollicis	2	1
adductor pollicis	Upper limb, Hand, Lateral volar, Thenar	transverse head: anterior body of third metacarpal oblique head: bases of second and third metacarpals and adjacent trapezoid and capitate bones	medial side of base of proximal phalanx of thumb and ulnar sesamoid	deep palmar arch	deep branch of ulnar nerve (T1)	adducts thumb at carpometacarpal joint	abductor pollicis longus, abductor pollicis brevis	2	1
palmaris brevis	Upper limb, Hand, Medial volar	flexor retinaculum (medial), palmar aponeurosis	palm	palmar metacarpal artery	superficial branch of ulnar nerve	wrinkle skin of palm		2	1
abductor digiti minimi (hand)	Upper limb, Hand, Medial volar, hypothenar	pisiform	base of proximal phalanx of 5th digit on ulnar or medial side	ulnar artery	deep branch of ulnar nerve	abducts little finger		2	1
flexor digiti minimi (hand)	Upper limb, Hand, Medial volar, hypothenar	hamate bone	little finger	ulnar artery	deep branch of ulnar nerve	flexes little finger	extensor digiti minimi	2	1
opponens digiti minimi (hand)	Upper limb, Hand, Medial volar, hypothenar	hook of hamate, flexor retinaculum	medial border of 5th metacarpal	ulnar artery	deep branch of ulnar nerve (C8 and T1)	draws 5th metacarpal anteriorly and rotates it, bringing little finger (5th digit) into opposition with thumb		2	1
lumbricals of the hand 1–4	Upper limb, Hand, Intermediate	flexor digitorum profundus	extensor expansion	superficial palmar arch, common palmar digital arteries, deep palmar arch, dorsal digital artery	deep branch of ulnar nerve, median nerve	flex metacarpophalangeal joints, extend interphalangeal joints		8	1
dorsal interossei (hand) 1–4	Upper limb, Hand, Intermediate	metacarpals	proximal phalanges	dorsal metacarpal artery, palmar metacarpal artery	deep branch of ulnar nerve	abduct fingers	palmar interossei	8	1
palmar interossei 1–3	Upper limb, Hand, Intermediate	metacarpals	proximal phalanges	palmar metacarpal artery	deep branch of ulnar nerve	adduct fingers	dorsal interossei	6	1
pollical palmar interosseus	Upper limb, Hand, Intermediate	metacarpals	proximal phalanges	palmar metacarpal artery	deep branch of ulnar nerve	adduct fingers	dorsal interossei	1.6	1
psoas major	Lower Limb, Iliac region, iliopsoas	transverse processes, bodies and intervertebral discs of T12-L5 vertebrae	lesser trochanter of femur	iliolumbar artery	lumbar plexus via anterior branches of L1, L2, L3	flexes and rotates laterally thigh	gluteus maximus	2	1
psoas minor	Lower Limb, Iliac region, iliopsoas	side of T11+L1 and IV intervertebral disc	Pectineal line and iliopectineal eminence	iliolumbar artery, lumbar arteries	L1	weakly flexes trunk flexor	gluteus maximus	0.8	1
iliacus	Lower Limb, Iliac region, iliopsoas	iliac fossa	lesser trochanter of femur	medial femoral circumflex artery, Iliolumbar artery	femoral nerve (L2, L3)	flexes hip	gluteus maximus	2	1
tensor fasciae latae	Lower limb, Gluteal, Left/right	iliac crest	iliotibial tract	primarily lateral circumflex femoral artery, superior gluteal artery	superior gluteal nerve (L4, L5)	flexes thigh, medially rotates thigh, stabilises torso		2	1
gluteus maximus	Lower limb, gluteal, Left/right	gluteal surface of ilium, lumbar fascia, sacrum, sacrotuberous ligament	gluteal tuberosity of femur, iliotibial tract	superior gluteal artery, inferior gluteal artery	inferior gluteal nerve (L5, S1, S2 nerve roots)	externally rotates and extends hip joint, supports extended knee through iliotibial tract, chief antigravity muscle in sitting	Iliacus, psoas major, psoas minor	2	1
gluteus medius	Lower limb, gluteal, Left/right	gluteal surface of ilium, under gluteus maximus	greater trochanter of femur	superior gluteal artery	superior gluteal nerve (L4, L5, S1 nerve roots)	abduction of hip; preventing adduction of hip Medial rotation of thigh	lateral rotator group	2	1
gluteus minimus	Lower limb, gluteal, Left/right	gluteal surface of ilium, under gluteus medius	greater trochanter of femur	superior gluteal artery	superior gluteal nerve (L4, L5, S1 nerve roots)	abduction of hip; preventing adduction of hip Medial rotation of thigh	lateral rotator group	2	1
piriformis	Lower limb, gluteal, lateral rotator group, Left/right	sacrum	greater trochanter	inferior gluteal artery, lateral sacral artery, superior gluteal artery	piriformis nerve (S1 and S2 nerve roots)	laterally rotates (outward) thigh		2	1
obturator externus	Lower limb, gluteal, lateral rotator group, Left/right	obturator foramen and obturatory membrane	medial surface of greater trochanter of femur	obturator artery	posterior branch of obturator nerve (L3, L4)	adduct thigh, rotate laterally thigh		2	1
superior gemellus	Lower limb, gluteal, lateral rotator group, Left/right	ischial spine			nerve to obturator internus (L5, S1, S2)			2	1
obturator internus	Lower limb, gluteal, lateral rotator group, Left/right	ischiopubic ramus, obturator membrane	medial surface of greater trochanter of femur		nerve to obturator internus (L5, S1, S2)	abducts & rotates laterally thigh, stabilises hip during walking		2	1
inferior gemellus	Lower limb, gluteal, lateral rotator group, Left/right	ischial tuberosity	obturator internus tendon		nerve to quadratus femoris (L4, L5, S1)	laterally rotates thigh		2	1
quadratus femoris	Lower limb, gluteal, lateral rotator group, Left/right	ischial tuberosity	intertrochanteric crest	inferior gluteal artery	nerve to quadratus femoris (L4, L5, S1)			2	1
articularis genus	Lower limb, Thigh, Anterior compartment	femur	suprapatellar bursa	femoral artery	femoral nerve	pulls suprapatellar bursa during extension of knee		2	1
sartorius	Lower limb, Thigh, Anterior compartment	superior to anterior superior iliac spine	medial side of upper tibia in pes anserinus	femoral artery	femoral nerve	flexes, laterally rotates, and abducts thigh, flexes and medially rotates leg		2	1
rectus femoris	Lower limb, Thigh, Anterior compartment	anterior inferior iliac spine and exterior surface of bony ridge which forms iliac portion of acetabulum	patella and tibial tuberosity via patellar tendon	femoral artery	femoral nerve	knee extension; hip flexion	hamstring	2	1
vastus lateralis	Lower limb, Thigh, Anterior compartment	greater trochanter, intertrochanteric line, and linea aspera of femur	patella and tibial tuberosity via patellar tendon	femoral artery	femoral nerve	extends knee	hamstring	2	1
vastus intermedius	Lower limb, Thigh, Anterior compartment	anterior surface of femur	patella and tibial tuberosity via patellar tendon	femoral artery	femoral nerve	extends knee	hamstring	2	1
vastus medialis	Lower limb, Thigh, Anterior compartment	anteromedial surface of femur	patella and tibial tuberosity via patellar tendon	femoral artery	femoral nerve	extends knee	hamstring	2	1
biceps femoris	Lower limb, Thigh, Posterior compartment/hamstring	ischial tuberosity (long head), linea aspera of femur (short head)	head of fibula articulating with back of lateral tibial condyle	inferior gluteal artery, perforating arteries, popliteal artery	medial (tibial) part of sciatic nerve (long head), lateral (common fibular) part of sciatic nerve (short head)	flexes knee joint, laterally rotates leg at knee (when knee is flexed), extends hip joint (long head only)	quadriceps femoris	2	1
semitendinosus	Lower limb, Thigh, Posterior compartment/hamstring	ischial tuberosity	pes anserinus	inferior gluteal artery, perforating arteries	sciatic nerve (tibial, L5, S1, S2)	flexes knee, extends hip, medially rotates leg at knee	quadriceps femoris	2	1
semimembranosus	Lower limb, Thigh, Posterior compartment/hamstring	ischial tuberosity	medial surface of tibia	profunda femoris, gluteal artery	sciatic nerve	flexes knee, extends hip, medially rotates leg at knee	quadriceps femoris	2	1
gracilis	Lower limb, Thigh/Hip, Medial compartment (adductor muscles)	inferior pubic ramus	tibia (pes anserinus)	obturator artery	anterior branch of obturator nerve	adducts hip, flexes hip, medially rotates knee	gluteus medius, gluteus minimus	2	1
pectineus	Lower limb, Thigh/Hip, Medial compartment (adductor muscles)	superior pubic ramus	lesser trochanter, linea aspera	obturator artery	femoral nerve and obturator nerve (medial compartment)	adducts and flexes hip	gluteus medius, gluteus minimus	2	1
adductor brevis	Lower limb, Thigh/Hip, Medial compartment (adductor muscles)	anterior surface of inferior pubic ramus	lesser trochanter and linea aspera of femur	obturator artery	anterior branch of obturator nerve	adducts hip	gluteus medius, gluteus minimus	2	1
adductor longus	Lower limb, Thigh/Hip, Medial compartment (adductor muscles)	pubic body just below pubic crest	middle third of linea aspera	obturator artery	anterior branch of obturator nerve	adducts and medially rotates hip	gluteus medius, gluteus minimus	2	1
adductor magnus, adductor part	Lower limb, Thigh/Hip, Medial compartment (adductor muscles)	pubis	femur, adductor tubercle of femur	obturator artery	posterior branch of obturator nerve (adductor) and tibial part of sciatic nerve (vertical head)	adducts hip	gluteus medius, gluteus minimus	2	3
adductor minimus	Lower limb, Thigh/Hip, Medial compartment (adductor muscles), part of adductor magnus	Inferior ramus	Linea aspera of the femur	Obturator artery and the medial circumflex femoral artery of the femoral artery.	Obturator and tibial nerves	Adduction and lateral rotation of thigh	gluteus medius, gluteus minimus	2	3
adductor magnus, ischiocondylar part	Lower limb, Thigh/Hip, Medial compartment (adductor muscles)	pubis	femur, adductor tubercle of femur	obturator artery	posterior branch of obturator nerve (adductor) and tibial part of sciatic nerve (vertical head)	adducts hip	gluteus medius, gluteus minimus	2	3
tibialis anterior	Lower limb, Leg, Anterior Compartment	body of tibia	medial cuneiform and first metatarsal bones of foot	anterior tibial artery	deep fibular nerve	dorsiflexes and inverts foot	fibularis longus, gastrocnemius, soleus, plantaris, tibialis posterior	2	1
extensor hallucis longus	Lower limb, Leg, Anterior Compartment	middle portion of anterior surface of fibula, anterior surface of interosseous membrane	dorsal side of base of distal phalanx of hallux	anterior tibial artery	deep fibular nerve	extends big toe, assists in dorsiflexion of foot at ankle, weakly inverts foot	flexor hallucis longus, flexor hallucis brevis	2	1
extensor digitorum longus	Lower limb, Leg, Anterior Compartment	lateral condyle of tibia, superior ¾ of interosseous membrane	middle and distal phalanges of lateral four digits	anterior tibial artery	deep fibular nerve	extension of toes and ankle	flexor digitorum longus, flexor digitorum brevis	2	1
fibularis tertius	Lower limb, Leg, Anterior Compartment	distal anterior surface of fibula	dorsal surface of fifth metatarsal	anterior tibial artery	deep fibular nerve	dorsi flexes and everts foot		2	1
gastrocnemius	Lower Limb, Leg, Calf	medial condyle and lateral condyle of femur	calcaneus	sural arteries	tibial nerve from sciatic nerve, specifically, nerve roots S1, S2	plantarflexes ankle, flexes knee (minor)	tibialis anterior	2	1
soleus	Lower Limb, Leg, Calf	fibula, medial border of tibia (soleal line)	tendo calcaneus	sural arteries	tibial nerve, specifically, nerve roots L_{5}–S_{2}	plantarflexes ankle	tibialis anterior	2	1
plantaris	Lower Limb, Leg, Posterior compartment, Superficial	lateral supracondylar ridge of femur above lateral head of gastrocnemius	calcaneal tendon (medial side, deep to gastrocnemius tendon)	sural arteries	tibial nerve	plantarflexes ankle, flexes knee	tibialis anterior	2	1
popliteus	Lower Limb, Leg, Posterior compartment, Deep	middle facet of lateral surface of lateral femoral condyle	posterior tibia under tibial condyles	popliteal artery	tibial nerve	medially rotates and flexes knee		2	1
flexor hallucis longus	Lower Limb, Leg, Posterior compartment, Deep, tarsal tunnel	posterior surface of upper 1/3 of fibula	base of distal phalanx of hallux	fibular artery (peroneal branch of posterior tibial artery	tibial nerve, S1, S2 nerve roots	flexes all joints of big toe, plantarflexes ankle	extensor hallucis longus	2	1
flexor digitorum longus	Lower Limb, Leg, Posterior compartment, Deep, tarsal tunnel	medial tibia	distal phalanges of lateral four digits	posterior tibial artery	tibial nerve	flexes toes	extensor digitorum longus, extensor digitorum brevis	2	1
tibialis posterior	Lower Limb, Leg, Posterior compartment, Deep, tarsal tunnel	tibia, fibula	navicular, medial cuneiform	posterior tibial artery	tibial nerve	inverts foot, plantarflexes foot at ankle	tibialis anterior	2	1
fibularis longus	Lower Limb, Leg, Lateral compartment	fibula	first metatarsal, medial cuneiform	fibular artery	superficial fibular nerve	plantarflexes and everts ankle	tibialis anterior	2	1
fibularis brevis	Lower Limb, Leg, Lateral compartment	fibula	fifth metatarsal	fibular artery	superficial fibular nerve	plantarflexes and everts ankle	tibialis posterior	2	1
extensor digitorum brevis	Lower limb, Foot, Dorsal, left/right	calcaneus	toes		deep fibular nerve	extends digits 2, 3, and 4	flexor digitorum longus, flexor digitorum brevis	2	1
extensor hallucis brevis	Lower limb, Foot, Dorsal, left/right	calcaneus	base of proximal phalanx of big toe		deep fibular nerve	extends big toe	flexor hallucis brevis	2	1
dorsal interossei (foot) 1–4	Lower limb, Foot, Dorsal / Fourth layer, left/right	metatarsals	proximal phalanges		lateral plantar nerve(fourth interosseous space: superficial branch others: deep branch), first and second interossei: lateral branch of deep fibular nerve	abducts toes	plantar interossei	8	1
abductor hallucis	Lower limb, plantar, first layer, left/right	medial process of calcaneus, flexor retinaculum, plantar aponeurosis	medial side of base of proximal phalanx of first digit		medial plantar nerve	abducts hallux	adductor hallucis	2	1
flexor digitorum brevis	Lower limb, plantar, first layer, left/right	medial process of calcaneus, plantar aponeurosis, intermuscular septa	middle phalanges of digits 2–5		medial plantar nerve	flexes lateral four toes	extensor digitorum longus, extensor digitorum brevis	2	1
abductor digiti minimi (foot)	Lower limb, plantar, first layer, left/right	plantar aponeurosis	phalanges of fifth toe	lateral plantar artery	lateral plantar nerve (S1, S2)	flexes and abducts fifth toe	flexor digiti minimi brevis (foot)	2	1
Abductor of fifth metatarsal abductor ossis metatarsi quinti (foot)	Lower limb, plantar, first layer, left/right	calcaneus	fifth toe	lateral plantar artery	lateral plantar nerve (S1, S2)	abducts fifth toe	flexor digiti minimi brevis (foot)	0	1
quadratus plantae	Lower limb, plantar, second layer, left/right	calcaneus	tendons of flexor digitorum longus		lateral plantar nerve (S1, S2)	flexes distal interphalangeal joints (assists flexor digitorum longus)		2	1
lumbricals of the foot 1–4	Lower limb, plantar, second layer, left/right	tendons of flexor digitorum longus	medial surface of extensor expansion of proximal phalanges of lateral four toes	lateral plantar artery, plantar arch, four plantar metatarsal arteries	lateral plantar nerve (lateral three lumbricals) and medial plantar nerve (first lumbrical)	maintain extension of digits at interphalangeal joints		8	1
flexor hallucis brevis	Lower limb, plantar, Third layer, left/right	plantar surface of cuneiforms, plantar calcaneocuboid ligament, long plantar ligament	medial head: medial sesamoid bone of metatarsophalangeal joint, proximal phalanx of great toe lateral head: lateral sesamoid bone of metatarsophalangeal joint, proximal phalanx of great toe		medial plantar nerve	flexes big toe	extensor hallucis longus	2	1
adductor hallucis	Lower limb, plantar, Third layer, left/right	oblique head: proximal ends of middle 3 metatarsals transverse head: metatarsophalangeal joints, ligaments of lateral 3 toes	lateral side of base of proximal phalanx of big toe, sesamoid		lateral plantar nerve	adducts big toe	abductor hallucis	2	1
flexor digiti minimi brevis (foot)	Lower limb, plantar, Third layer, left/right	fifth metatarsal bone	phalanx of fifth toe		lateral plantar nerve (superficial branch)	extends and adducts fifth toe	abductor digiti minimi	2	1
opponens digiti minimi muscle of foot (opponens digiti quinti)	Lower limb, plantar, first layer, left/right	?	middle phalanges of digit 5		?	?	?	0	1
plantar interossei 1–3	Lower limb, plantar, Fourth layer, left/right	tendons of plantar Interossei	proximal phalanges III-V - muscles cross the metatarsophalangeal joint of toes III-V so the insertions correspond with the origin and there is no crossing between toes	plantar arch, dorsal metatarsal artery	lateral plantar nerve	adducts toes 3 - 5, strengthens transverse arch	dorsal interossei	6	1

== Table explanation and summary ==
The muscles are described using anatomical terminology. The columns are as follows:

Name	Explanation
Muscle	US English (Note: The UK English names differ mainly by the addition of dashes, which are less common in practice.) name of the muscle per Terminologia Anatomica (TA), minus the term "muscle", with the words reordered occasionally for better sorting. Parts and bellies are listed out as separate rows, as they are sometimes considered separate muscles. - Anything denoting the muscles relationship to another muscle such as e.g. superior, inferior etc. should always be used as a suffix and not a prefix, to create better sortability of the list.
Location	The location of the muscle in a standard human body. The location first specifies a group such as head, neck, torso, upper limbs, or lower limbs, then may have more specific information. However this additional information must be describing location not function.
Origin	The bone or other structure the muscle is attached to that remains immobile during the action. The term "bone" is omitted from bone names.
Insertion	The attachment point of the muscle, on a bone or otherwise, that moves during the action.
Artery	The artery which supplies the muscle with blood. The term "artery" is included to avoid confusing columns.
Nerve	The nerve(s) which tell the muscle to act (innervates the muscle). The term "nerve" is included for clarity.
Action	The movement performed by the muscle from the standard anatomical position. In other positions, other actions may be performed.
Antagonist	The muscle which can 'cancel' or to some degree reverse the action of the muscle. Muscle synergies are noted in parentheses when relevant.
O (Occurrences)	Number of times that the named muscle row occurs in a standard human body. Here it may also be denoted when a given muscles only occurs in a male or a female body. By (F) for female and (M) for male, if nothing is denoted. The muscle can be assumed to occur in both genders. This gender denomination should always be behind the number, not in front of it.
TA	The number of rows in the table for the relevant Terminologia Anatomica muscle. For example, TA splits the nasalis muscle into transverse and alar parts, so their TA column entries are 2.

For Origin, Insertion and Action please name a specific Rib, Thoracic vertebrae or Cervical vertebrae, by using C1-7, T1-12 or R1-12.

=== Summary in numbers ===
There does not appear to be a definitive source counting all skeletal muscles. Different sources group muscles differently, regarding physical features as different parts of a single muscle or as several muscles. There are also vestigial muscles that are present in some people but absent in others, such as the palmaris longus muscle. There are between 600 and 840 muscles within the typical human body, depending on how they are counted. In the present table, using statistical counts of the instances of each muscle, and ignoring gender-specific muscles, there are 753 skeletal muscles. Sometimes male and females have the same muscle but with different purposes

==== Numbers based on the list above ====
	Total number
Total number of entries in Terminologia Anatomica represented in table	337
Total rows of table (combining TA2 entries)	289
Types of vestigial muscles listed, which do not always appear in a standard male or female human	12
Non gender specific skeletal muscles - listed names (combining parts)	249
Gender specific skeletal muscles - listed names	6
Non gender specific skeletal muscles - average occurrences (combining parts)	753
Gender specific skeletal muscles - average occurrences (50% male)	4.5
Total number of skeletal muscles represented in table (average)	759.5

=== Agonistic and antagonistic relationships ===
Muscles are often paired as agonistic and antagonistic muscles. This can be a bit misleading as, in general, it is groups of muscles working together to either make or cancel a movement. The present table lists some well-known relationships but is not at all complete.

== Innervation overview ==
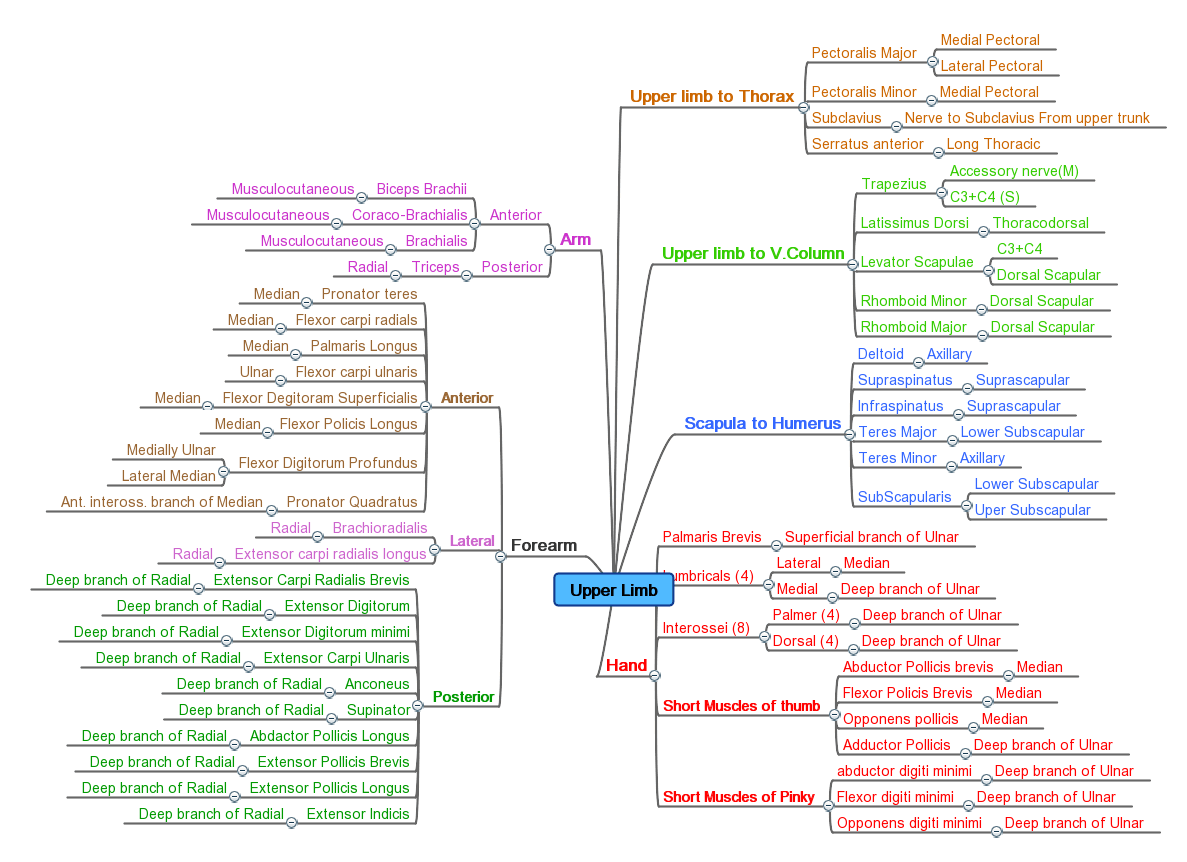
Mind map showing a summary of upper limb muscle innervation
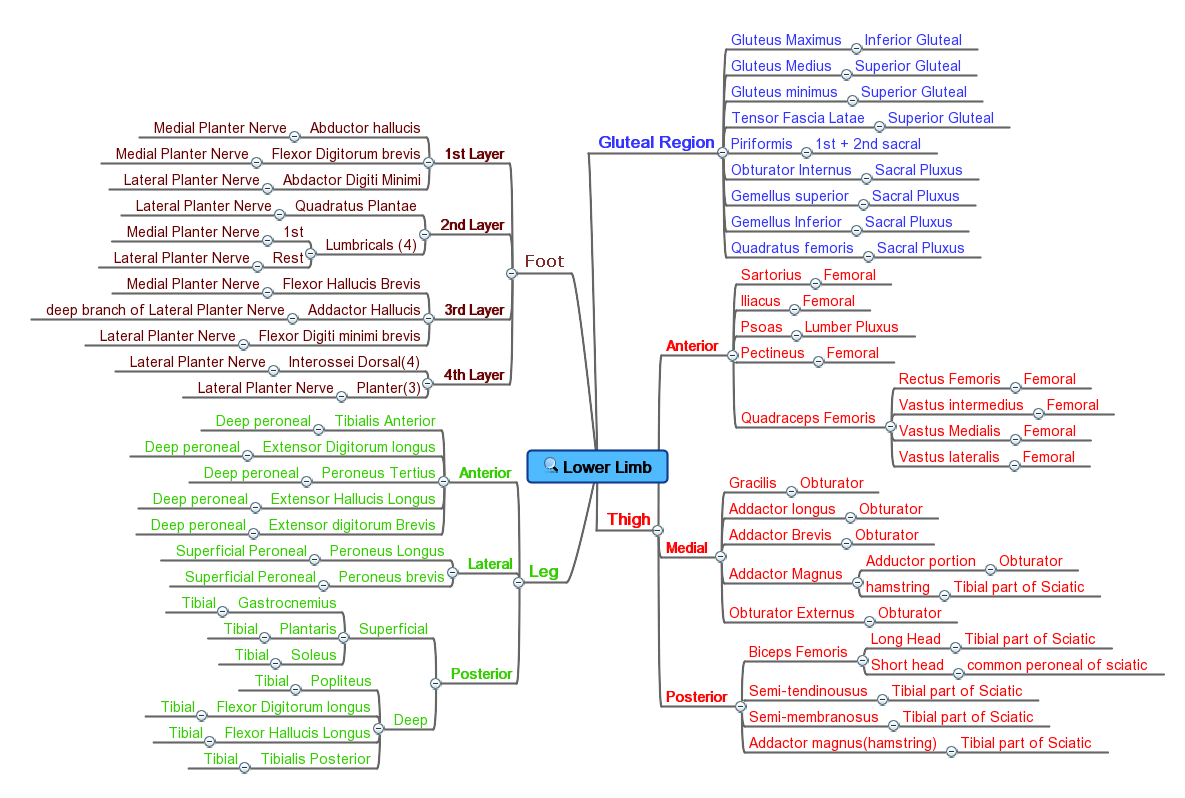
Mind map showing a summary of lower limb muscle innervation

== See also ==
- Accessory muscle
- List of bones of the human skeleton
- List of nerves of the human body
- Circulatory system
- Blood vessel

== General references ==
- Gosling, J.A.; Harris, P.F.; Humpherson, J.R.; Whitmore, I.; Willan, P.L.T. (2008). Human Anatomy: Color Atlas and Textbook. phot. by A.L. Bentley (5th ed.). Philadelphia: Mosby. ISBN 978-0-7234-3451-1.
