= Tragicus =

Outer ear muscle

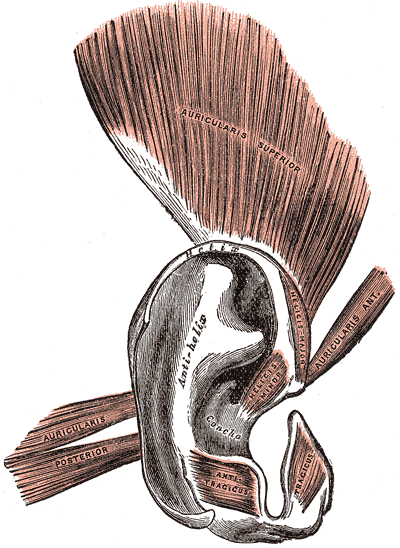
- The muscles of the auricula. (Tragicus visible at bottom right.)

Details
- Origin: Base of the tragus
- Insertion: Apex of the tragus
- Artery: Auricular branches of posterior auricular and auricular branch of occipital arteries
- Nerve: Facial nerve
- Actions: Increase the opening of the external acoustic meatus

Identifiers
- Latin: musculus tragicus
- TA98: A15.3.01.039
- TA2: 2095
- FMA: 48974

The tragicus, also called the tragus muscle or Valsalva muscle, is an intrinsic muscle of the outer ear.

It is a short, flattened vertical band on the lateral surface of the tragus.

While the muscle modifies the auricular shape only minimally in the majority of individuals, this action could increase the opening of the external acoustic meatus in some.

== Additional images ==
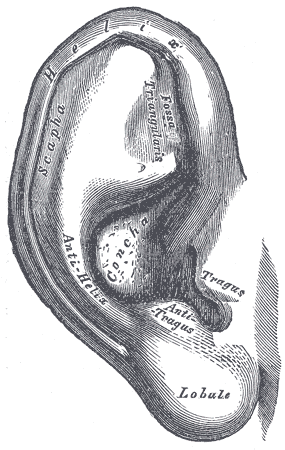
Anatomy of human ear

== See also ==
- Intrinsic muscles of external ear
