= Transverse muscle of auricle =

Muscle of the outer ear

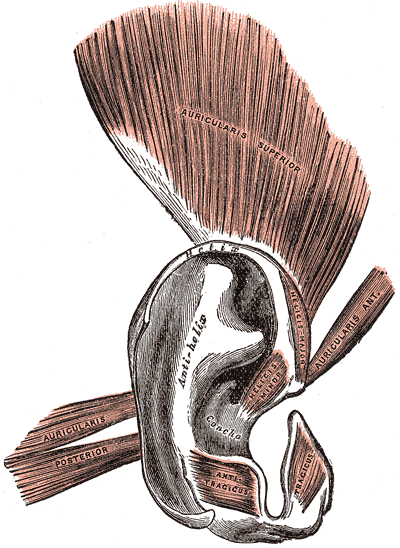
- The muscles of the outer ear.

Details
- Origin: Cranial surface of the eminentia conchae
- Insertion: Cranial surface of the eminentia scaphae
- Artery: Auricular branches of posterior auricular and auricular branch of occipital arteries
- Nerve: Facial nerve
- Actions: Flattens the cranial profile outer ear

Identifiers
- Latin: musculus transversus auriculae
- TA98: A15.3.01.043
- TA2: 2099
- FMA: 48983

The transverse muscle of auricle (transverse auricular muscle, transversus auriculae, transversus auricularis or transverse muscle of pinna) is an intrinsic muscle of the outer ear.

The muscle is located on the cranial surface of the pinna. It consists of scattered fibers, partly tendinous and partly muscular, extending from the eminentia conchae to the prominence corresponding with the scapha.

While the muscle modifies the auricular shape only minimally in the majority of individuals, it could help flatten the cranial profile of the auricular cartilage.

The transverse muscle is developmentally derived from the second pharyngeal arch.

== Additional images ==
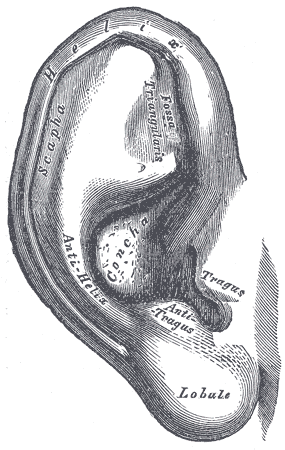
Anatomy of human ear

== See also ==
- Intrinsic muscles of external ear
