= Antitragicus =

Muscle of the outer ear

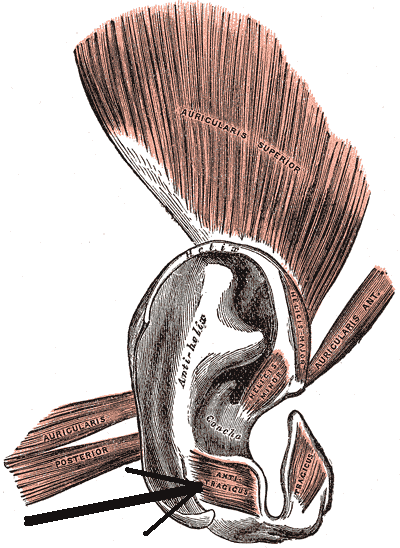
- The muscles of the ear (antitragicus visible at bottom center).

Details
- Origin: Outer part of the antitragus
- Insertion: Cauda helicis and antihelix
- Artery: Auricular branch of superficial temporal and auricular branches of posterior auricular artery
- Nerve: Facial nerve
- Actions: Modifies the auricular shape

Identifiers
- Latin: musculus antitragicus
- TA98: A15.3.01.042
- TA2: 2098
- FMA: 48980

The antitragicus is an intrinsic muscle of the outer ear.

In human anatomy, the antitragicus arises from the outer part of the antitragus, and is inserted into the cauda helicis (or tail of the helix) and antihelix.

The function of the muscle is to adjust the shape of the ear by pulling the antitragus and cauda helicis towards each other. While the muscle modifies the auricular shape only minimally in the majority of individuals, this action could increase the opening into the external acoustic meatus in some.

The helicis minor is developmentally derived from the second pharyngeal arch.

== Additional images ==
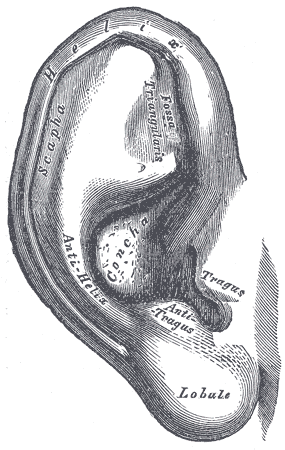
Anatomy of human ear

== See also ==
- Intrinsic muscles of external ear
