= Nerve to levator ani =

Pelvic motor nerve

Identifiers
- TA2: 6552
- FMA: 66048

The levator ani nerve is a nerve to the levator ani muscles. It originates from sacral spinal nerve 4.
