= Pterygoideus proprius =

Anomalous anatomical variant of the infratemporal fossa

Details
- Origin: Infratemporal crest of the sphenoid bone
- Insertion: Lateral pterygoid plate of the sphenoid bone
- Artery: ?
- Nerve: ?
- Actions: None confirmed
- Antagonist: None

Identifiers
- Latin: Musculus pterygoideus proprius
- TA2: 2112

The pterygoideus proprius muscle (from Latin "pterygoid's own muscle") is an anomalous anatomical variant of the infratemporal fossa. The attachments of the muscle influenced the terminology for the Latin name, as the muscle attaches back onto the same sphenoid bone. The muscle has been described for over 160 years, such as a musculotendinous structure. This muscle was first described by German anatomist Friedrich Gustav Jakob Henle during 1858. Initially, the muscle was described as being a vertically oriented fibrous band attaching at the infratemporal crest of the sphenoid to the lateral pterygoid plate. The muscle is present in non-human primates rarely with similar anatomical results.

== Structure ==
The muscle runs vertically (originates) from the infratemporal crest of the greater wing of the sphenoid bone, and inserts at lateral pterygoid plate of the sphenoid bone or the pyramidal process of the palatine bone. The muscle fibres frequently blend with the lateral and medial pterygoid muscle fibres. Nerve supply is variable in its presence, though sometimes supplied from anterior deep temporal nerves. This muscle is superficial to the lateral pterygoid muscle.

== Development ==
On an embryological level the muscle may develop from the first pharyngeal arch mesenchyme in addition to other masticatory muscles. Two main developmental hypotheses include either an un-fused vestige of the deep head of the temporalis muscle which attached before the coronoid process formed, or the muscle fibres of the lateral pterygoid muscle which failed to attach to the temporomandibular joint disc.

== Function ==
The muscle has no confirmed significant function as both end points attach to the immobile parts of the sphenoid or palatine bone which results in no skeletal movement. A proposed hypothesis is that the muscle contraction assists in pushing cooler venous blood from the pterygoid venous plexus to the cavernous sinus to support thermoregulation.

== Clinical significance ==
The muscle has close association with the maxillary artery and trigeminal nerve which suggests possible clinical significance in conditions such as trigeminal neuralgia and temporomandibular joint disorder. Furthermore, it can complicate surgeries which involve the infratemporal fossa and may contribute to asymmetric jaw movement. It has cadaveric dissection rates of 2% (Penhall) and 4.5% (Akita), and a higher frequency of 12.82% observed using in vivo MRI, and is usually noted as being unilateral.
