= Muscular branches of the radial nerve =

Nerve system

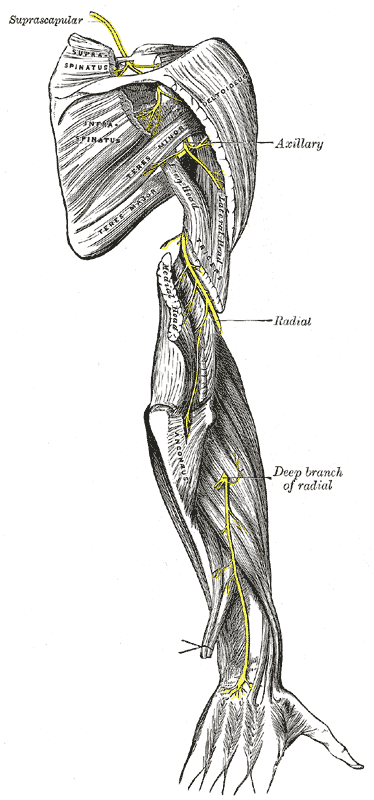
- The suprascapular, axillary, and radial nerves.

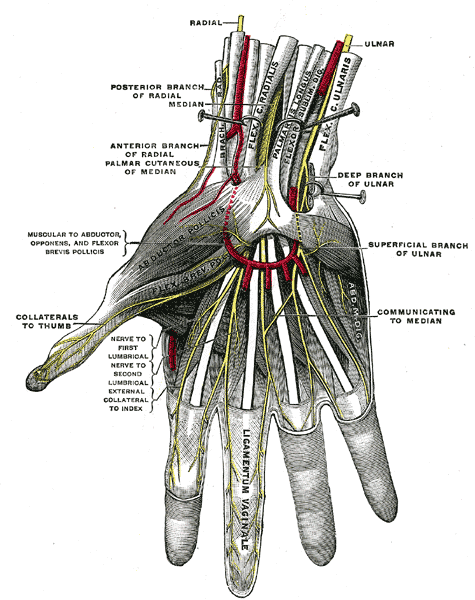
- Superficial palmar nerves.

Details
- From: Radial nerve
- Innervates: Posterior compartment of the arm, mobile wad

Identifiers
- Latin: rami musculares nervi radialis
- TA98: A14.2.03.053
- TA2: 6435
- FMA: 44954

The muscular branches of the radial nerve supply the triceps brachii, anconæus, brachioradialis, and extensor carpi radialis longus, and are grouped as medial, posterior, and lateral.

== Medial ==
The medial muscular branches supply the medial head of the triceps brachii.

That to the medial head is a long, slender filament, which lies close to the ulnar nerve as far as the lower third of the arm, and is therefore frequently spoken of as the ulnar collateral nerve.

== Posterior ==
The posterior muscular branch, of large size, arises from the nerve in the groove between the triceps brachii and the humerus.

It divides into filaments, which supply the medial and lateral heads of the triceps brachii and the anconæus muscles.

The branch for the latter muscle is a long, slender filament, which descends in the substance of the medial head of the triceps brachii.

== Lateral ==
The lateral muscular branches supply the brachioradialis, extensor carpi radialis longus, and the lateral part of the brachialis.
