= Tonsillar branch =

Tonsillar branch may refer to:

- tonsillar branch of the facial artery
- tonsillar branch of posterior inferior cerebellar artery
- tonsillar branch of the glossopharyngeal nerve
- tonsillar branch of the lesser palatine nerves
