= Vertical muscle of tongue =

Intrinsic muscle of the tongue

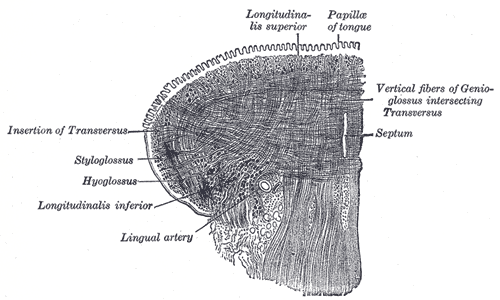
- A coronal section of tongue, showing intrinsic muscles.

Details
- Origin: Submucosal fibrous layer of dorsum of tongue
- Insertion: Inferior surface borders of tongue
- Nerve: Hypoglossal nerve (CN XII)
- Actions: Flattens and broadens tongue

Identifiers
- Latin: musculus verticalis linguae
- TA98: A05.1.04.109
- TA2: 2125
- FMA: 46696

The vertical muscle of the tongue is an intrinsic muscle of the tongue. Its fibers extend from the upper to the under surface of the tongue. It is innervated by the hypoglossal nerve (cranial nerve XII). Its contraction flattens, widens and elongates the tongue.

== Anatomy ==
The vertical muscle of the tongue is an intrinsic muscle of the tongue. It is found only at the borders of the forepart of the tongue.

=== Structure ===
Fibres of the vertical muscle of the tongue are arranged in an almost vertical direction, and intersect the transversely oriented fibres of the transverse muscle of tongue. Fibers of the vertical muscle of the tongue extend from the upper to the under surface of the tongue.

=== Innervation ===
The vertical of the tongue is innervated by the hypoglossal nerve (CN XII).

== Function ==
Contraction of the vertical muscle of the tongue flattens, widens and elongates the tongue.
