= Hyoglossal membrane =

Fibrous lamina under the human tongue

Details

Identifiers
- Latin: Membrana hyoglossus
- FMA: 54817

The hyoglossal membrane is a strong fibrous lamina, which connects the under surface of the root of the tongue to the body of the hyoid bone. It is characterized by a posterior widening of the lingual septum.

This membrane receives, in front, some of the fibers of the Genioglossi. Inferior fibers are attached to hyoglossal membrane, and to the upper anterior body of the midline of hyoid bone.
