= Cervical spinal nerve 3 =

Spinal nerve of the cervical segment

Cervical spinal nerve
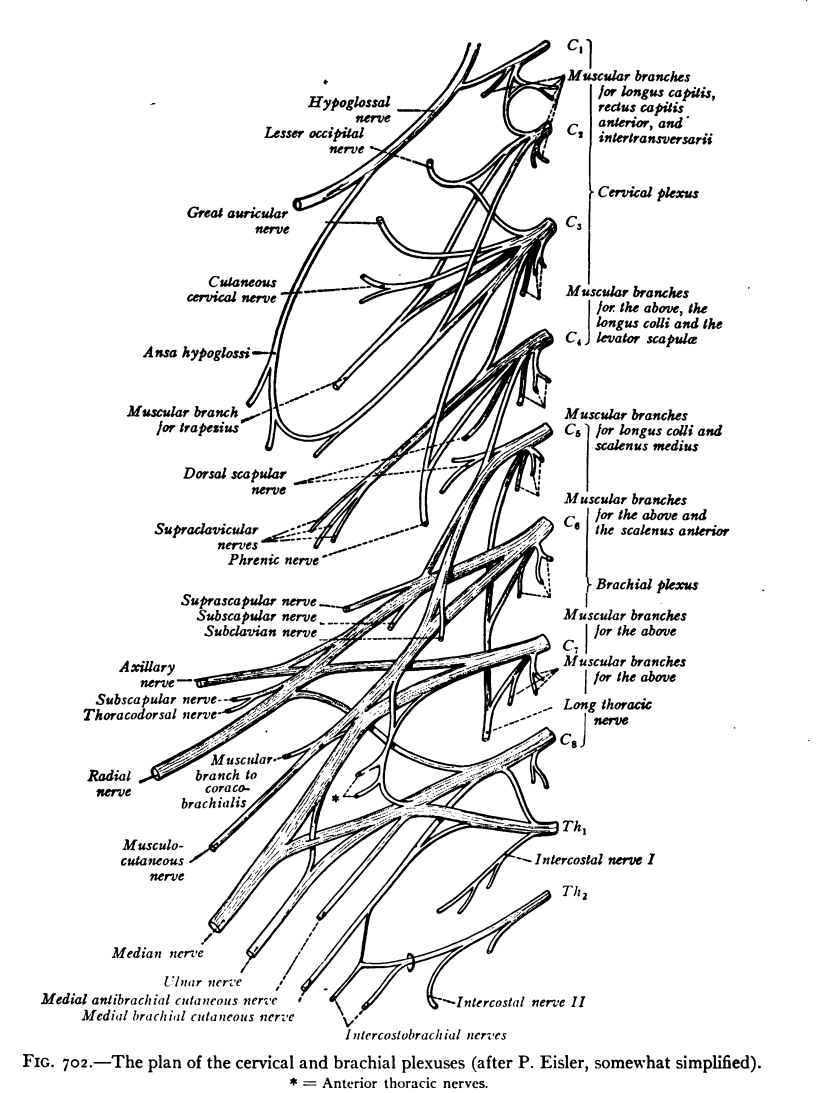
- The plan of the cervical and brachial plexuses.

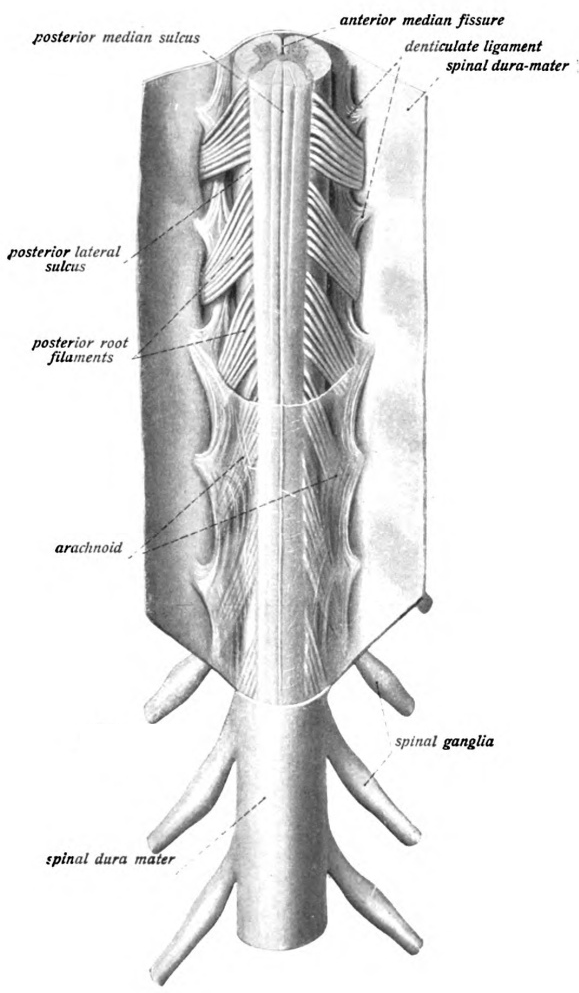
- The spinal cord with spinal nerves.

Details

Identifiers
- Latin: nervi spinalis
- FMA: 6444

The cervical spinal nerve 3 (C3) is a spinal nerve of the cervical segment.

It originates from the spinal column from above the cervical vertebra 3 (C3).
