= Antitragus =

Part of the ear

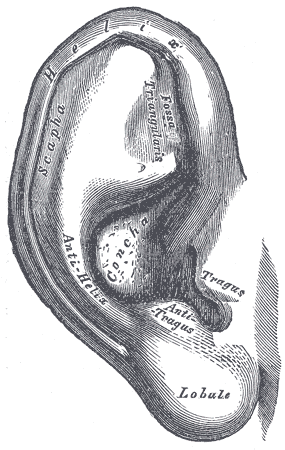
- The auricula. Lateral surface.

Details

Identifiers
- Latin: antitragus
- TA98: A15.3.01.016
- TA2: 110
- FMA: 61001

The antitragus is a feature of mammalian ear anatomy.

In humans, it is a small tubercle on the visible part of the ear, the auricle. The antitragus is located just above the earlobe and points anteriorly. It is separated from the tragus by the intertragic notch.

The antitragicus muscle, an intrinsic muscle of the ear, arises from the outer part of the antitragus.

The antitragus can be much larger in some other species, most notably bats.

The antitragus can be pierced.

== Additional images ==
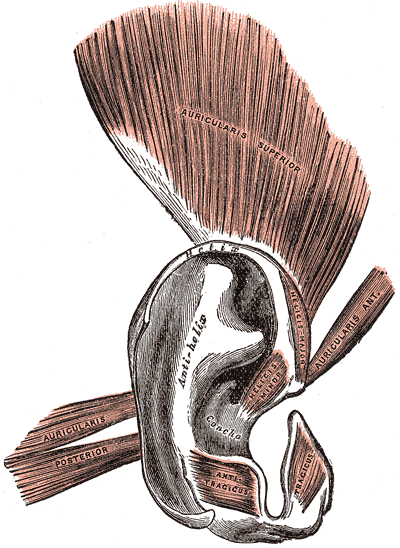
The muscles of the auricula

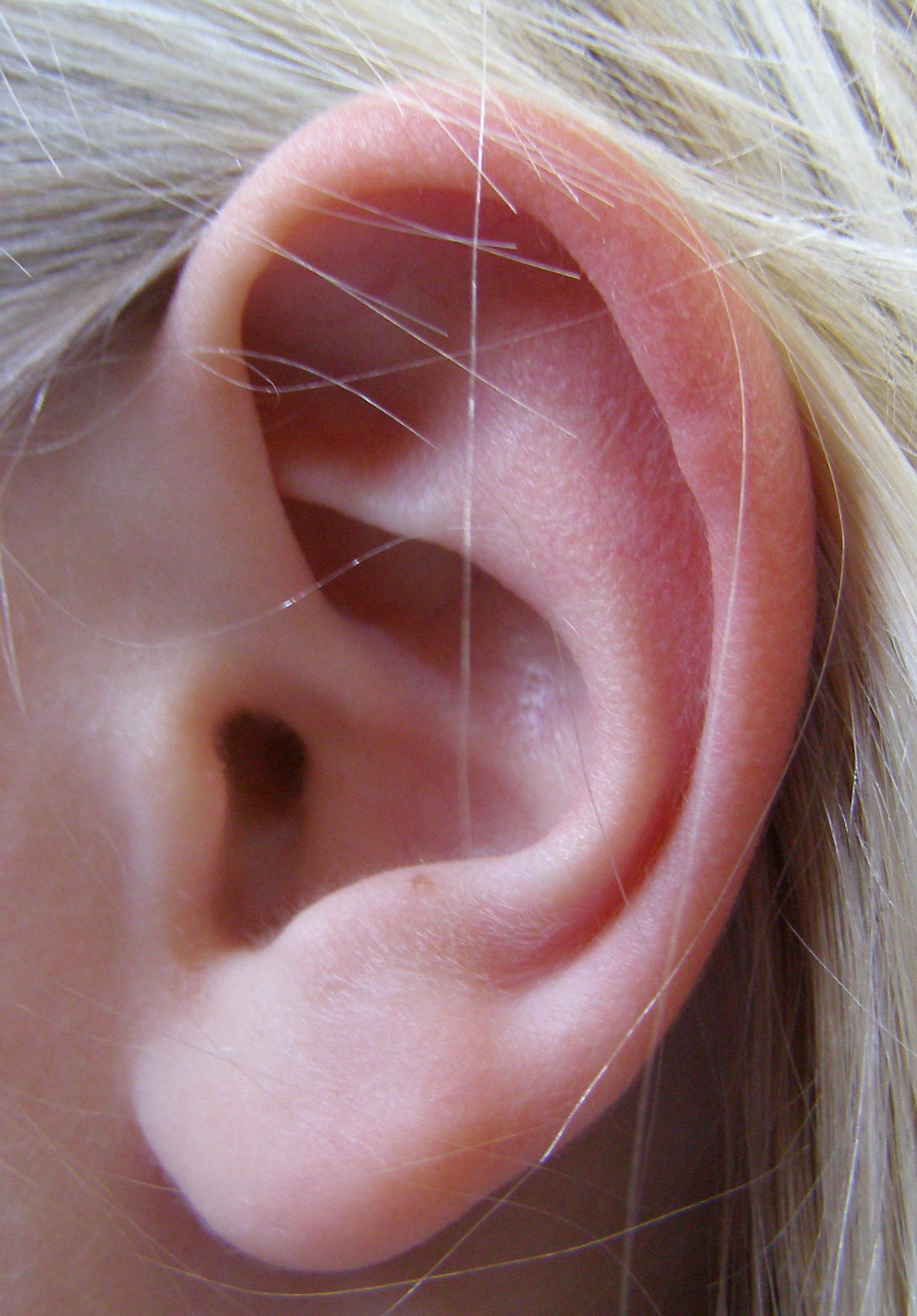
Left human ear

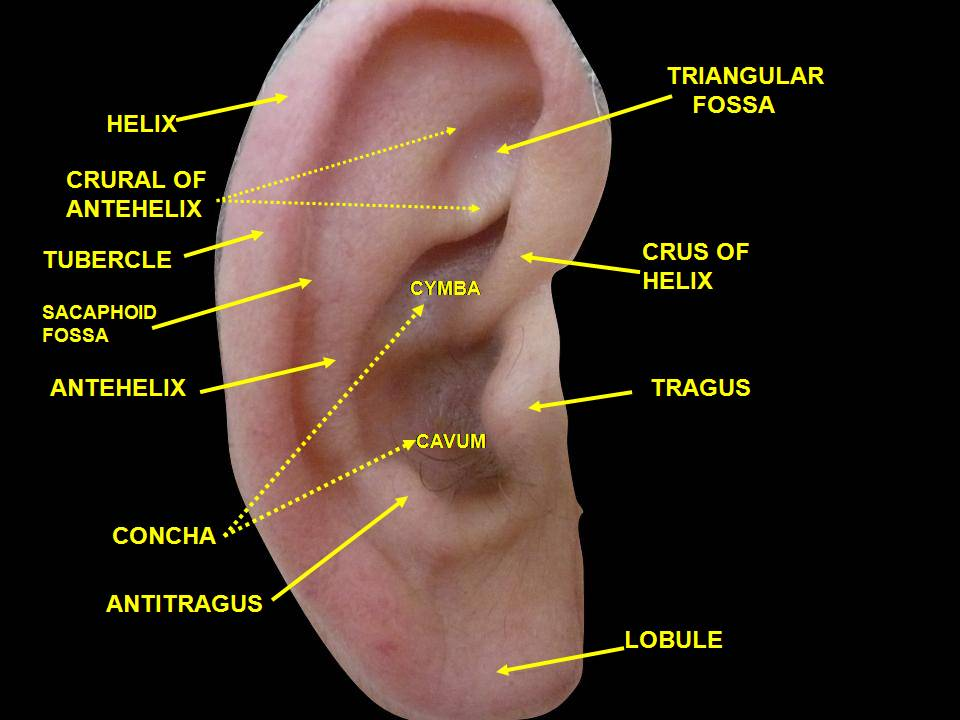
External ear. Right auricle. Lateral view.

== See also ==
- Antitragus piercing
