= Lingual septum =

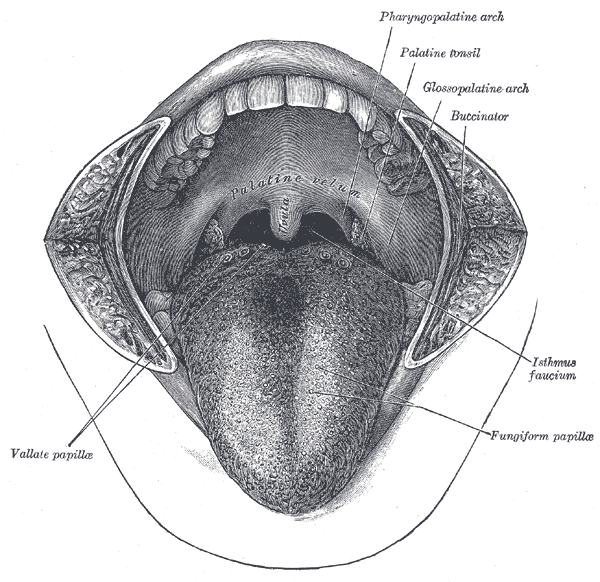
- The mouth cavity. The cheeks have been slit transversely and the tongue pulled forward. (Lingual septum is visible at center of tongue, but not labeled.)

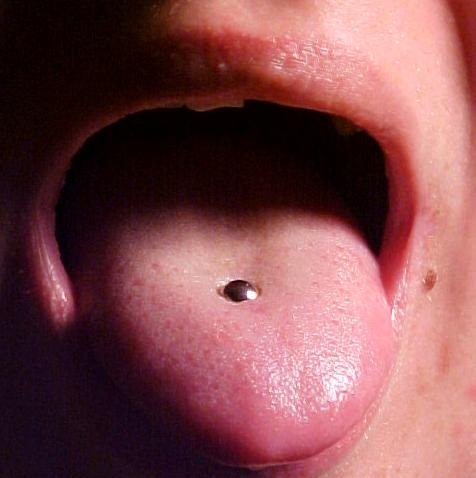
- A pierced tongue, which has not accommodated for swelling

Details

Identifiers
- Latin: septum linguae

The lingual septum consists of a vertical layer of fibrous tissue, extending throughout the entire length of the median plane of the tongue, though not quite reaching the dorsum. The lingual septum is closely associated with the hyoglossus membrane, allowing the binding of the tongue to the hyoid muscles.

Visualization through implementing a vertical groove along the tongue called the median sulcus.

It is thicker behind than in front, and occasionally contains a small fibrocartilage, about 6 mm. in length.

== See also ==
- Tongue piercing
- Tongue splitting
- Mouth cavity
- Tongue
- Fibrous tissue
