= Levatores costarum muscles =

Muscle alongside the spinal column

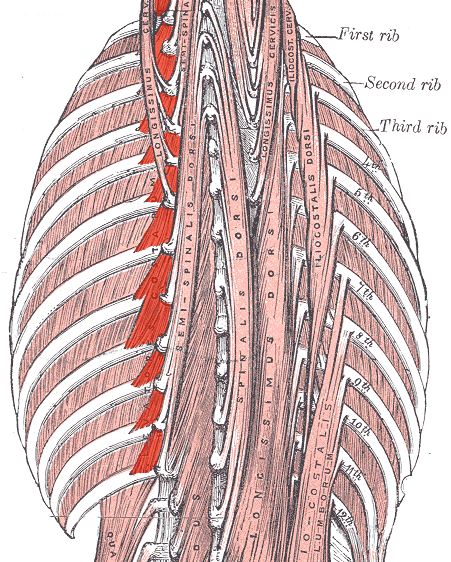
- Deep muscles of the back. (Levatores costarum labeled vertically at center left.)

Details
- Origin: Transverse processes of C7 to T11 vertebrae
- Insertion: Superior surfaces of the ribs immediately inferior to the preceding vertebrae
- Nerve: Dorsal rami C8-T11 (Intercostal nerves)
- Actions: Assists in elevation of the thoracic rib cage

Identifiers
- Latin: musculi levatores costarum
- TA98: A04.4.01.009
- TA2: 2308
- FMA: 71312

The levatores costarum (/ˌlɛvəˈtɔːriːz kəˈstɛərəm/), twelve in number on either side, are small tendinous and fleshy bundles, which arise from the ends of the transverse processes of the seventh cervical and upper eleven thoracic vertebrae.

They pass obliquely downward and laterally, like the fibers of the Intercostales externi, and each is inserted into the outer surface of the rib immediately below the vertebra from which it takes origin, between the tubercle and the angle (Levatores costarum breves).

Each of the four lower muscles divides into two fasciculi, one of which is inserted as above described; the other passes down to the second rib below its origin (Levatores costarum longi).

They have a role in forceful inspiration.

== See also ==
- Iliocostalis
- Interspinales muscles
- Intertransversarii muscle
- Longissimus
- Spinalis
