= Interspinales muscles =

Short bundles of skeletal muscle fibre

Details
- Origin: Spinous process
- Insertion: Spinous process
- Nerve: Posterior rami of spinal nerves
- Actions: Proprioception of vertebral column

Identifiers
- Latin: musculi interspinales
- TA98: A04.3.02.301
- TA2: 2290
- FMA: 71306 22841, 71306

The interspinales are short muscle fascicles, found in pairs between the spinous processes of the contiguous vertebrae, one on either side of the interspinal ligament.

- In the cervical region, the cervical interspinales are most distinct, and consist of six pairs, the first being situated between the axis and third vertebra, and the last between the seventh cervical and the first thoracic. They are small narrow bundles, attached, above and below, to the apices of the spinous processes.
- In the thoracic region, the thoracic interspinales are found between the first and second vertebrae, and sometimes between the second and third, and between the eleventh and twelfth.
- In the lumbar region, there are four pairs of lumbar interspinales in the intervals between the five lumbar vertebrae. There is also occasionally one between the last thoracic and first lumbar, and one between the fifth lumbar and the sacrum.

== See also ==
- Intertransversarii
- Iliocostalis
- Longissimus
- Spinalis
- Levatores costarum
