= Mobile wad =

Group of muscles in the forearm

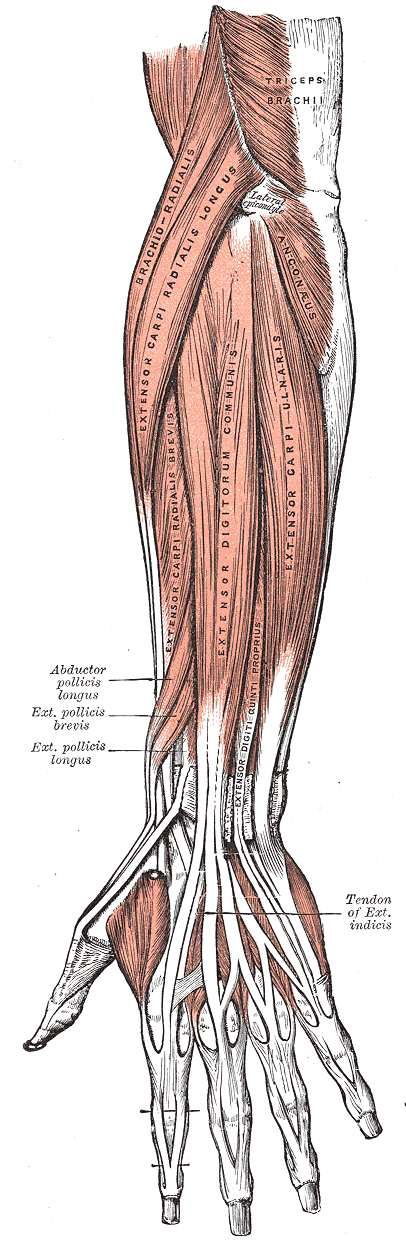
- Posterior surface of the forearm. Superficial muscles. (Muscles of mobile wad visible at center left.)

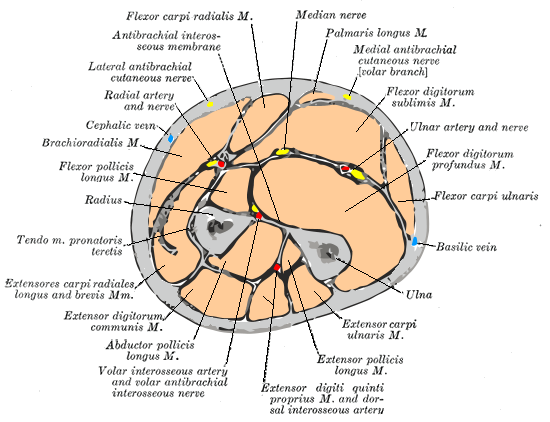
- Cross-section through the middle of the forearm. (Muscles of mobile wad visible at center left.)

Details
- Artery: Radial artery
- Nerve: Muscular branches of the radial nerve

The mobile wad (or mobile wad of Henry) is a group of the following three muscles found in the lateral compartment of the forearm:

- brachioradialis
- extensor carpi radialis brevis
- extensor carpi radialis longus

It is also sometimes known as the "wad of three", "lateral compartment", or "radial group" of the forearm.

== Function ==
These three muscles act as flexors at the elbow joint.

The extensor carpi radialis brevis and longus are both weak flexors at the elbow joint. Brevis moves the arm from ulnar abduction to its mid-position and flexes dorsally. Longus is a weak pronator in the flexed arm and a supinator in the outstretched arm. At the carpal joints longus acts in dorsiflexion with the extensor carpi ulnaris and in radial abduction with the flexor carpi radialis. These two muscles are called "fist clenchers" because they must be slightly flexed dorsally during clenching to permit maximal flexion.

Brachoradialis is inserted distally on the radius end therefore, unlike the previous two muscles, only acts on the forearm. It brings the forearm into midposition between supination and pronation, and in this position it acts as a flexor. In slow movements and in the supinated forearm it has a minimal flexor action.
