= Thumb extensors =

In anatomy, the thumb extensors are:

- extensor pollicis longus muscle
- extensor pollicis brevis muscle
