= Articularis cubiti muscle =

Elbow muscle

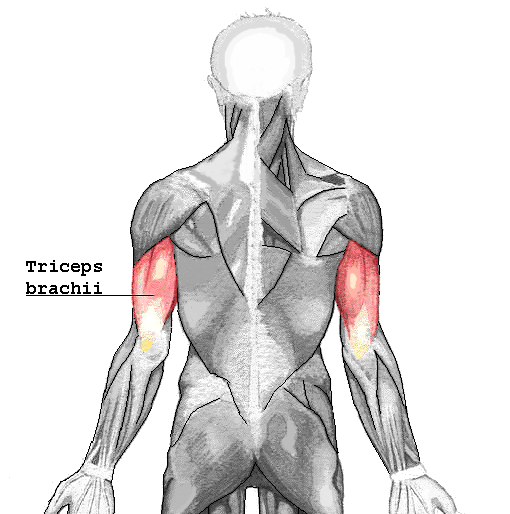
- Triceps brachii

Details
- Origin: Deep distal surface of medial head of triceps
- Insertion: Posterior capsule of elbow joint
- Artery: Deep artery of arm
- Nerve: Radial nerve
- Actions: Lifts capsule away from joint

Identifiers
- Latin: musculus articularis cubiti
- TA98: A04.6.02.024
- TA2: 2475
- FMA: 37701

The articularis cubiti muscle is a muscle of the elbow.

It is considered by some sources to be a part of the triceps brachii muscle.

It is also known as the "subanconeus muscle", for its relationship to the anconeus muscle.

It is classified as a muscle of the posterior brachium.
