= Transverse muscle of tongue =

Intrinsic muscle of the tongue

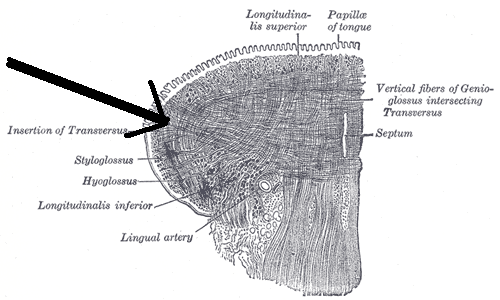
- Coronal section of tongue, showing intrinsic muscles.

Details
- Origin: Median fibrous septum
- Insertion: Sides of the tongue
- Nerve: Hypoglossal nerve (CN XII)
- Actions: Makes the tongue narrow and elongated

Identifiers
- Latin: musculus transversus linguae
- TA98: A05.1.04.108
- TA2: 2124
- FMA: 46695

The transverse muscle of tongue (transversus linguae) is an intrinsic muscle of the tongue. It consists of fibers which arise from the median fibrous septum. It passes laterally to insert into the submucous fibrous tissue at the sides of the tongue. It is innervated by the hypoglossal nerve (cranial nerve XII). Its contraction elongates and narrows the tongue.

== Structure ==
The transverse muscle of the tongue is an intrinsic muscle of the tongue. It consists of fibers which arise from the median fibrous septum. It passes laterally to insert into the submucous fibrous tissue at the sides of the tongue.

=== Innervation ===
The transverse lingual muscle is innervated by the hypoglossal nerve (CN XII).

== Function ==
Contraction of the transverse muscle of the tongue elongates and narrows the tongue.
