= Intertransversarii =

Skeletal muscle

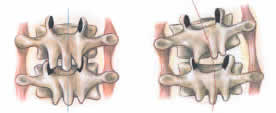
- Intertransversarii muscles

Details
- Origin: Transverse process
- Insertion: Transverse process above
- Nerve: Ventral rami and dorsal rami of spinal nerves
- Actions: Lateral flexion of trunk

Identifiers
- Latin: musculi intertransversarii
- TA98: A04.3.02.401
- TA2: 2294
- FMA: 22848

The intertransversarii are small muscles placed between the transverse processes of the vertebrae.

== Structure ==
=== Cervical ===
In the cervical region they are best developed, consisting of rounded muscular and tendinous fasciculi, and are placed in pairs, passing between the anterior and the posterior tubercles respectively of the transverse processes of two contiguous vertebrae, and separated from one another by an anterior primary division of the cervical nerve, which lies in the groove between them.

- The muscles connecting the anterior tubercles are termed the anterior intertransversarii.
- Those between the posterior tubercles are termed the posterior intertransversarii.

Both sets are supplied by the anterior rami of the spinal nerves.

There are seven pairs of these muscles, the first pair being between the atlas and axis, and the last pair between the seventh cervical and first thoracic vertebræ.

=== Thoracic ===
In the thoracic region they are present between the transverse processes of the lower three thoracic vertebrae, and between the transverse processes of the last thoracic and the first lumbar. These are called the thoracic intertransversarii and are supplied by the posterior rami of the spinal nerves.

=== Lumbar ===
In the lumbar region they are arranged in pairs, on either side of the vertebral column,

- one set occupying the entire interspace between the transverse processes of the lumbar vertebrae, are the lateral lumbar intertransversarii.
- the other set, the medial lumbar intertransversarii, passing from the accessory process of one vertebra to the mammillary of the vertebra below.

The intertransversarii laterales are supplied by the anterior rami, and the intertransversarii mediales by the posterior rami of the spinal nerves.

== Function ==
They contribute little to no movement on their own, but they stabilize adjoining vertebrae allowing more effective action from other muscle groups.

== See also ==
- Iliocostalis
- Interspinales muscles
- Levatores costarum muscles
- Longissimus
- Spinalis
