= Cauda helicis =

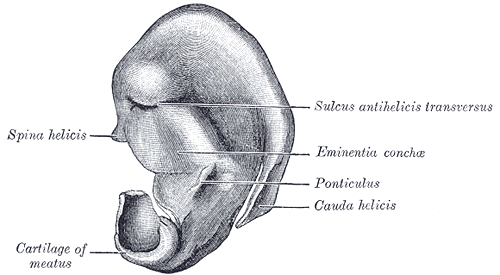
- Cranial surface of cartilage of right auricula. (Cauda helicis labeled at bottom right.)

Identifiers
- TA98: A15.3.01.008
- TA2: 953
- FMA: 61028

In the lower part of the helix, the cartilage is prolonged downward as a tail-like process, the cauda helicis; this is separated from the antihelix by a fissure, the fissura antitragohelicina.
