= Infratemporal crest =

Section of the human skull

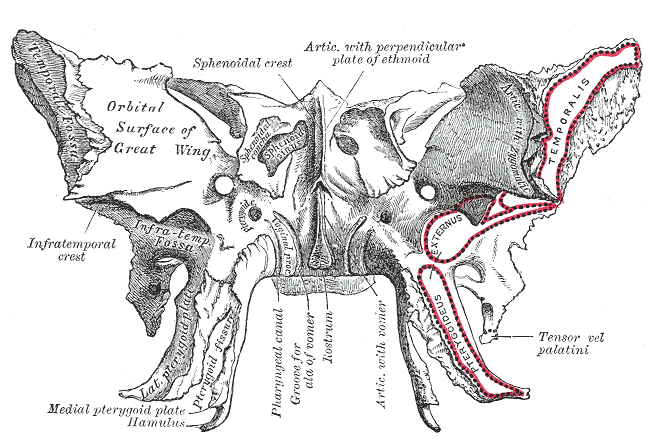
- Sphenoid bone. Anterior and inferior surfaces. (Infratemporal crest labeled at center left.)

Details

Identifiers
- Latin: crista infratemporalis
- TA98: A02.1.05.028
- TA2: 614
- FMA: 75045 54793, 75045

The lateral surface of the greater wing of the sphenoid is convex, and divided by a transverse ridge, the infratemporal crest, into two portions.

The superior or temporal portion, convex from above downward, concave from before backward, forms a part of the temporal fossa, and gives attachment to the temporalis; the inferior or infratemporal, smaller in size and concave, enters into the formation of the infratemporal fossa, and, together with the infratemporal crest, affords attachment to the pterygoideus externus.

== Additional images ==
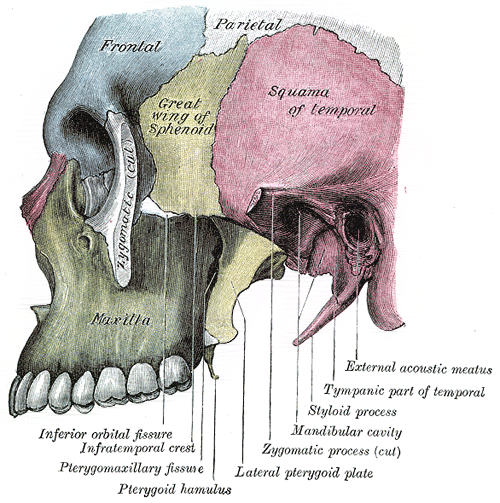
Left infratemporal fossa
