= Sacral spinal nerve 4 =

Sacral spinal nerve
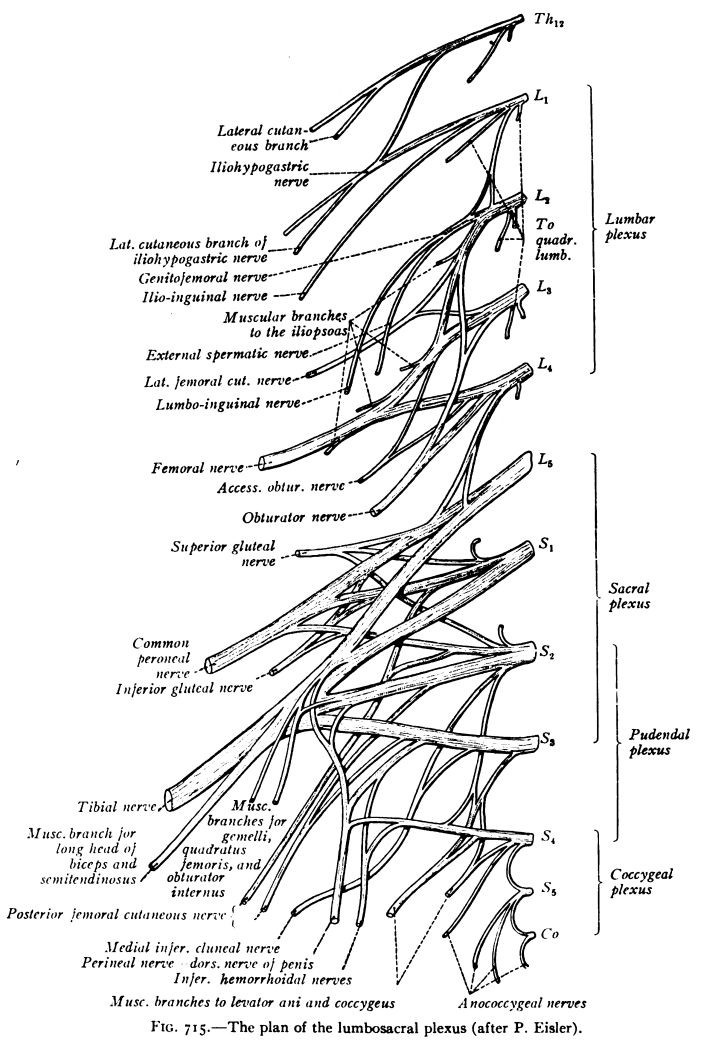
- The plan of the lumbosacral plexus

Details

Identifiers
- Latin: nervi spinalis
- FMA: 6426

The sacral spinal nerve 4 (S4) is a spinal nerve of the sacral segment.

It originates from the spinal column from below the 4th body of the sacrum

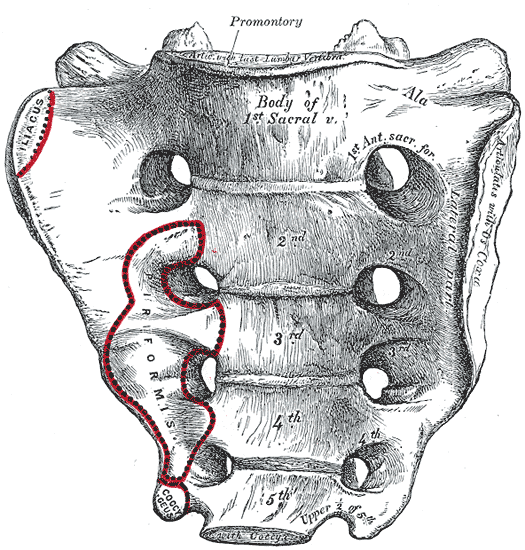
Sacrum, showing bodies in center.

== Muscles ==
S4 supplies many muscles, either directly or through nerves originating from S4. They are not innervated with S4 as single origin, but partly by S4 and partly by other spinal nerves. The muscles are:

- iliococcygeus
- puborectalis
- coccygeus
- sphincter ani externus muscle
- sphincter urethrae membranaceae

== Additional images ==
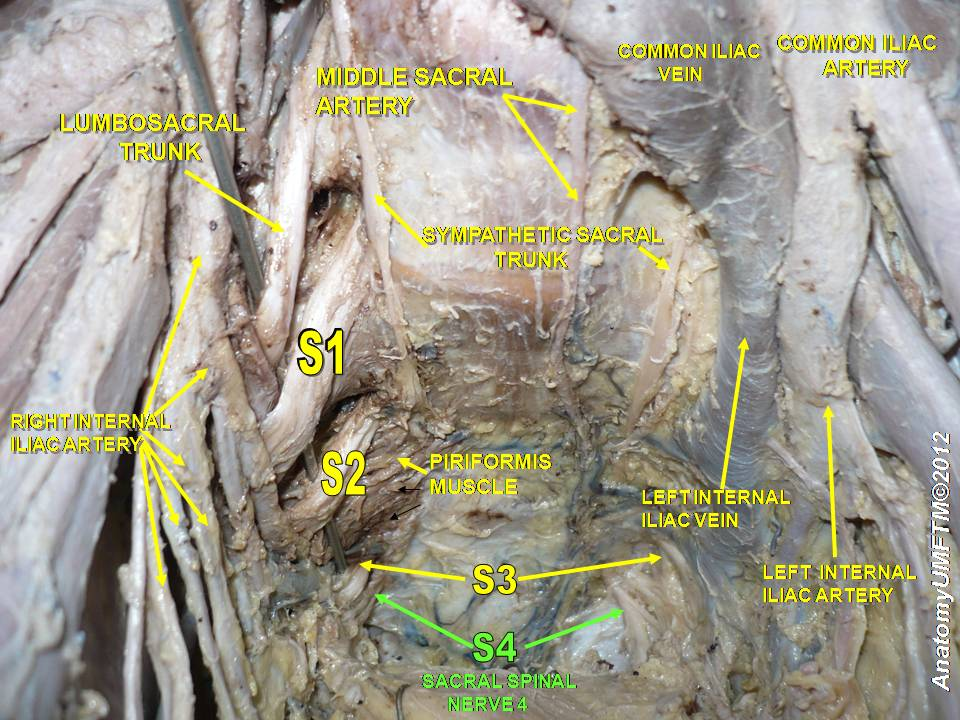
Sacral spinal nerve 4
