= Auricular branch of occipital artery =

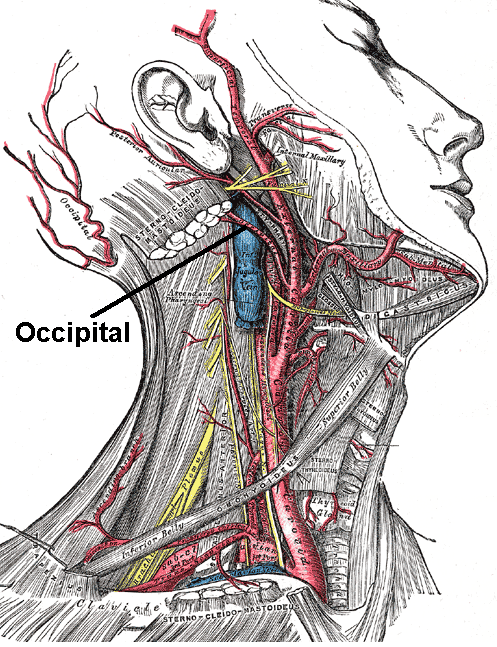
- Superficial dissection of the right side of the neck, showing the carotid and subclavian arteries

Details
- Source: Occipital artery

Identifiers
- Latin: ramus auricularis arteriae occipitalis
- TA98: A12.2.05.032
- TA2: 4400
- FMA: 49602

The auricular branch of occipital artery supplies the back of the concha and frequently gives off a branch, which enters the skull through the mastoid foramen and supplies the dura mater, the diploë, and the mastoid cells; this latter branch sometimes arises from the occipital artery, and is then known as the mastoid branch.
