= Auricular branch of posterior auricular artery =

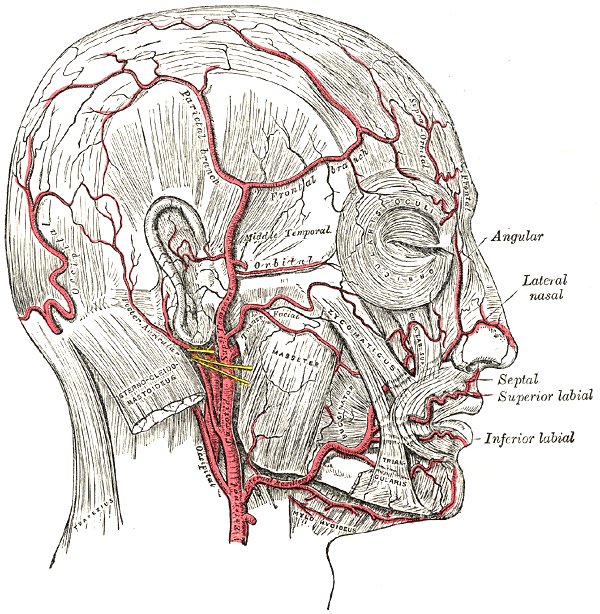
- The arteries of the face and scalp.

Details
- Source: Posterior auricular artery

Identifiers
- Latin: ramus auricularis arteriae auricularis posterioris
- TA98: A12.2.05.042
- TA2: 4410
- FMA: 49641

The auricular branch of posterior auricular artery is a small artery in the head. It branches off the posterior auricular artery and ascends behind the ear, beneath the posterior auricular muscle, and is distributed to the back of the auricula, upon which it ramifies minutely, some branches curving around the margin of the cartilage, others perforating it, to supply the anterior surface. It anastomoses with the parietal and anterior auricular branches of the superficial temporal artery.
