= Palatal muscle =

Palatal muscles may refer to:

- Levator veli palatini
- Tensor veli palatini muscle
- Musculus uvulae
- Palatoglossus muscle
- Palatopharyngeus muscle
