= Palatopharyngeus muscle =

Muscle in the roof of the mouth

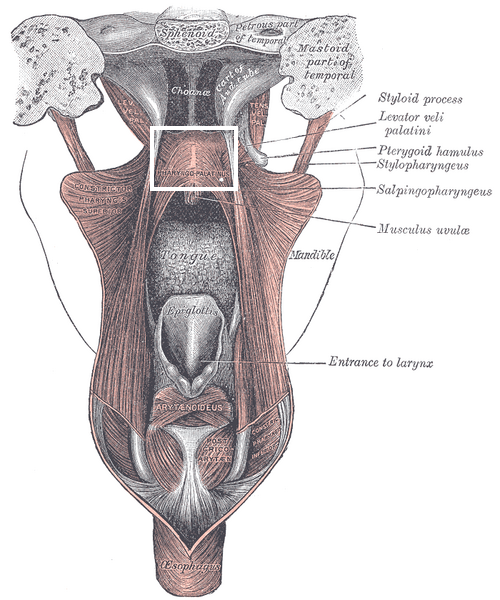
- Dissection of the muscles of the palate from behind (palatopharyngeus muscle labeled as pharyngopalatinus labeled at top center, below choanae)

Details
- Origin: Palatine aponeurosis and hard palate
- Insertion: Upper border of thyroid cartilage (blends with constrictor fibers)
- Artery: Facial artery
- Nerve: Pharyngeal branch of vagus nerve
- Actions: Pulls pharynx and larynx upward

Identifiers
- Latin: musculus palatopharyngeus
- TA98: A05.2.01.105
- TA2: 2132
- FMA: 46666

The palatopharyngeus (palatopharyngeal or pharyngopalatinus) muscle is a small muscle in the roof of the mouth.

It is a long, fleshy fasciculus, narrower in the middle than at either end, forming, with the mucous membrane covering its surface, the palatopharyngeal arch.

== Structure ==
It is separated from the palatoglossus muscle by an angular interval, in which the palatine tonsil is lodged. It arises from the soft palate, where it is divided into two fasciculi by the levator veli palatini and musculus uvulae.

- The posterior fasciculus lies in contact with the mucous membrane, and joins with that of the opposite muscle in the middle line.
- The anterior fasciculus, the thicker, lies in the soft palate between the levator and tensor veli palatini muscles, and joins in the middle line the corresponding part of the opposite muscle.

Passing laterally and downward behind the palatine tonsil, the palatopharyngeus joins the stylopharyngeus and is inserted with that muscle into the posterior border of the thyroid cartilage, some of its fibers being lost on the side of the pharynx and others passing across the middle line posteriorly to decussate with the muscle of the opposite side.

=== Innervation ===
Motor innervation of this muscle is provided through the pharyngeal plexus of the CN X (vagal nerve), SVE (special visceral efferent) fibers.

== Function ==
The palatine velum is slightly raised by the levator veli palatini and made tense by the tensor veli palatini; the palatopharyngeus muscles, by their contraction, pull the pharynx upward over the bolus of food and nearly come together, the uvula filling up the slight interval between them.

By these means the bolus is prevented from passing into the nasopharynx; at the same time, the palatopharyngeus muscles form an inclined plane, directed obliquely downward and backward, along the under surface of which the bolus descends into the lower part of the pharynx.

== Additional images ==
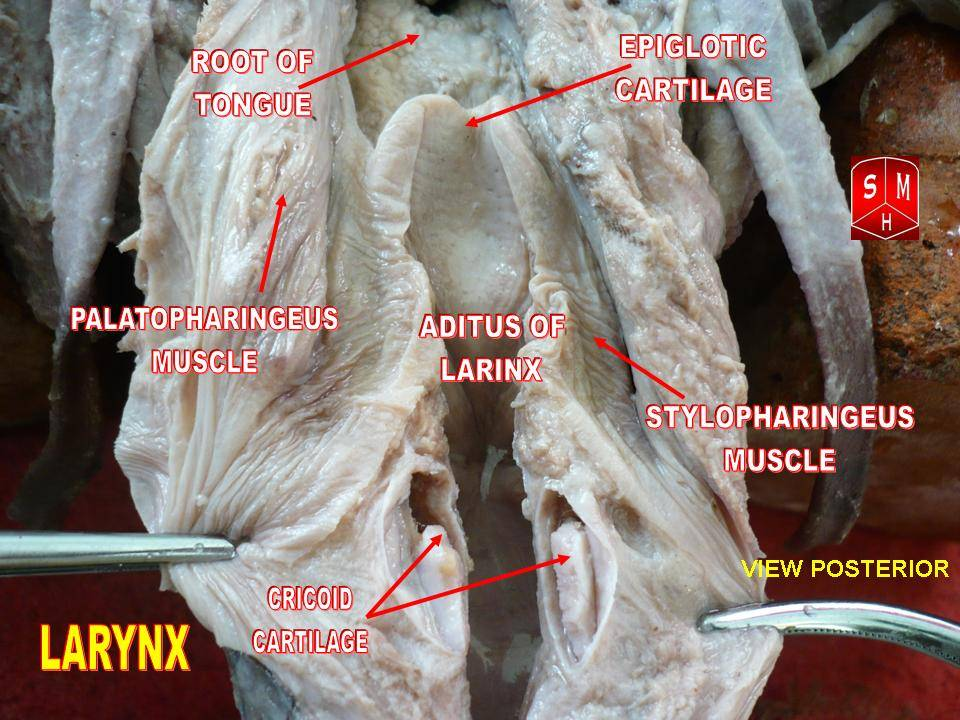
Cadaver dissection showing the palatopharyngeus muscle
