= Tongue =

Muscular organ in the mouth of most vertebrates

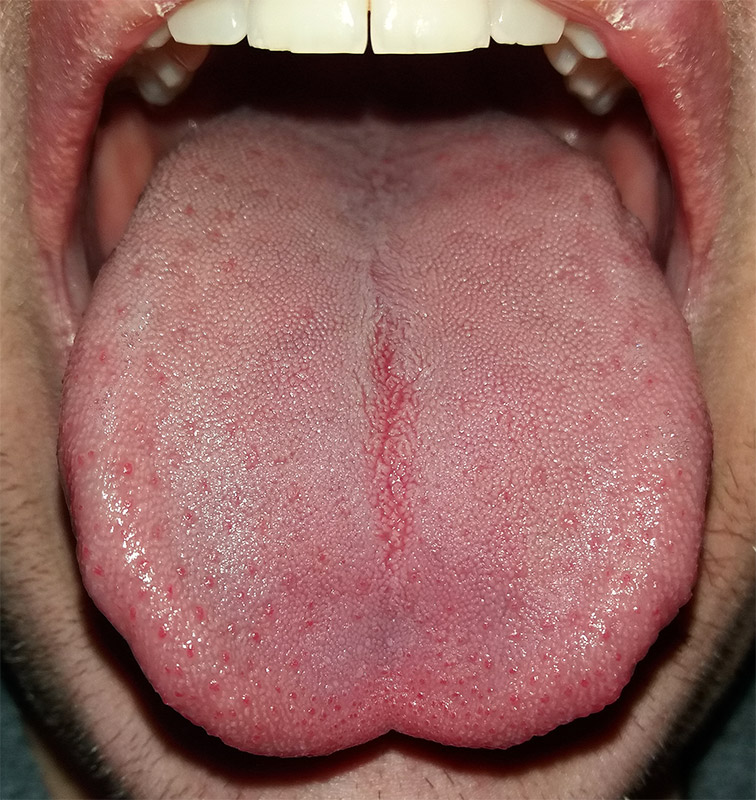
- The human tongue

Details
- Precursor: Pharyngeal arches, lateral lingual swelling, tuberculum impar
- System: Alimentary tract, gustatory system
- Artery: Lingual, tonsillar branch, ascending pharyngeal
- Vein: Lingual
- Nerve: Sensory; Anterior two-thirds: Lingual (sensation) and chorda tympani (taste); Posterior one-third: Glossopharyngeal (IX); Motor; Hypoglossal (XII), except palatoglossus muscle supplied by the pharyngeal plexus via vagus (X)
- Lymph: Deep cervical, submandibular, submental

Identifiers
- Latin: lingua
- Greek: γλῶσσα (glôssa)
- MeSH: D014059
- TA98: A05.1.04.001
- TA2: 2820
- FMA: 54640

The tongue is a muscular organ in the mouth of a typical tetrapod. It manipulates food for chewing and swallowing as part of the digestive process and is the primary organ of taste. The tongue's upper surface (dorsum) is covered by taste buds housed in numerous lingual papillae. It is sensitive and kept moist by saliva and is richly supplied with nerves and blood vessels. The tongue also serves as a natural means of cleaning the teeth. A major function of the tongue is to enable speech in humans and vocalization in other animals.

The human tongue is divided into two parts, an oral part at the front and a pharyngeal part at the back. The left and right sides are also separated along most of its length by a vertical section of fibrous tissue (the lingual septum) that results in a groove, the median sulcus, on the tongue's surface.

There are two groups of glossal muscles. The four intrinsic muscles alter the shape of the tongue and are not attached to bone. The four paired extrinsic muscles change the position of the tongue and are anchored to bone.

== Etymology ==
The word tongue derives from the Old English tunge, which comes from Proto-Germanic *tungōn. It has cognates in other Germanic languages—for example tonge in West Frisian, tong in Dutch and Afrikaans, Zunge in German, tunge in Danish and Norwegian, and tunga in Icelandic, Faroese and Swedish. The ue ending of the word seems to be a fourteenth-century attempt to show "proper pronunciation", but it is "neither etymological nor phonetic". Some used the spelling tunge and tonge as late as the sixteenth century.

== In humans ==
=== Structure ===
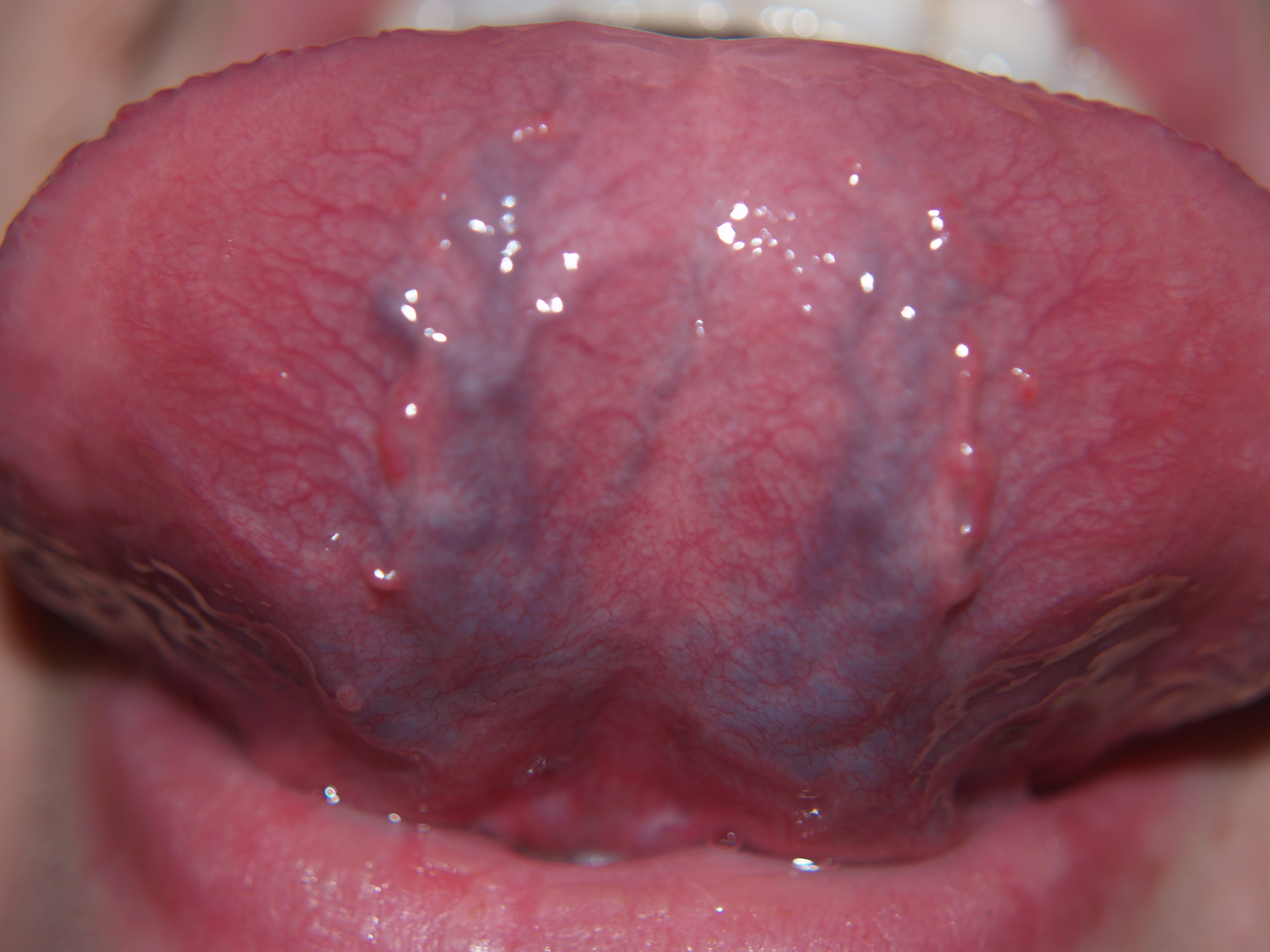
The underside of a human tongue, showing its rich blood supply

The tongue is a muscular hydrostat that forms part of the floor of the oral cavity. The left and right sides of the tongue are separated by a vertical section of fibrous tissue known as the lingual septum. This division is along the length of the tongue save for the very back of the pharyngeal part and is visible as a groove called the median sulcus. The human tongue is divided into anterior and posterior parts by the terminal sulcus, which is a "V"-shaped groove. The apex of the terminal sulcus is marked by a blind foramen, the foramen cecum, which is a remnant of the median thyroid diverticulum in early embryonic development. The anterior oral part is the visible part situated at the front and makes up roughly two-thirds the length of the tongue. The posterior pharyngeal part is the part closest to the throat, roughly one-third of its length. These parts differ in terms of their embryological development and nerve supply.

The anterior tongue is, at its apex, thin and narrow. It is directed forward against the lingual surfaces of the lower incisor teeth. The posterior part is, at its root, directed backward, and connected with the hyoid bone by the hyoglossi and genioglossi muscles and the hyoglossal membrane, with the epiglottis by three glossoepiglottic folds of mucous membrane, with the soft palate by the glossopalatine arches, and with the pharynx by the superior pharyngeal constrictor muscle and the mucous membrane. It also forms the anterior wall of the oropharynx.

The average length of the human tongue from the oropharynx to the tip is 10 cm. The average weight of the human tongue from adult males is 99g and for adult females 79g.

In phonetics and phonology, a distinction is made between the tip of the tongue and the blade (the portion just behind the tip). Sounds made with the tongue tip are said to be apical, while those made with the tongue blade are said to be laminal.

Tongue posture is the resting position of the tongue in the mouth. Evidence demonstrates that the tongue plays a role in mouth and face development.

==== Upper surface ====
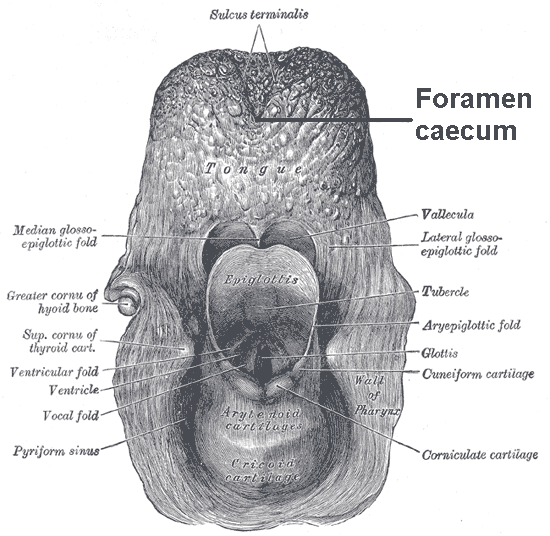
Foramen cecum and terminal sulcus labelled above

Features of the tongue surface

The upper surface of the tongue, the dorsal surface, is called the dorsum, and is divided by a groove into symmetrical halves by the median sulcus. The foramen cecum marks the end of this division (at about 2.5 cm (0.98 in) from the root of the tongue) and the beginning of the terminal sulcus. The foramen cecum is also the point of attachment of the thyroglossal duct and is formed during the descent of the thyroid diverticulum in embryonic development.

The terminal sulcus is a shallow groove that runs forward as a shallow groove in a V shape from the foramen cecum, forwards and outwards to the margins (borders) of the tongue. The terminal sulcus divides the tongue into a posterior pharyngeal part and an anterior oral part. The pharyngeal part is supplied by the glossopharyngeal nerve and the oral part is supplied by the lingual nerve (a branch of the mandibular branch (V3) of the trigeminal nerve) for somatosensory perception and by the chorda tympani (a branch of the facial nerve) for taste perception.

Both parts of the tongue develop from different pharyngeal arches.

==== Undersurface ====
On the undersurface, the ventral surface, of the tongue is a fold of mucous membrane called the frenulum that tethers the tongue at the midline to the floor of the mouth. On either side of the frenulum are small prominences called sublingual caruncles that the major salivary submandibular glands drain into.

==== Muscles ====
The eight muscles of the human tongue are classified as either intrinsic or extrinsic. The four intrinsic muscles act to change the shape of the tongue, and are not attached to any bone. The four extrinsic muscles act to change the position of the tongue, and are anchored to bone.

===== Extrinsic =====
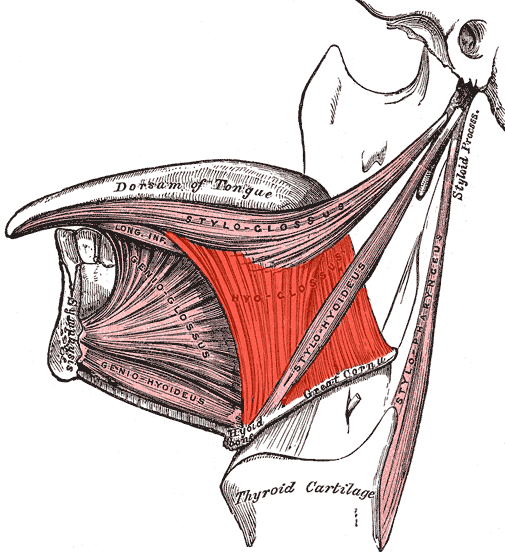
Lateral view of the tongue, with extrinsic muscles highlighted

The four extrinsic muscles originate from bone and extend to the tongue. They are the genioglossus, the hyoglossus (often including the chondroglossus) the styloglossus, and the palatoglossus. Their main functions are altering the tongue's position allowing for protrusion, retraction, and side-to-side movement.

The genioglossus arises from the mandible and protrudes the tongue. It is also known as the tongue's "safety muscle" since it is the only muscle that propels the tongue forward.

The hyoglossus, arises from the hyoid bone and retracts and depresses the tongue. The chondroglossus is often included with this muscle.

The styloglossus arises from the styloid process of the temporal bone and draws the sides of the tongue up to create a trough for swallowing.

The palatoglossus arises from the palatine aponeurosis, and depresses the soft palate, moves the palatoglossal fold towards the midline, and elevates the back of the tongue during swallowing.

===== Intrinsic =====
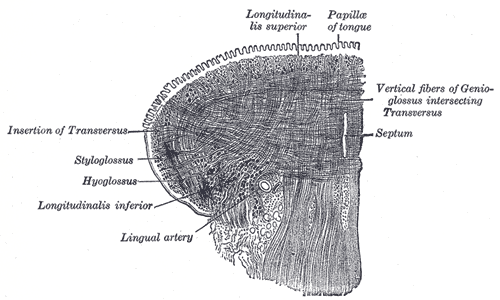
Coronal section of tongue, showing intrinsic muscles

Four paired intrinsic muscles of the tongue originate and insert within the tongue, running along its length. They are the superior longitudinal muscle, the inferior longitudinal muscle, the vertical muscle, and the transverse muscle. These muscles alter the shape of the tongue by lengthening and shortening it, curling and uncurling its apex and edges as in tongue rolling, and flattening and rounding its surface. This provides shape and helps facilitate speech, swallowing, and eating.

The superior longitudinal muscle runs along the upper surface of the tongue under the mucous membrane, and functions to shorten and curl the tongue upward. It originates near the epiglottis, at the hyoid bone, from the median fibrous septum.

The inferior longitudinal muscle lines the sides of the tongue, and is joined to the styloglossus muscle. It functions to shorten and curl the tongue downward.

The vertical muscle is located in the middle of the tongue, and joins the superior and inferior longitudinal muscles. It functions to flatten the tongue.

The transverse muscle divides the tongue at the middle, and is attached to the mucous membranes that run along the sides. It functions to lengthen and narrow the tongue.

==== Blood supply ====
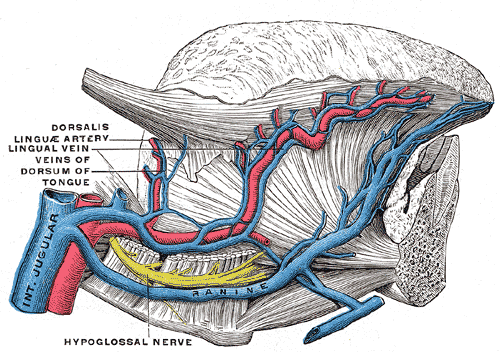
Blood supply of the tongue

The tongue receives its blood supply primarily from the lingual artery, a branch of the external carotid artery. The lingual veins drain into the internal jugular vein. The floor of the mouth also receives its blood supply from the lingual artery. There is also a secondary blood supply to the root of tongue from the tonsillar branch of the facial artery and the ascending pharyngeal artery.

An area in the neck sometimes called the Pirogov triangle is formed by the intermediate tendon of the digastric muscle, the posterior border of the mylohyoid muscle, and the hypoglossal nerve. The lingual artery is a good place to stop severe hemorrhage from the tongue.

==== Nerve supply ====
Innervation of the tongue consists of motor fibers, special sensory fibers for taste, and general sensory fibers for sensation.

- Motor supply for all intrinsic and extrinsic muscles of the tongue is supplied by efferent motor nerve fibers from the hypoglossal nerve (CN XII), with the exception of the palatoglossus, which is innervated by the vagus nerve (CN X).

Innervation of taste and sensation is different for the anterior and posterior part of the tongue because they are derived from different embryological structures (pharyngeal arch 1 and pharyngeal arches 3 and 4, respectively).

- Anterior two-thirds of tongue (anterior to the vallate papillae):
  - Taste: chorda tympani branch of the facial nerve (CN VII) via special visceral afferent fibers
  - Sensation: lingual branch of the mandibular (V3) division of the trigeminal nerve (CN V) via general visceral afferent fibers
- Posterior one third of tongue:
  - Taste and sensation: glossopharyngeal nerve (CN IX) via a mixture of special and general visceral afferent fibers
- Base of tongue
  - Taste and sensation: internal branch of the superior laryngeal nerve (itself a branch of the vagus nerve, CN X)

==== Lymphatic drainage ====
The tip of tongue drains to the submental nodes. The left and right halves of the anterior two-thirds of the tongue drains to submandibular lymph nodes, while the posterior one-third of the tongue drains to the jugulo-omohyoid nodes.

==== Microanatomy ====
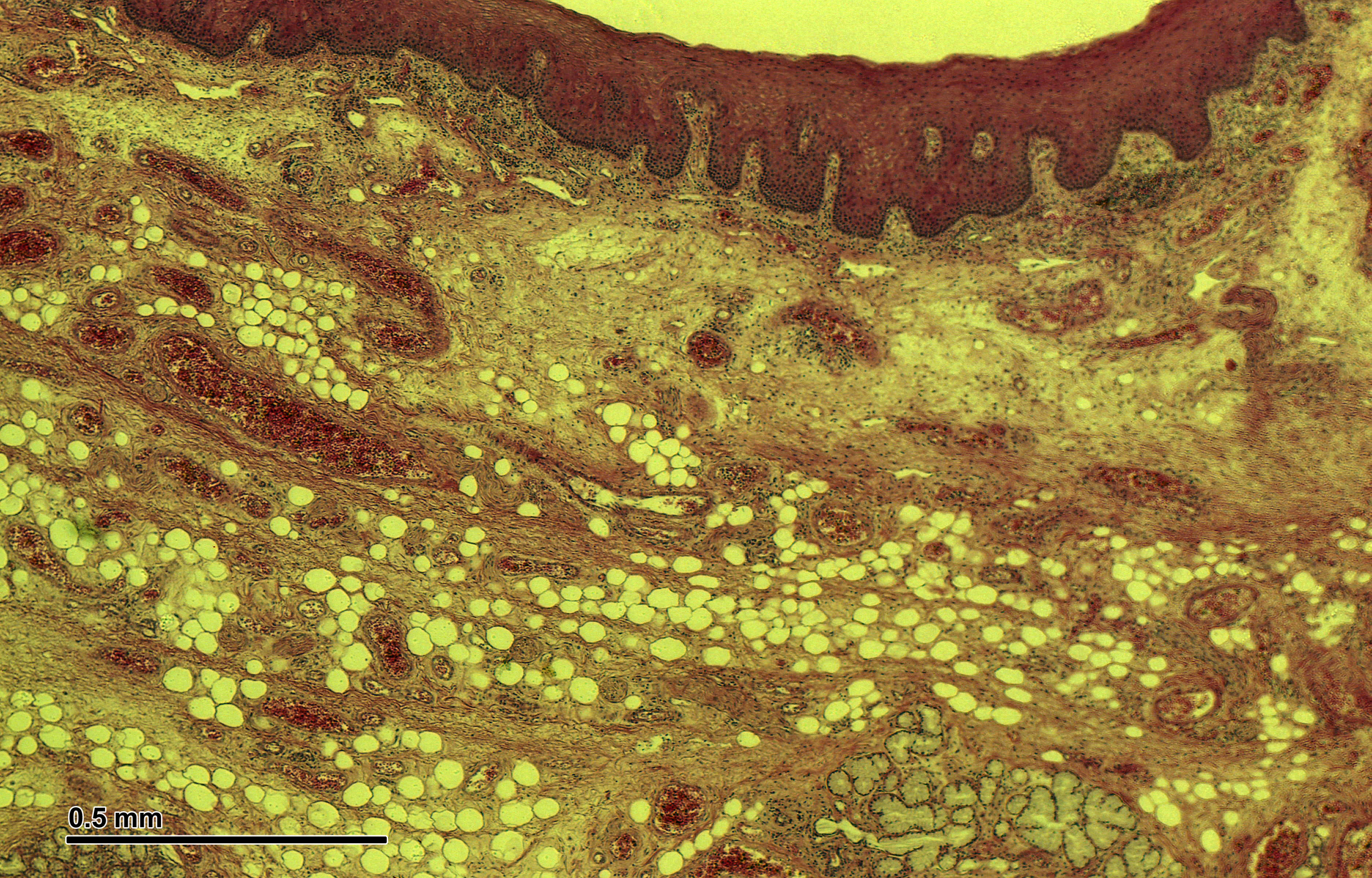
Section through the human tongue; stained H&E

The upper surface of the tongue is covered in masticatory mucosa, a type of oral mucosa, which is of keratinized stratified squamous epithelium. Embedded in this are numerous papillae, some of which house the taste buds and their taste receptors. The lingual papillae consist of filiform, fungiform, vallate and foliate papillae, and only the filiform papillae are not associated with any taste buds.

The tongue can divide itself in dorsal and ventral surface. The dorsal surface is a stratified squamous keratinized epithelium, which is characterized by numerous mucosal projections called papillae. The lingual papillae covers the dorsal side of the tongue towards the front of the terminal groove. The ventral surface is stratified squamous non-keratinized epithelium which is smooth.

=== Development ===
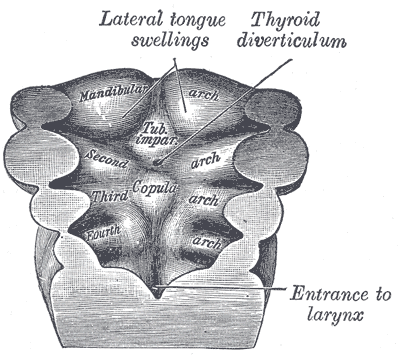
Floor of pharynx at about 26 days showing lateral swellings at first pharyngeal arch (mandibular arch)

The tongue begins to develop in the fourth week of embryonic development from a median swelling—the median tongue bud (tuberculum impar) of the first pharyngeal arch.

In the fifth week a pair of lateral lingual swellings, one on the right side and one on the left, form on the first pharyngeal arch. These lingual swellings quickly expand and cover the median tongue bud. They form the anterior part of the tongue that makes up two-thirds of the length of the tongue, and continue to develop through prenatal development. The line of their fusion is marked by the median sulcus.

In the fourth week, a swelling appears from the second pharyngeal arch, in the midline, called the copula. During the fifth and sixth weeks, the copula is overgrown by a swelling from the third and fourth arches (mainly from the third arch) called the hypopharyngeal eminence, and this develops into the posterior part of the tongue (the other third and the posterior most part of the tongue is developed from the fourth pharyngeal arch). The hypopharyngeal eminence develops mainly by the growth of endoderm from the third pharyngeal arch. The boundary between the two parts of the tongue, the anterior from the first arch and the posterior from the third arch is marked by the terminal sulcus. The terminal sulcus is shaped like a V with the tip of the V situated posteriorly. At the tip of the terminal sulcus is the foramen cecum, which is the point of attachment of the thyroglossal duct where the embryonic thyroid begins to descend.

=== Function ===
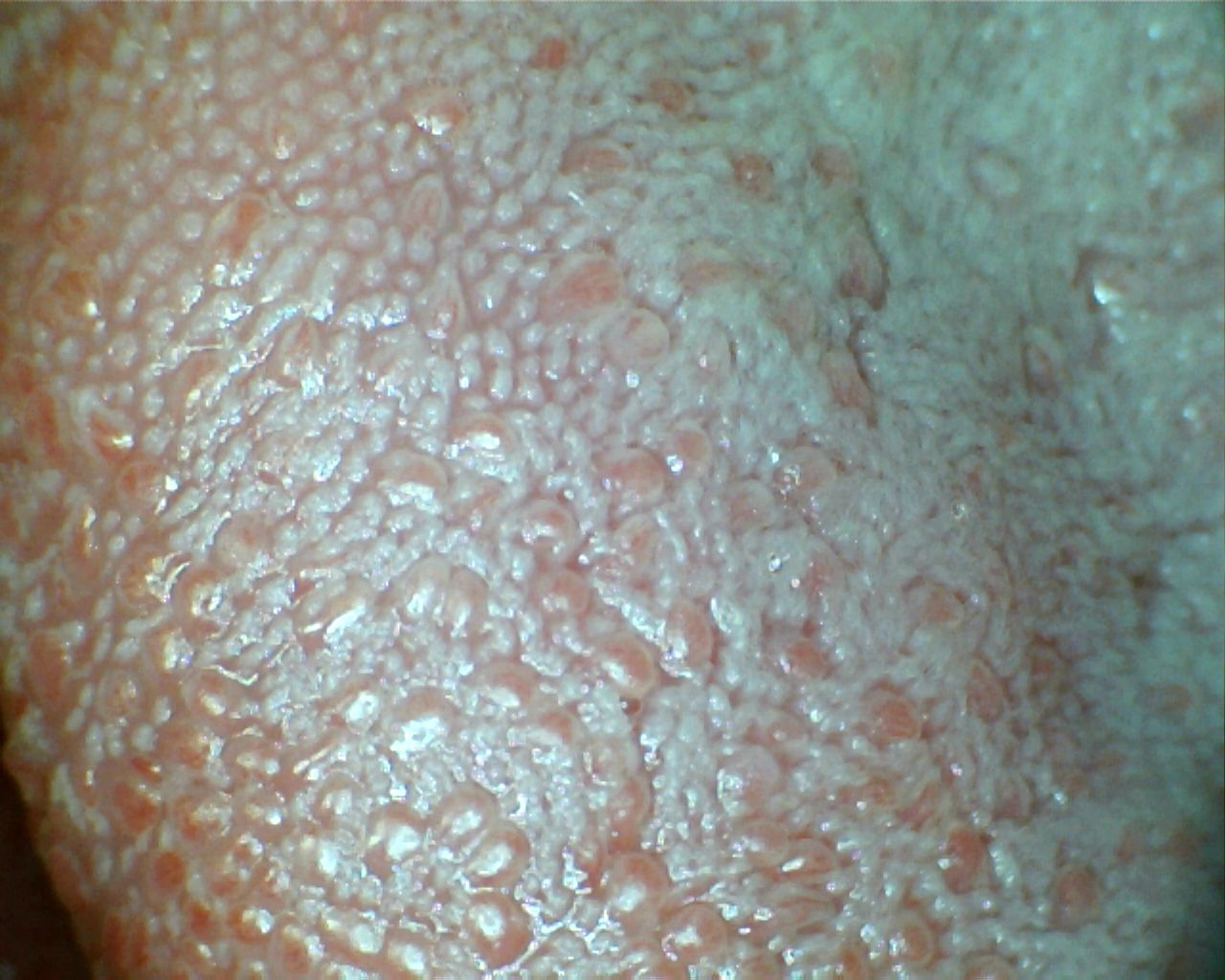
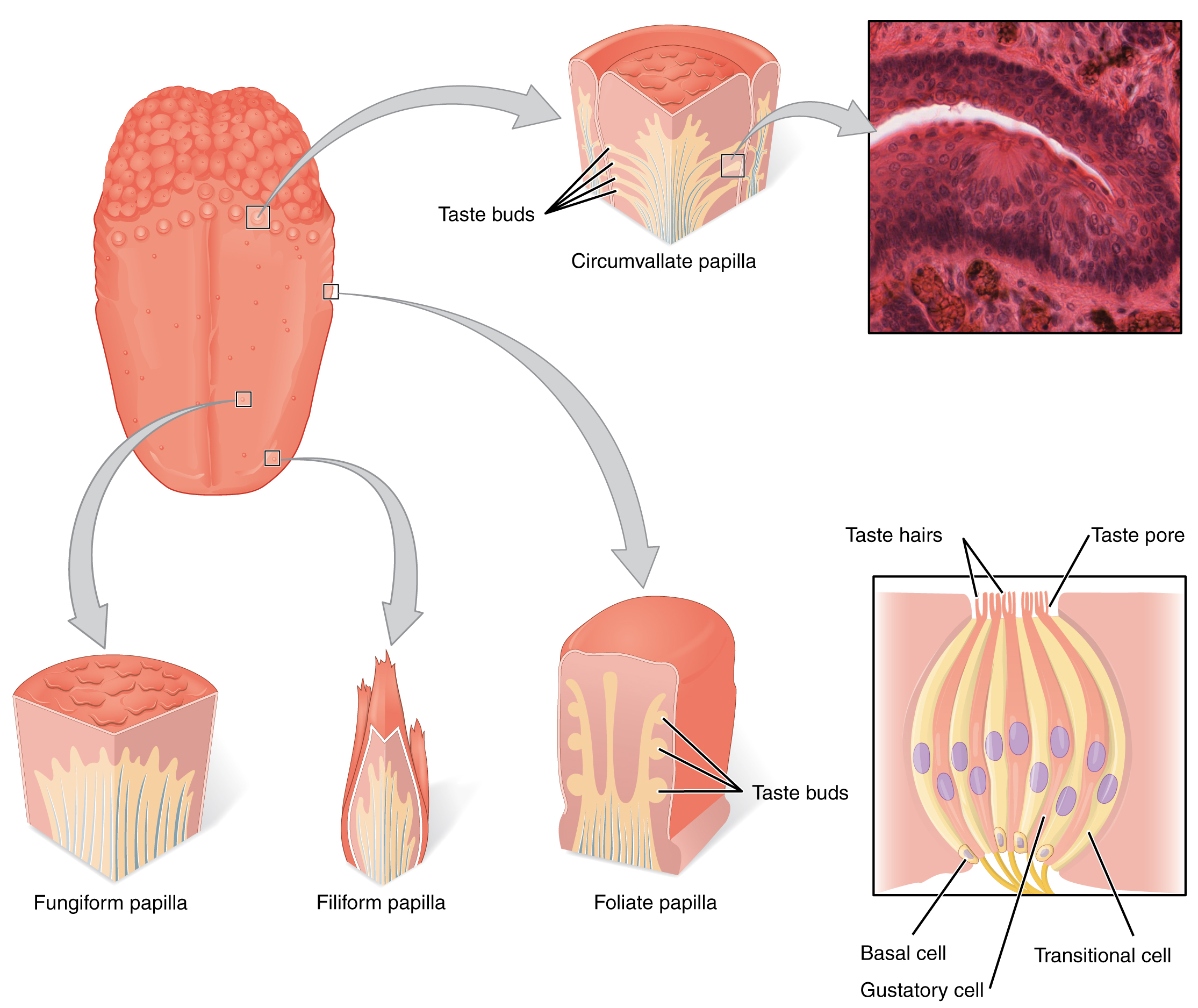
Taste receptors are present on the human tongue in papillae.

==== Taste ====
Chemicals that stimulate taste receptor cells are known as tastants. Once a tastant is dissolved in saliva, it can make contact with the plasma membrane of the gustatory hairs, which are the sites of taste transduction.

The tongue is equipped with many taste buds on its dorsal surface, and each taste bud is equipped with taste receptor cells that can sense particular classes of tastes. Distinct types of taste receptor cells respectively detect substances that are sweet, bitter, salty, sour, spicy, or taste of umami. Umami receptor cells are the least understood and accordingly are the type most intensively under research. There is a common misconception that different sections of the tongue are exclusively responsible for different basic tastes. Although widely taught in schools in the form of the tongue map, this is incorrect; all taste sensations come from all regions of the tongue, although certain parts are more sensitive to certain tastes.

==== Mastication ====
The tongue is an important accessory organ in the digestive system. The tongue is used for crushing food against the hard palate, during mastication and manipulation of food for softening prior to swallowing. The epithelium on the tongue's upper, or dorsal surface is keratinised. Consequently, the tongue can grind against the hard palate without being itself damaged or irritated.

==== Speech ====
The tongue is one of the primary articulators in the production of speech, and this is facilitated by both the extrinsic muscles that move the tongue and the intrinsic muscles that change its shape. Specifically, different vowels are articulated by changing the tongue's height and retraction to alter the resonant properties of the vocal tract. These resonant properties amplify specific harmonic frequencies (formants) that are different for each vowel, while attenuating other harmonics. For example, [a] is produced with the tongue lowered and centered and [i] is produced with the tongue raised and fronted. Consonants are articulated by constricting airflow through the vocal tract, and many consonants feature a constriction between the tongue and some other part of the vocal tract. For example, alveolar consonants like [s] and [n] are articulated with the tongue against the alveolar ridge, while velar consonants like [k] and [g] are articulated with the tongue dorsum against the soft palate (velum). Tongue shape is also relevant to speech articulation, for example in retroflex consonants, where the tip of the tongue is curved backward.

==== Intimacy ====
The tongue plays a role in physical intimacy and sexuality. The tongue is part of the erogenous zone of the mouth and can be used in intimate contact, as in the French kiss and in oral sex.

=== Clinical significance ===
==== Disease ====
A congenital disorder of the tongue is that of ankyloglossia also known as tongue-tie. The tongue is tied to the floor of the mouth by a very short and thickened frenulum and this affects speech, eating, and swallowing.

The tongue is prone to several pathologies including glossitis and other inflammations such as geographic tongue, and median rhomboid glossitis; burning mouth syndrome, oral hairy leukoplakia, oral candidiasis (thrush), black hairy tongue, bifid tongue (due to failure in fusion of two lingual swellings of first pharyngeal arch) and fissured tongue.

There are several types of oral cancer that mainly affect the tongue. Mostly these are squamous cell carcinomas.

Food debris, desquamated epithelial cells and bacteria often form a visible tongue coating. This coating has been identified as a major factor contributing to bad breath (halitosis), which can be managed by using a tongue cleaner.

==== Medication delivery ====
The sublingual region underneath the front of the tongue is an ideal location for the administration of certain medications into the body. The oral mucosa is very thin underneath the tongue, and is underlain by a plexus of veins. The sublingual route takes advantage of the highly vascular quality of the oral cavity, and allows for the speedy application of medication into the cardiovascular system, bypassing the gastrointestinal tract. This is the only convenient and efficacious route of administration (apart from Intravenous therapy) of nitroglycerin to a patient suffering chest pain from angina pectoris.

== Other animals ==
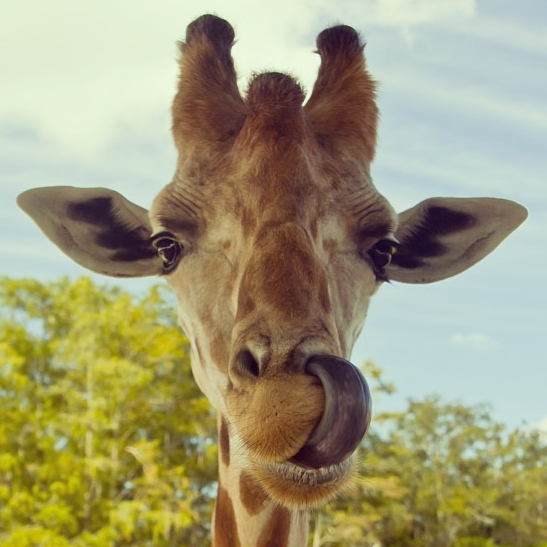
Giraffe's tongue

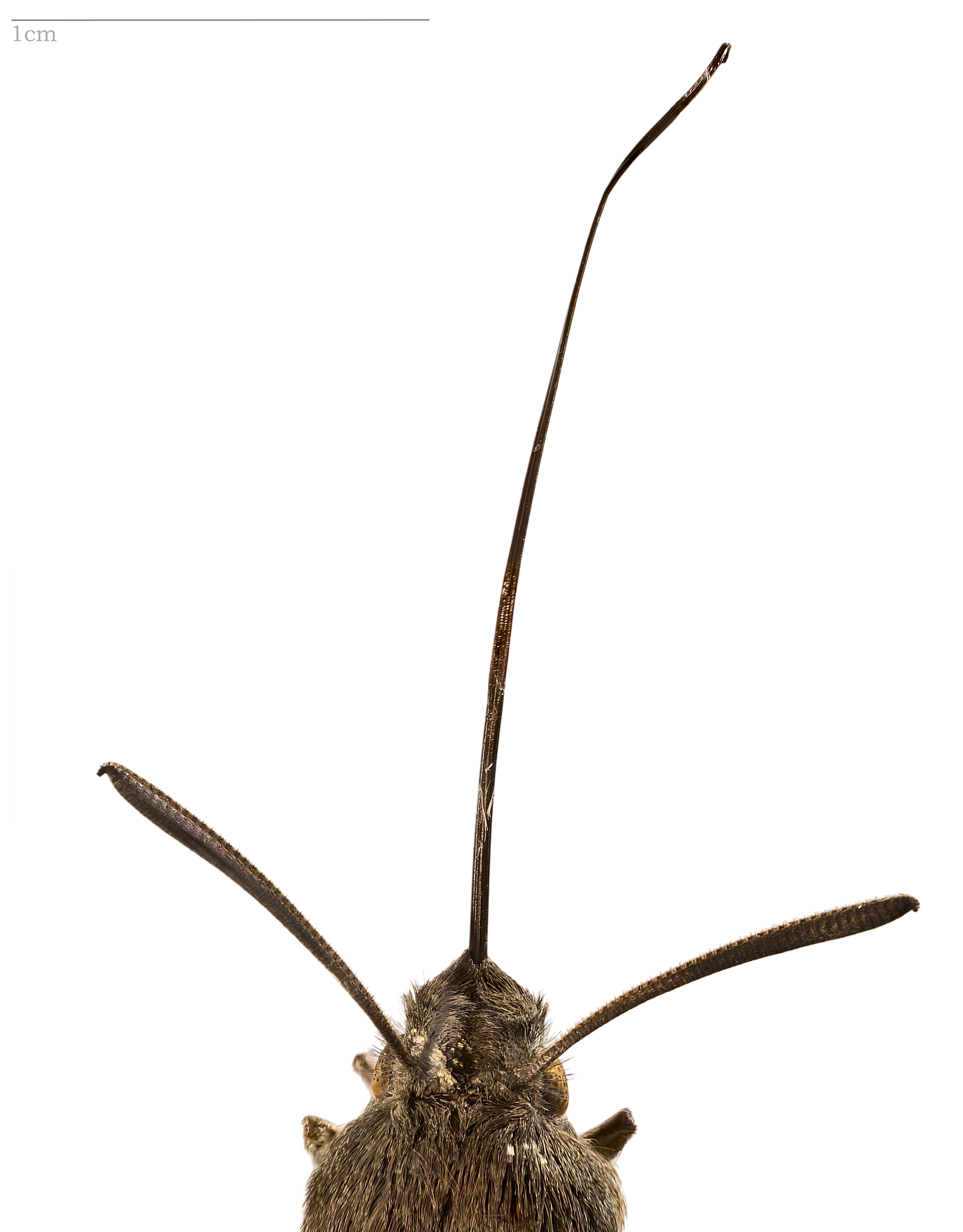
Extended proboscis of a long tongued Macroglossum moth

The muscles of the tongue evolved in amphibians from occipital somites. Most amphibians show a proper tongue after their metamorphosis. As a consequence, most tetrapod animals—amphibians, reptiles, birds, and mammals—have tongues (the frog family of pipids lack tongue). In mammals such as dogs and cats, the tongue is often used to clean the fur and body by licking. The tongues of these species have a very rough texture, which allows them to remove oils and parasites. Some dogs have a tendency to consistently lick a part of their foreleg, which can result in a skin condition known as a lick granuloma. A dog's tongue also acts as a heat regulator. As a dog increases its exercise the tongue will increase in size due to greater blood flow. The tongue hangs out of the dog's mouth and the moisture on the tongue will work to cool the bloodflow.

Some animals have tongues that are specially adapted for catching prey. For example, chameleons, frogs, pangolins and anteaters have prehensile tongues.

Other animals may have organs that are analogous to tongues, such as a butterfly's proboscis or a radula on a mollusc, but these are not homologous with the tongues found in vertebrates and often have little resemblance in function. For example, butterflies do not lick with their proboscides; they suck through them, and the proboscis is not a single organ, but two jaws held together to form a tube. Many species of fish have small folds at the base of their mouths that might informally be called tongues, but they lack a muscular structure like the true tongues found in most tetrapods.

== Society and culture ==
=== Figures of speech ===
The tongue can serve as a metonym for language. For example, the New Testament of the Bible, in the Book of Acts of the Apostles, Jesus' disciples on the Day of Pentecost received a type of spiritual gift: "there appeared unto them cloven tongues like as of fire, and it sat upon each of them. And they were all filled with the Holy Ghost, and began to speak with other tongues ....", which amazed the crowd of Jewish people in Jerusalem, who were from various parts of the Roman Empire but could now understand what was being preached. The phrase mother tongue is used as a child's first language. Many languages have the same word for "tongue" and "language", as did the English language before the Middle Ages.

A common temporary failure in word retrieval from memory is referred to as the tip-of-the-tongue phenomenon. The expression tongue in cheek refers to a statement that is not to be taken entirely seriously—something said or done with subtle ironic or sarcastic humour. A tongue twister is a phrase very difficult to pronounce. Aside from being a medical condition, "tongue-tied" means being unable to say what you want due to confusion or restriction. The phrase "cat got your tongue" refers to when a person is speechless. To "bite one's tongue" is a phrase which describes holding back an opinion to avoid causing offence. A "slip of the tongue" refers to an unintentional utterance, such as a Freudian slip. The "gift of tongues" refers to when one is uncommonly gifted to be able to speak in a foreign language, often as a type of spiritual gift. Speaking in tongues is a common phrase used to describe glossolalia, which is to make smooth, language-resembling sounds that is no true spoken language itself. A deceptive person is said to have a forked tongue, and a smooth-talking person is said to have a silver tongue.

=== Gestures ===
Sticking one's tongue out at someone is considered a childish gesture of rudeness or defiance in many countries; the act may also have sexual connotations, depending on the way in which it is done. However, in Tibet it is considered a greeting. In 2009, a farmer from Fabriano, Italy, was convicted and fined by Italy's highest court for sticking his tongue out at a neighbor with whom he had been arguing—proof of the affront had been captured with a cell-phone camera.

=== Body art ===
Tongue piercing and splitting have become more common in western countries in recent decades. One study found that one-fifth of young adults in Israel had at least one type of oral piercing, most commonly the tongue.

=== Representational art ===
Protruding tongues appear in the art of several Polynesian cultures.

=== As food ===
The tongues of some animals are consumed and sometimes prized as delicacies. Hot-tongue sandwiches frequently appear on menus in kosher delicatessens in America. Taco de lengua (lengua being Spanish for tongue) is a taco filled with beef tongue, and is especially popular in Mexican cuisine. As part of Colombian gastronomy, Tongue in Sauce (Lengua en Salsa) is a dish prepared by frying the tongue and adding tomato sauce, onions and salt. Tongue can also be prepared as birria. Pig and beef tongue are consumed in Chinese cuisine. Duck tongues are sometimes employed in Sichuan dishes, while lamb's tongue is occasionally employed in Continental and contemporary American cooking. Fried cod tongue is a relatively common part of fish meals in Norway and in Newfoundland. In Argentina and Uruguay cow tongue is cooked and served in vinegar (lengua a la vinagreta). In the Czech Republic and in Poland, a pork tongue is considered a delicacy, and there are many ways of preparing it. In Eastern Slavic countries, pork and beef tongues are commonly consumed, boiled and garnished with horseradish or jellied; beef tongues fetch a significantly higher price and are considered more of a delicacy. In Alaska, cow tongues are among the more common. Both cow and moose tongues are popular toppings on open-top-sandwiches in Norway, the latter usually amongst hunters.

Tongues of seals and whales have been eaten, sometimes in large quantities, by sealers and whalers, and in various times and places have been sold for food on shore.

== Gallery ==
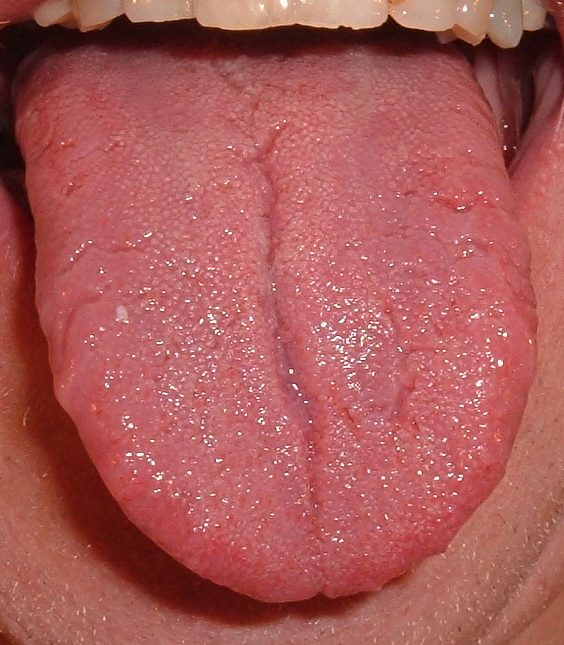
Human tongue

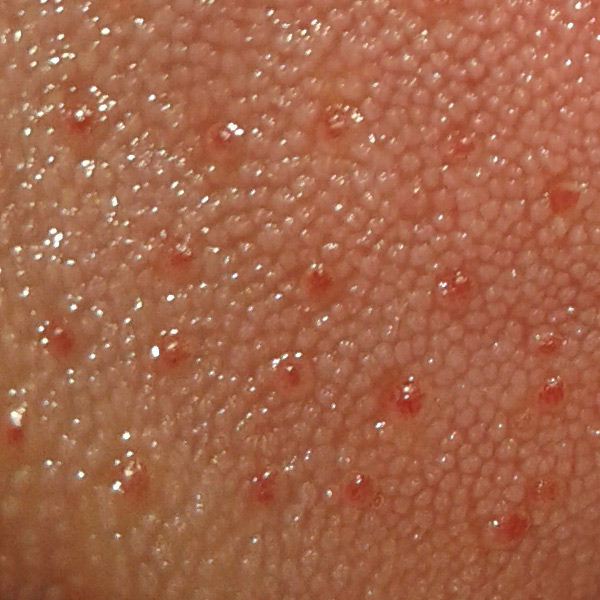
Spots on the tongue

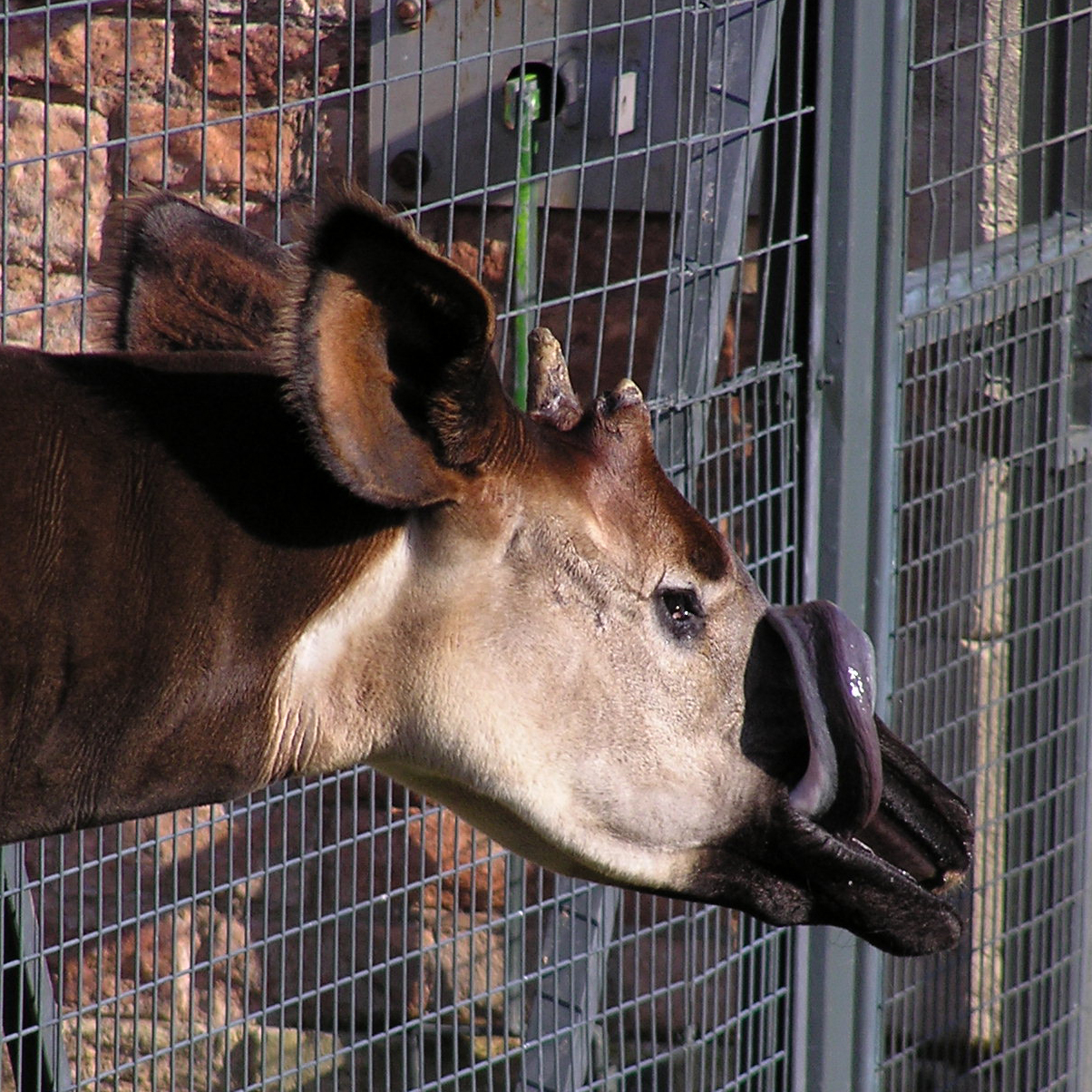
An okapi cleaning its muzzle with its tongue

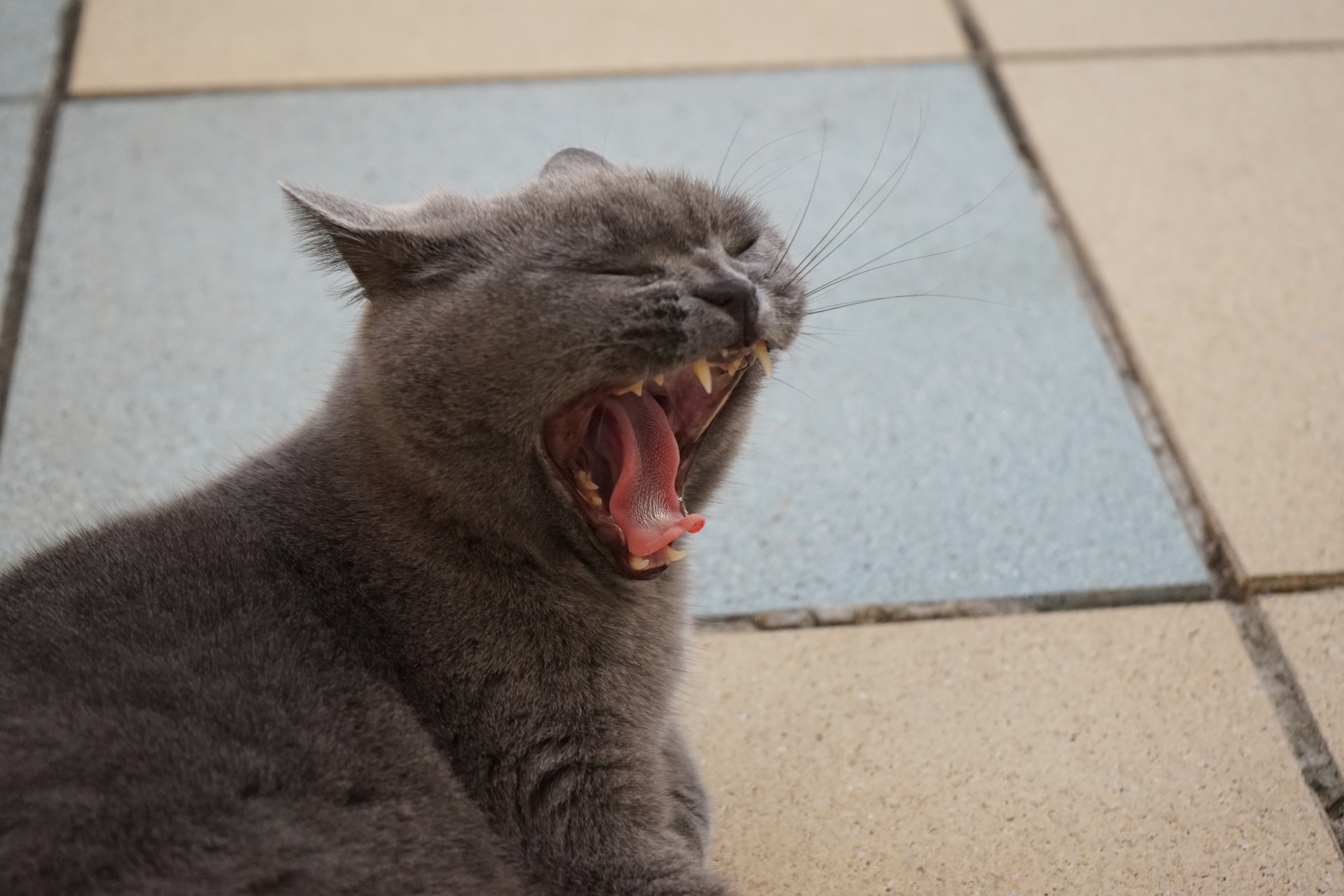
A yawning cat's tongue is comb-like

== See also ==
- Electronic tongue
- Tongue map
- Vocal tract
