= Nasal spine =

The nasal spine (spina nasalis) may refer to:

- Anterior nasal spine (spina nasalis anterior maxillae)
- Posterior nasal spine (spina nasalis posterior ossis palatini)
