= Pharyngeal branch =

Pharyngeal branch can refer to any one of several different structures near the pharynx:

- Nerves
  - Pharyngeal branch of vagus nerve - "ramus pharyngeus nervi vagi"
  - Pharyngeal branches of recurrent laryngeal nerve - "rami pharyngei nervi laryngei recurrentis"
  - Pharyngeal branches of glossopharyngeal nerve - "rami pharyngei nervi glossopharyngei"
  - Pharyngeal nerve of pterygopalatine ganglion
- Arteries
  - Pharyngeal branches of ascending pharyngeal artery - "rami pharyngeales arteriae pharyngeae ascendentis"
  - Pharyngeal branch of artery of pterygoid canal - "ramus pharyngeus arteriae canalis pterygoidei"
  - Pharyngeal branch of maxillary artery
  - Pharyngeal branches of inferior thyroid artery - "rami pharyngeales arteriae thyroideae inferioris"
