= Pharyngeal plexus =

Nerve fibers innervating most of the palate and pharynx

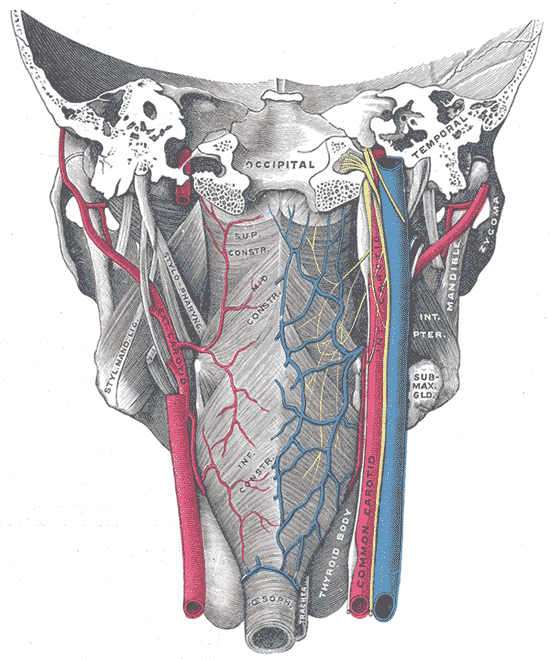
- Muscles of the pharynx, viewed from behind, together with the associated vessels and nerves. (Pharyngeal plexus visible but not labeled.)

Details

Identifiers
- Latin: plexus pharyngeus

The pharyngeal plexus is a nerve plexus located upon the outer surface of the pharynx. It contains a motor component (derived from the vagus nerve (cranial nerve X)), a sensory component (derived from the glossopharyngeal nerve (cranial nerve IX)), and sympathetic component (derived from the superior cervical ganglion).

The plexus provides motor innervation to most muscles of the soft palate (all but the tensor veli palatini muscle) and most muscles of the pharynx (all but the stylopharyngeus muscle). The larynx meanwhile receives motor innervation from the vagus nerve (CN X) via its external branch of the superior laryngeal nerve and its recurrent laryngeal nerve, and not through the pharyngeal plexus.

== Anatomy ==
The pharyngeal plexus occurs upon the outer surface of the pharynx - especially superficial to the middle pharyngeal constrictor muscle.

=== Afferents ===
It has the following components:

- Motor – pharyngeal branch of vagus nerve (CN X) which arises from the superior portion of the inferior ganglion of vagus nerve, with the neuron cell bodies of its axons residing in the nucleus ambiguus. The pharyngeal branch ramifies upon reaching the superior border of the middle pharyngeal constrictor muscle. It is unclear whether the cranial root of accessory nerve (CN XI)
- Sensory – pharyngeal branches of glossopharyngeal nerve.
- Sympathetic vasomotor – efferent fibres of the superior cervical ganglion.

Because the cranial part of accessory nerve (CN XI) leaves the jugular foramen as a part of the CN X, it is sometimes considered part of the plexus as well.

=== Efferents/distribution ===
En route to their target tissues, outgoing fibres from the pharyngeal plexus at first either ascend upon the superior pharyngeal constrictor muscle or descend upon the inferior pharyngeal constrictor muscle, then ramify within the pharyngeal muscular layer and mucous membrane.

==== Motor ====
Fibers from CN X innervate all the muscles of the pharynx (except stylopharyngeus, which is innervated directly by a branch of CN IX). This includes an outer circular layer of three constrictor muscles (superior, middle, inferior) that propel food downwards and an inner longitudinal layer (stylopharyngeus, salpingopharyngeus, palatopharyngeus) that elevate the larynx and shorten the pharynx during swallowing.

In addition to the muscles of the pharynx, the pharyngeal plexus also innervates all of the muscles of the nearby soft palate (except tensor veli palatini), including the levator veli palatini, musculus uvulae, palatoglossus, and palatopharyngeus.

==== Sensory ====
The pharyngeal plexus provides sensory innervation to most of the pharynx; it provides sensory innervation to the oropharynx and laryngopharynx from CN IX and CN X. (The nasopharynx above the pharyngotympanic tube and the torus tubarius is innervated by CN V_{2}).

== See also ==
- Superior cervical ganglion

== Additional images ==
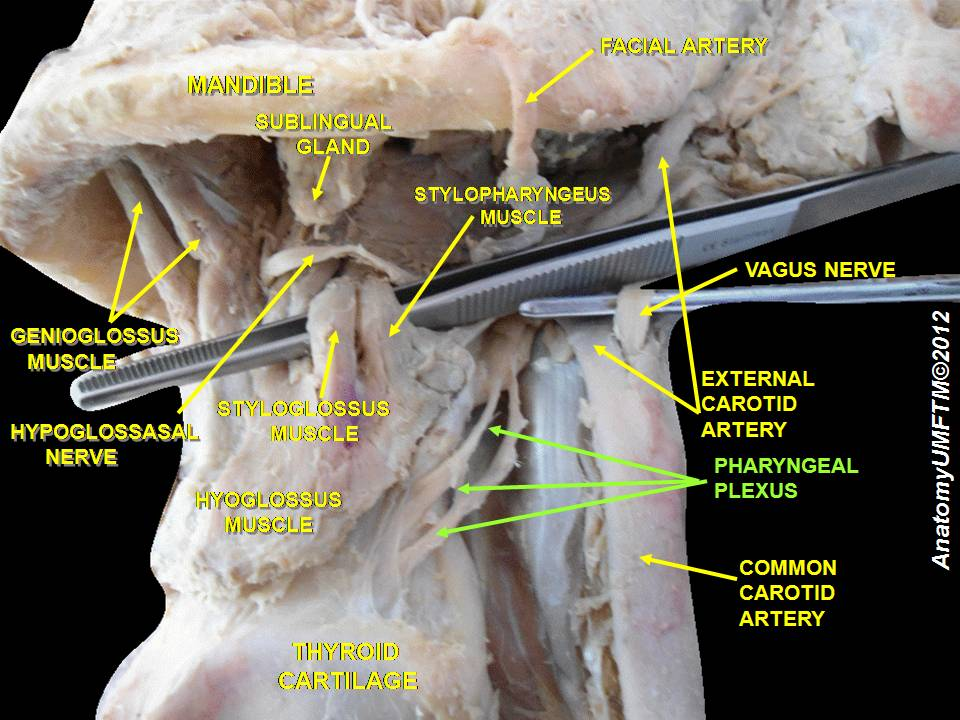
Pharyngeal plexus

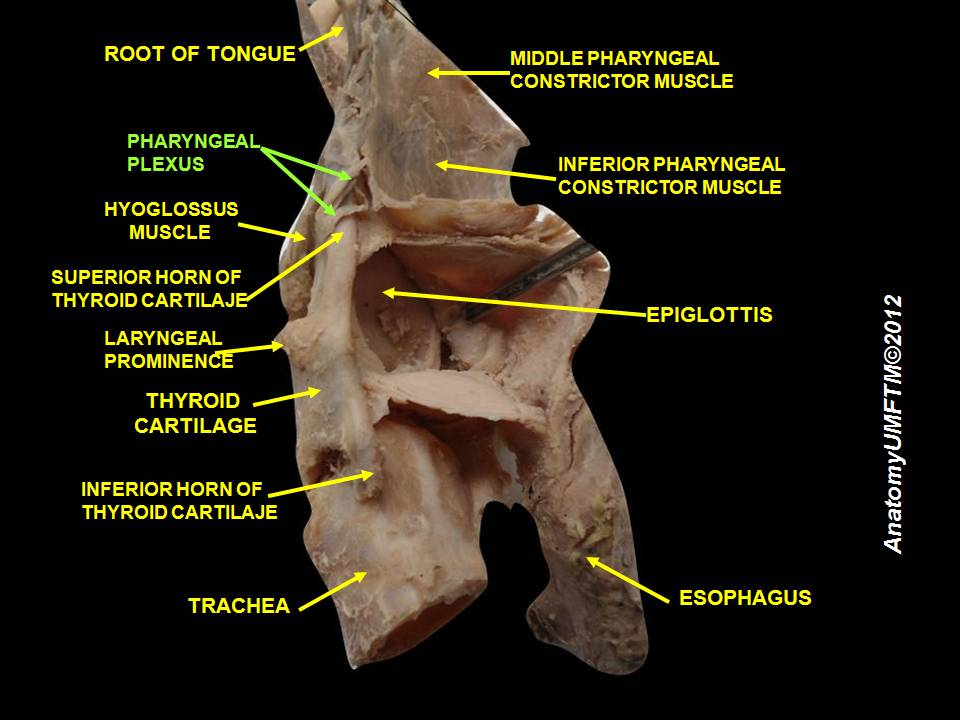
Pharyngeal plexus
