= Anterior nasal =

Anterior nasal may refer to:

- Anterior nasal aperture
- Anterior nasal spine
