= Horizontal plate of palatine bone =

Part of the facial skeleton

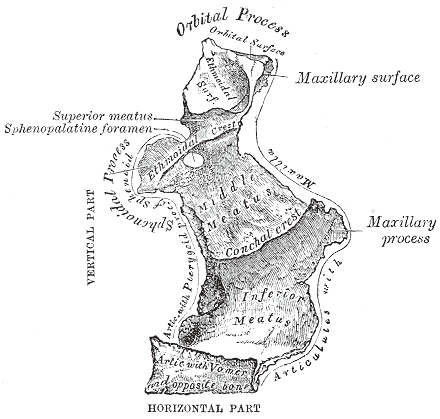
- Left palatine bone. Nasal aspect. Enlarged.

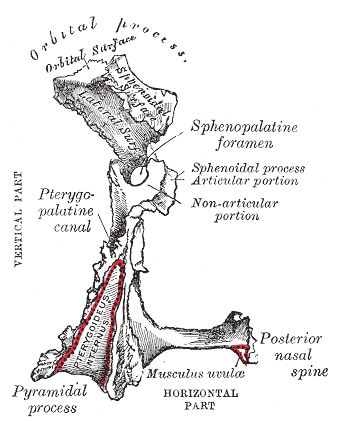
- Left palatine bone. Posterior aspect. Enlarged.

Details

Identifiers
- Latin: pars horizontalis
- TA98: A02.1.13.013
- TA2: 811
- FMA: 52901

The horizontal plate of palatine bone is a quadrilateral part of the palatine bone, and has two surfaces and four borders.

== Surfaces ==
The superior surface, concave from side to side, forms the back part of the floor of the nasal cavity.

The inferior surface, slightly concave and rough, forms, with the corresponding surface of the opposite bone, the posterior fourth of the hard palate. Near its posterior margin may be seen a more or less marked transverse ridge for the attachment of part of the aponeurosis of the tensor veli palatini.

== Borders ==
The anterior border is serrated. It articulates with the palatine process of maxilla.

The posterior border is concave, free, and serves for the attachment of the soft palate. Its medial end is sharp and pointed, and, when united with that of the opposite bone, forms a projecting process, the posterior nasal spine for the attachment of the musculus uvulae.

The lateral border is united with the lower margin of the perpendicular plate, and is grooved by the lower end of the greater palatine canal.

The medial border, the thickest, is serrated for articulation with its fellow of the opposite side; its superior edge is raised into a ridge, which, united with the ridge of the opposite bone, forms the nasal crest for articulation with the posterior part of the lower edge of the vomer.

== Additional images ==
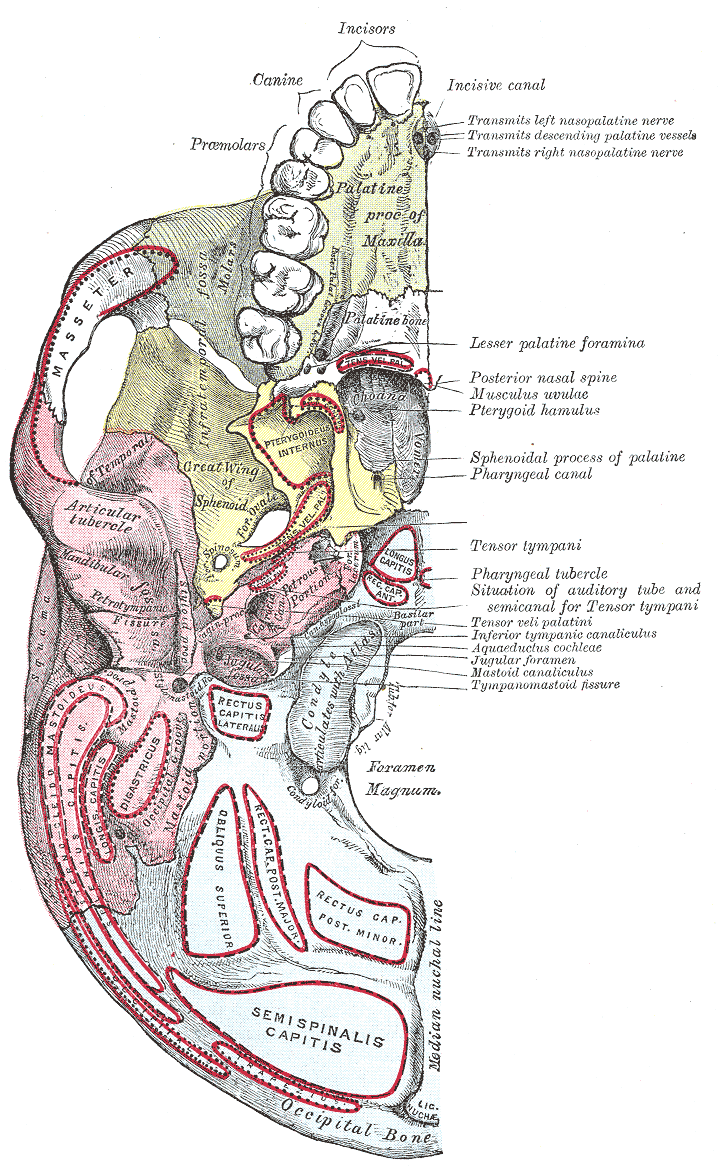
Base of skull. Inferior surface.

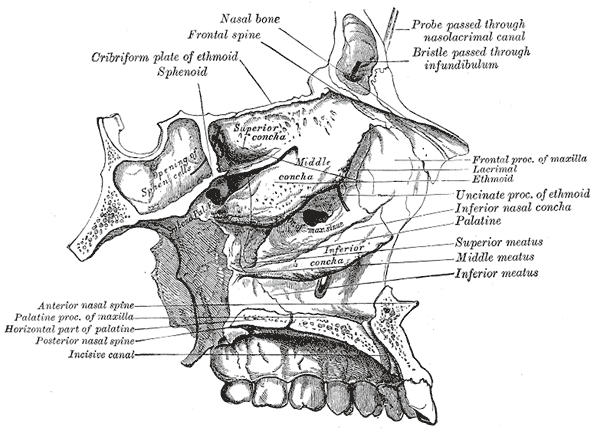
Roof, floor, and lateral wall of left nasal cavity.

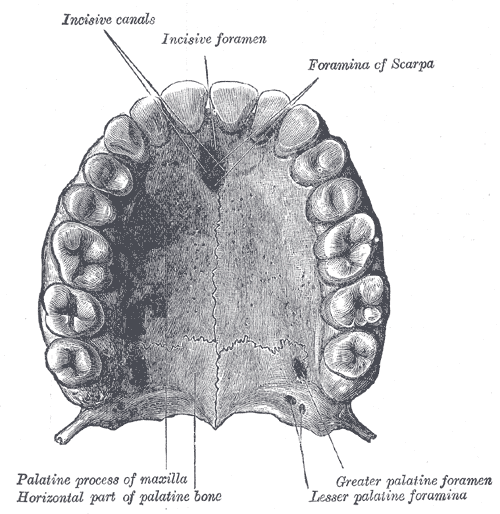
Permanent teeth of upper dental arch, seen from below.

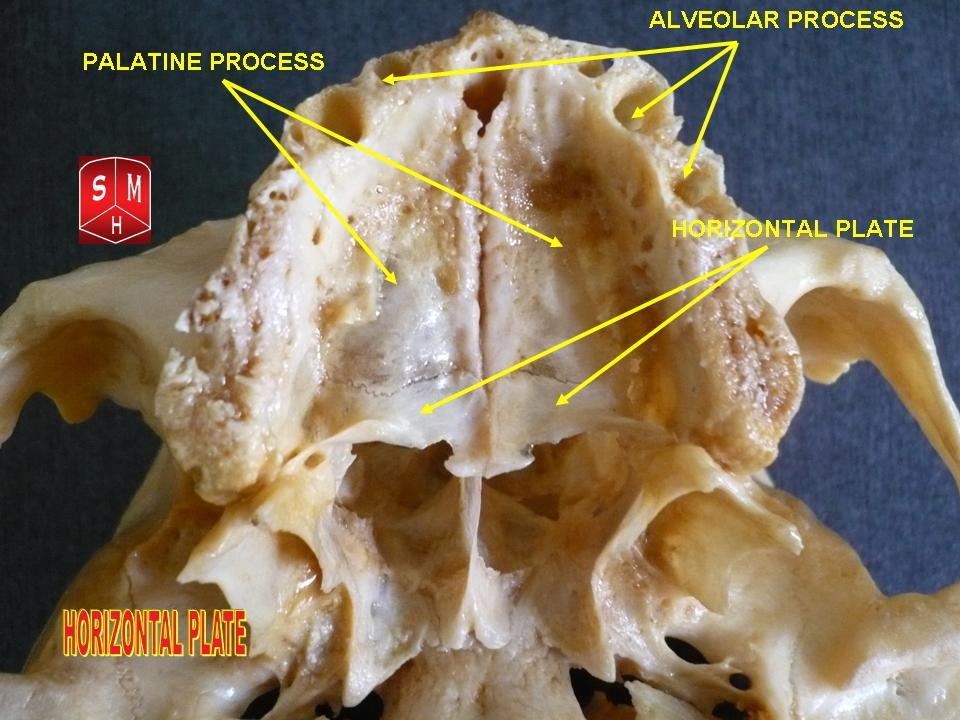
Horizontal plate
