= Velotrace =

The Velotrace, first described in 1987, is a mechanical device that monitors and records analogue data on the position of the soft palate, or velum. The device comprises two levels connected through a "push rod" that carried on a "support rod", which itself rests on the floor of the nasal cavity. The internal lever rests on the nasal surface of the soft palate, and the external lever deflects toward the speaker when the internal level deflects upwards. Changes in position and motion are monitored and can be recorded with an optoelectronic camera and a tape recorder.

The Velotrace can provide information about the pattern, timing, and coordination of movement of the soft palate during speech and swallowing.
