= Hypopharyngeal eminence =

Stage of the development of the tongue

Details

Identifiers
- Latin: eminentia hypopharyngea
- TE: eminence_by_E5.4.1.2.0.0.12 E5.4.1.2.0.0.12

The hypopharyngeal eminence or hypobranchial eminence is a midline swelling of the third and fourth pharyngeal arches, in the development of the tongue. It appears in the fifth and sixth weeks of embryogenesis.

The hypopharyngeal eminence forms mostly from the endoderm of the third pharyngeal arch and only partially from the fourth pharyngeal arch. It quickly grows to cover the copula formed earlier from the second pharyngeal arch, and will form the posterior one third of the tongue.
