= Pharyngeal branches of glossopharyngeal nerve =

Nerve filaments in the face

Details
- From: glossopharyngeal nerve
- To: pharyngeal plexus

Identifiers
- Latin: rami pharyngei nervi glossopharyngei
- TA98: A14.2.01.144; A14.2.01.169
- TA2: 6329
- FMA: 53486

The pharyngeal branches of the glossopharyngeal nerve are three or four filaments which unite, opposite the constrictor pharyngis medius, with the pharyngeal branches of the vagus and sympathetic, to form the pharyngeal plexus.

Branches from this plexus perforate the muscular coat of the pharynx and supply its muscles and mucous membrane.
