= Palatine aponeurosis =

Oral connective tissue

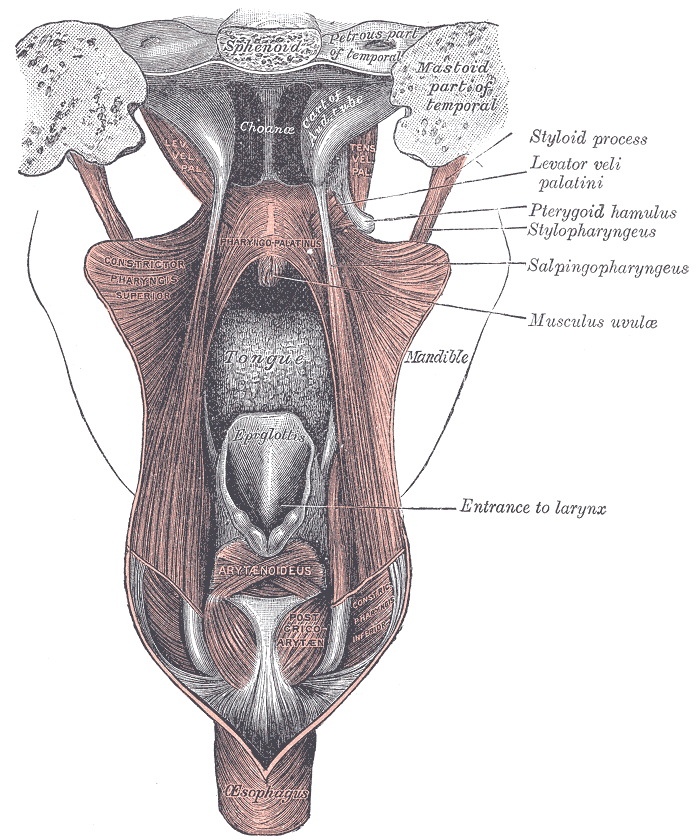
- Dissection of the muscles of the palate from behind.

Details

Identifiers
- Latin: aponeurosis palatina
- TA98: A05.2.01.101
- TA2: 2127
- FMA: 49429

The palatine aponeurosis a thin, firm, fibrous lamella which gives strength and support to soft palate. It serves as the insertion for the tensor veli palatini and levator veli palatini, and the origin for the musculus uvulae, palatopharyngeus, and palatoglossus.

The palatine aponeurosis is attached to the posterior margin of the hard palate. It is thicker anteriorly and thinner posteriorly. Posteriorly, it blends with the posterior muscular part of the soft palate. Posteroinferiorly, it presents a curved free margin from which the uvula is suspended. Laterally, it is continuous with the pharyngeal aponeurosis.

== See also ==
- Aponeurosis
