= Levator veli palatini =

Muscle of the soft palate

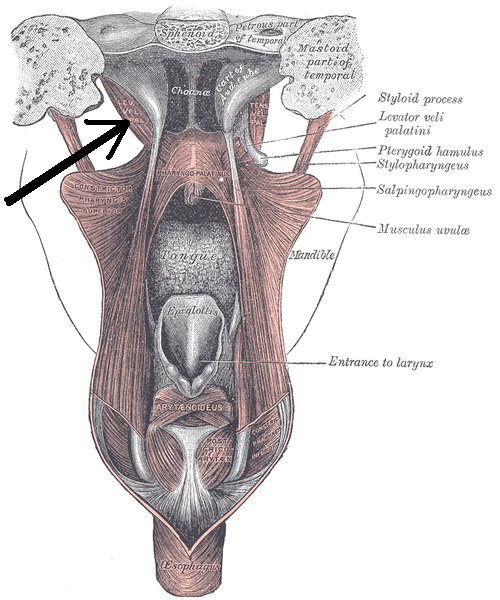
- Dissection of the muscles of the palate from behind. (Caption for Levator veli palatini visible at right, second from the top.)

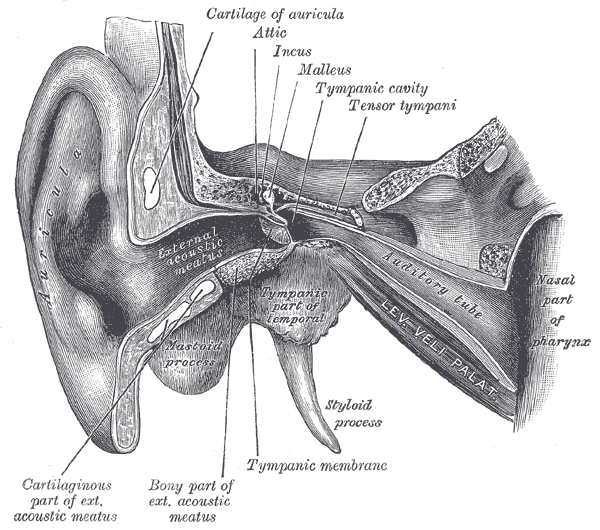
- External and middle ear, opened from the front. Right side. (Levator veli palatini visible at bottom right.)

Details
- Origin: Temporal bone, Eustachian tube
- Insertion: Palatine aponeurosis
- Artery: Facial artery
- Nerve: Pharyngeal branch of vagus (CN X)
- Actions: Elevates soft palate

Identifiers
- Latin: musculus levator veli palatini
- TA98: A05.2.01.102
- TA2: 2128
- FMA: 46727

The levator veli palatini (/lɪˈveɪtər ˈviːlaɪ ˌpæləˈtaɪnaɪ/) is a muscle of the soft palate and pharynx. It is innervated by the vagus nerve (cranial nerve X) via its pharyngeal plexus. During swallowing, it contracts, elevating the soft palate to help prevent food from entering the nasopharynx.

== Structure ==
The levator veli palatini muscle occurs in the soft palate of the mouth. It forms a sling superior and immediately posterior to the palatine aponeurosis.

=== Origin ===
The primary site of origin of the muscle is a quadrangular roughened area upon the medial extremity of the inferior aspect of the petrous part of the temporal bone; here, the muscle arises by a small tendon.

Additional fibres of the muscle arise from the inferior aspect of the cartilaginous part of pharyngotympanic tube, and the vaginal process of sphenoid bone.

=== Insertion ===
In the medial third of the soft palate, its fibers spread out between the two strands of the palatoglossus muscle to attach to the superior surface of the palatine aponeurosis and intermingle with fibres of its contralateral partner.

=== Nerve supply ===
The levator veli palatini muscle receives motor innervation from the vagus nerve (CN X) via the pharyngeal plexus.

=== Relations ===
During its course from its origin to its insertion, the muscle passes medial to the superior margin of the superior pharyngeal constrictor muscle.

It lies lateral to the choana.

=== Actions/movements ===
The primary action of the muscle is to elevate and draw posterior-ward the nearly vertical posterior portion of the soft palate; thereby, the soft palate is brought into contact with the posterior wall of the pharynx, thus creating a barrier between the nasopharynx and oropharynx.

Additionally, the muscle draws the lateral walls of the nasopharynx posteromedially, thus narrowing the nasopharynx.

== Function ==
The levator veli palatini muscle elevates the soft palate during swallowing. This helps to prevent food from entering the nasopharynx. Its action may be slightly slower than its partner, the tensor veli palatini muscle.

It has little to no effect on the pharyngotympanic tube.

== Additional images ==
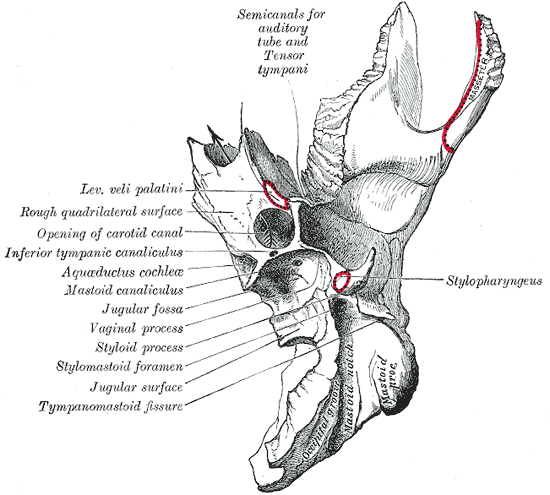
Left temporal bone. Inferior surface.
