= Posterior nasal spine =

Part of palatine bone of skull

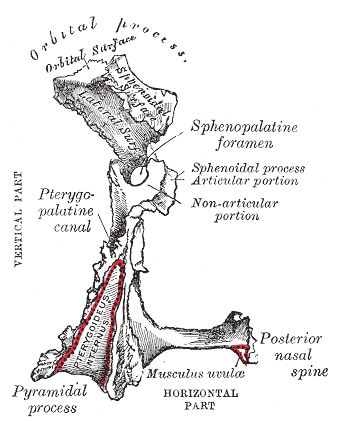
- Left palatine bone. Posterior aspect. Enlarged. (Posterior nasal spine labeled at bottom right.)

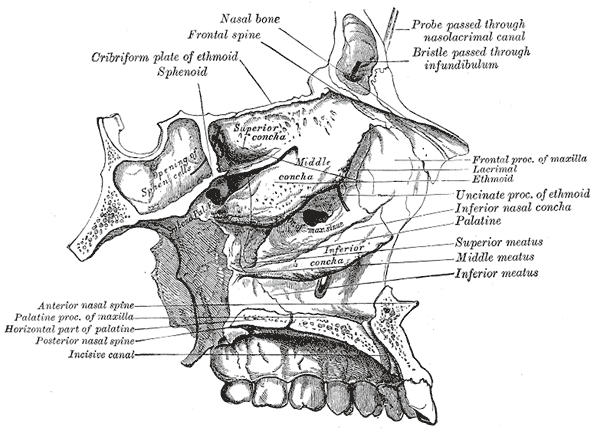
- Roof, floor, and lateral wall of left nasal cavity. (Posterior nasal spine labeled at bottom left.)

Details
- Part of: Medial end of posterior border of horizontal plate of palatine bone of skull
- System: Skeletal

Identifiers
- Latin: spina nasalis posterior ossis palatini
- TA98: A02.1.13.017
- TA2: 815
- FMA: 75776

The posterior nasal spine is part of the horizontal plate of the palatine bone of the skull. It is found at the medial end of its posterior border. It is paired with the corresponding palatine bone to form a solid spine. It is the attachment of the uvula muscle.

== Structure ==
The posterior nasal spine is found at the medial end of the posterior border of the horizontal plate of the palatine bone of the skull.

== Function ==
The posterior nasal spine is the attachment of the uvula muscle.

== Clinical applications ==
The posterior nasal spine is an important cephalometric landmark.

== Additional images ==
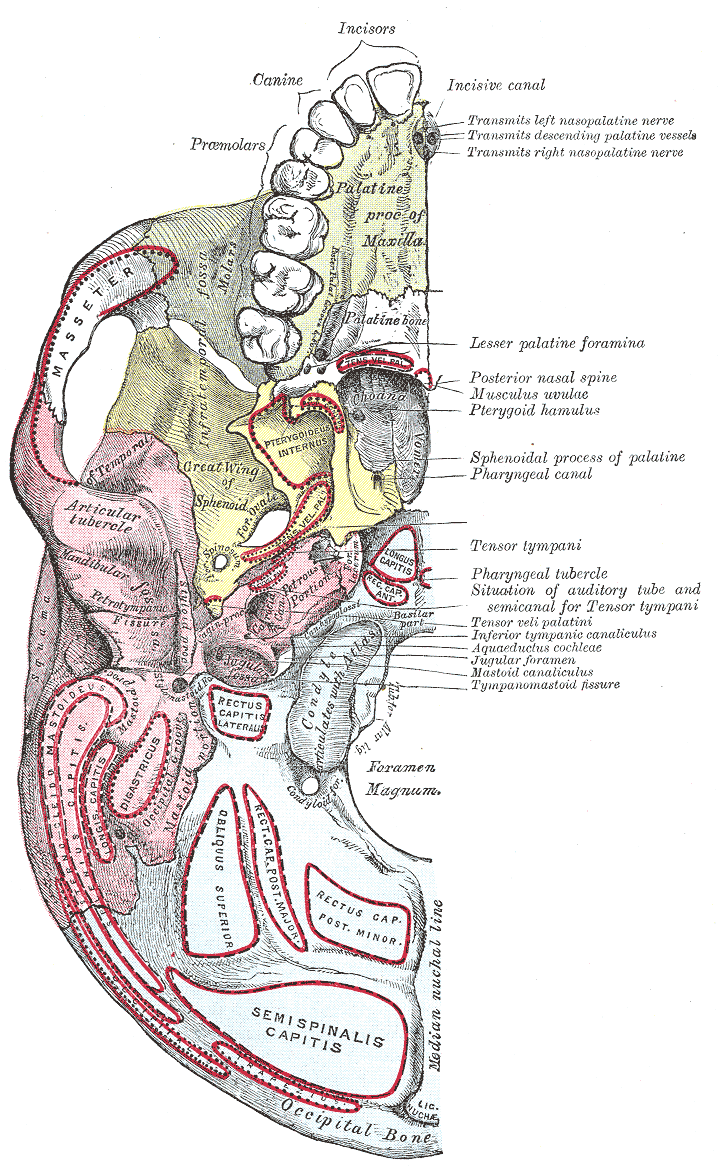
Base of skull. Inferior surface.

== See also ==
- anterior nasal spine
