= Soft palate =

Flexible part of maxilla

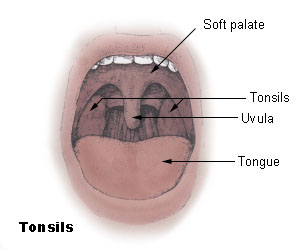

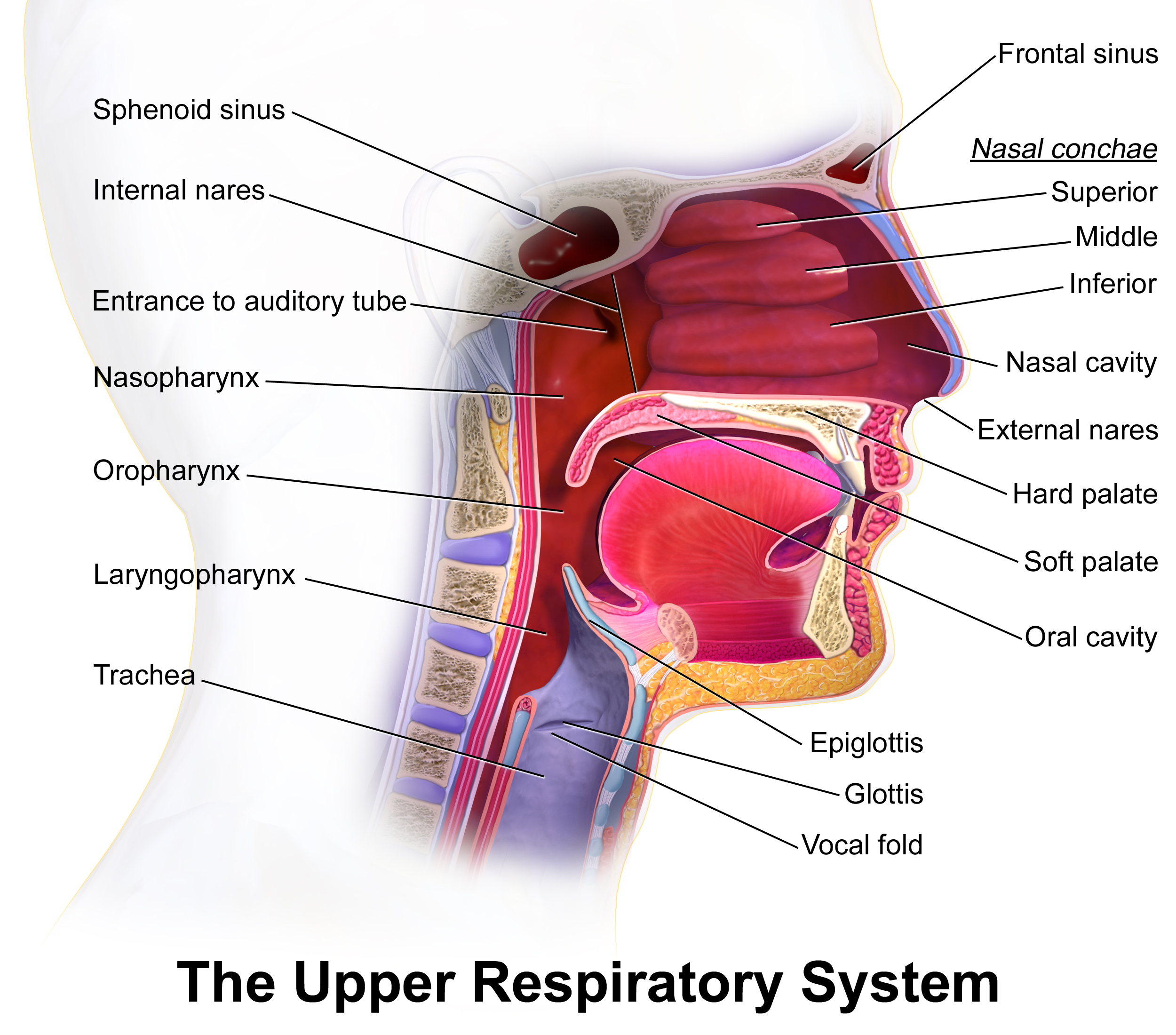
- Upper respiratory system, with soft palate labeled near center

Details
- Artery: Lesser palatine arteries, ascending palatine artery
- Nerve: Pharyngeal branch of vagus nerve, medial pterygoid nerve, lesser palatine nerves, glossopharyngeal nerve

Identifiers
- Latin: palatum molle, velum palatinum
- MeSH: D010160
- TA98: A05.1.01.104; A05.2.01.003
- TA2: 2780
- FMA: 55021

The soft palate (also known as the velum, palatal velum, or muscular palate) is, in mammals, the soft tissue constituting the back of the roof of the mouth. The soft palate is part of the palate of the mouth; the other part is the hard palate. The soft palate is distinguished from the hard palate at the front of the mouth in that it does not contain bone.

== Structure ==
=== Muscles ===
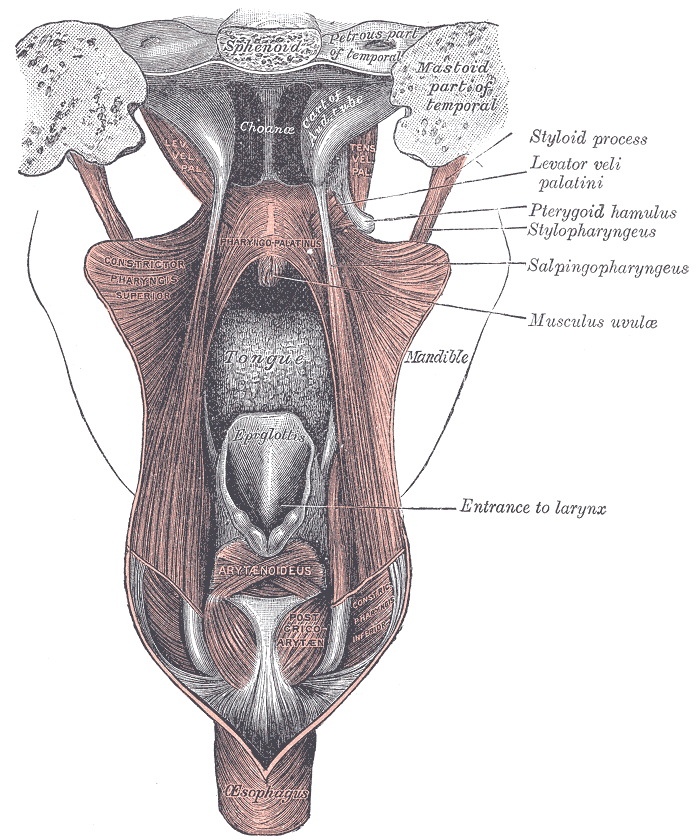
Dissection of the muscles of the palate from behind

The five muscles of the soft palate play important roles in swallowing and breathing. The muscles are:

1. Tensor veli palatini, which is involved in swallowing
2. Palatoglossus, involved in swallowing
3. Palatopharyngeus, involved in breathing
4. Levator veli palatini, involved in swallowing
5. Musculus uvulae, which moves the uvula

These muscles are innervated by the pharyngeal plexus via the vagus nerve, with the exception of the tensor veli palatini. The tensor veli palatini is innervated by the mandibular division of the trigeminal nerve (V_{3}).

== Function ==
The soft palate is moveable, consisting of muscle fibers sheathed in mucous membrane. It is responsible for closing off the nasal passages during the act of swallowing, and also for closing off the airway. During sneezing, it protects the nasal passage by diverting a portion of the excreted substance to the mouth.

In humans, the uvula hangs from the end of the soft palate. Touching the uvula or the end of the soft palate evokes a strong gag reflex in most people.

=== Speech ===
A speech sound made with the middle part of the tongue (dorsum) touching the soft palate is known as a velar consonant.

It is possible for the soft palate to retract and elevate during speech to separate the oral cavity (mouth) from the nasal cavity in order to produce the oral speech sounds. When the soft palate is lowered, air can flow freely through the nasal cavity, thus producing the nasal speech sounds, such as [m], [n] and [ŋ].

=== Modelling ===
Within the microstructure of the soft palate lie a variety of variably-oriented fibers that create a nonuniform surface with a nonuniform density distribution. The tissue has been characterized as viscoelastic, nonlinear, and anisotropic in the direction of the fibers. Young modulus values range from 585 Pa at the posterior free edge of the soft palate to 1409 Pa where the soft palate attaches to the maxilla. These properties are useful when quantifying the effects of corrective orthopedic devices such as the Hotz Plate on cleft lip.

Quantitative analyses have been done on bilateral and unilateral cleft palate to better understand geometric differences in cleft palate throughout the course of its development and correction. Despite the difficulty in finding common, comparable landmarks between normal soft palates and cleft palates, analytical methods have been devised to assess differences in degree of curvature of the alveolar crest, two-dimensional and three-dimensional surface area, and slope of the alveolar crest.

Finite element analysis has demonstrated effective modeling of soft-palate extension and movement. It has also been an effective tool for evaluating the craniofacial effects of corrective orthopedic devices and cleft lip.

== Clinical significance ==
=== Disease ===
Pathology of the soft palate includes mucosal lesions such as pemphigus vulgaris dsg - 3, herpangina and migratory stomatitis, and muscular conditions such as the congenital cleft palate and cleft uvula.

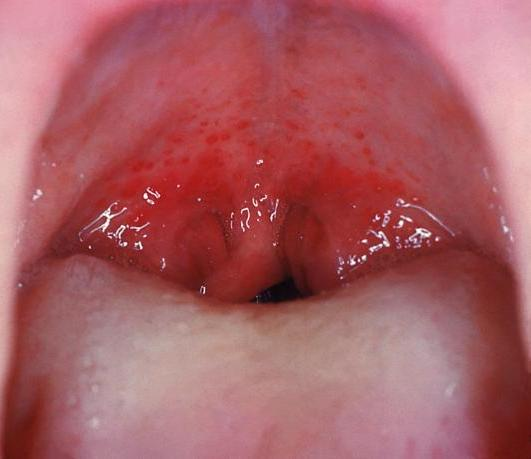
Palatal petechiae

Petechiae on the soft palate are mainly associated with streptococcal pharyngitis, and as such it is an uncommon but highly specific finding. 10 to 30 percent of palatal petechiae cases are estimated to be caused by suction, which can be habitual or secondary to fellatio.

== Additional images ==
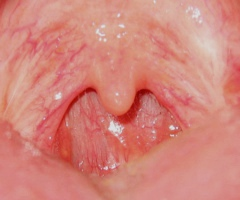
Soft palate without tonsils (after tonsillectomy)

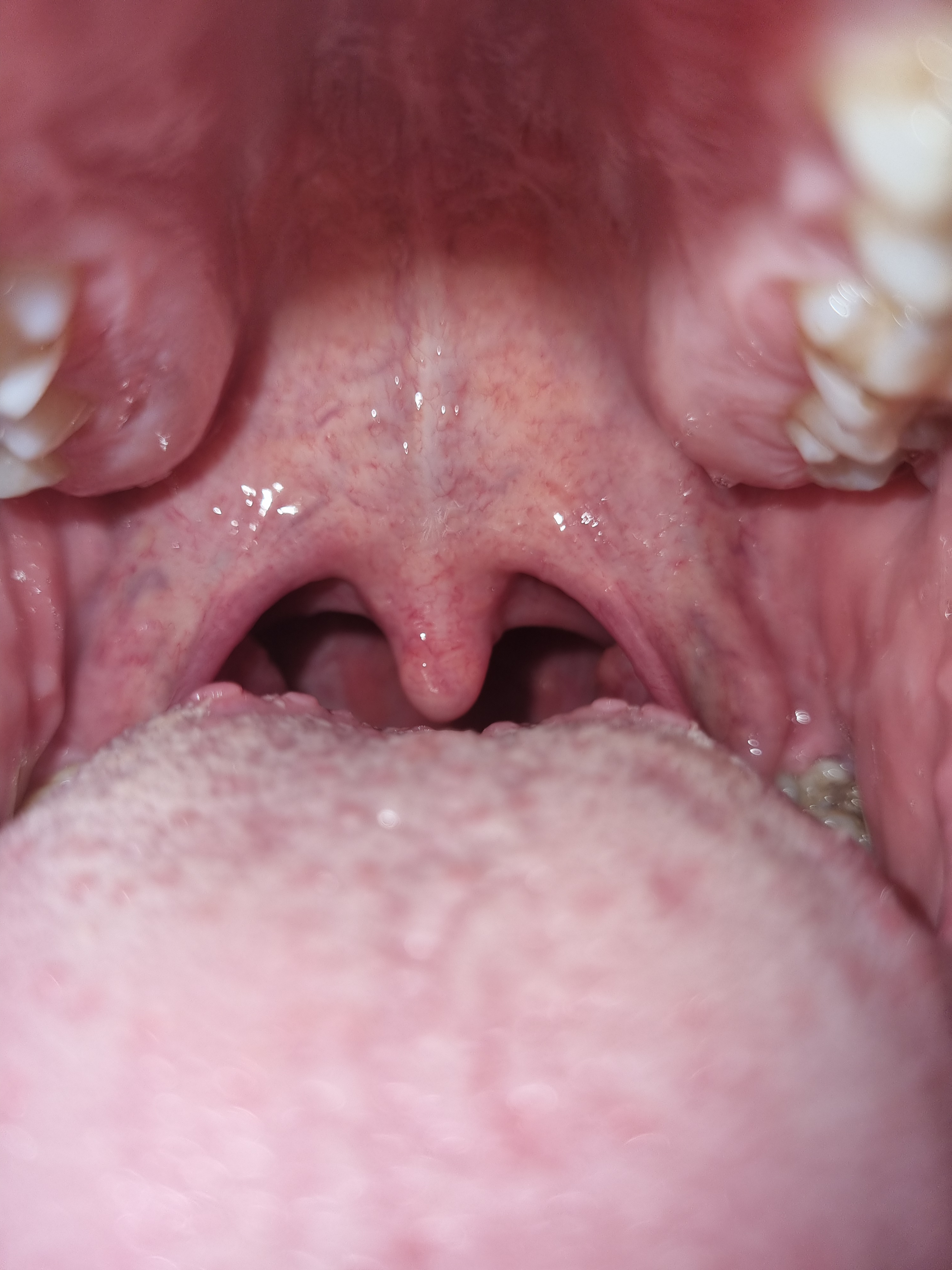
Soft palate with tonsils

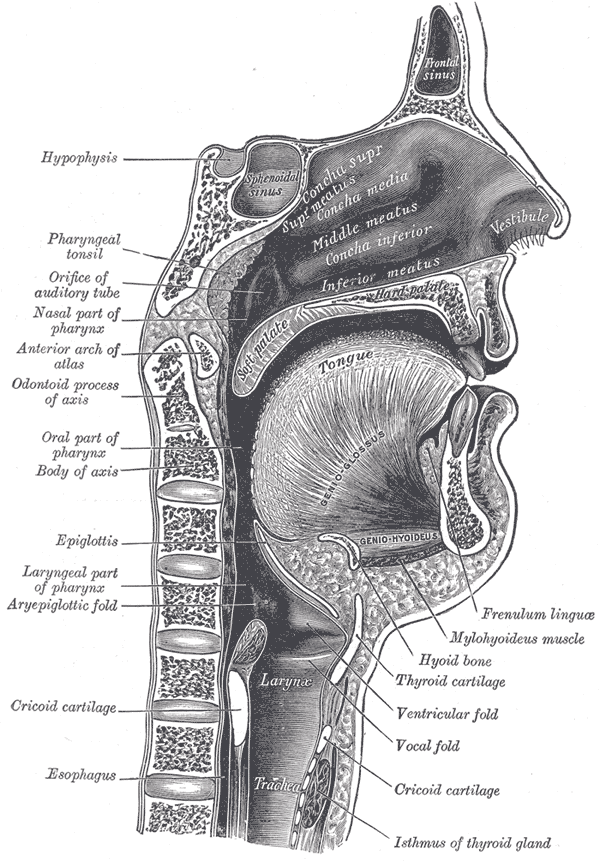
Sagittal section of nose mouth, pharynx, and larynx

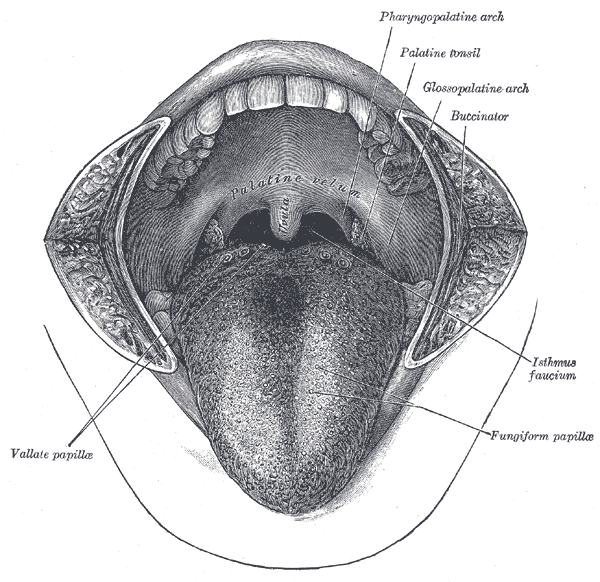
The mouth cavity. The cheeks have been slit transversely and the tongue pulled forward

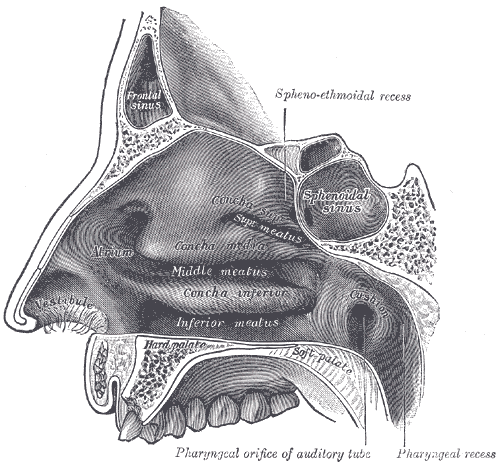
Lateral wall of nasal cavity. (Soft palate visible in lower right)

== See also ==
- Palatine tonsil
- Velotrace
