= Choana =

Openings from the nasal cavity to the throat

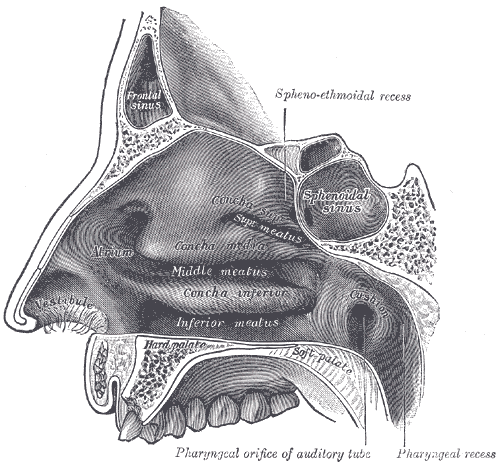
- Lateral wall of nasal cavity

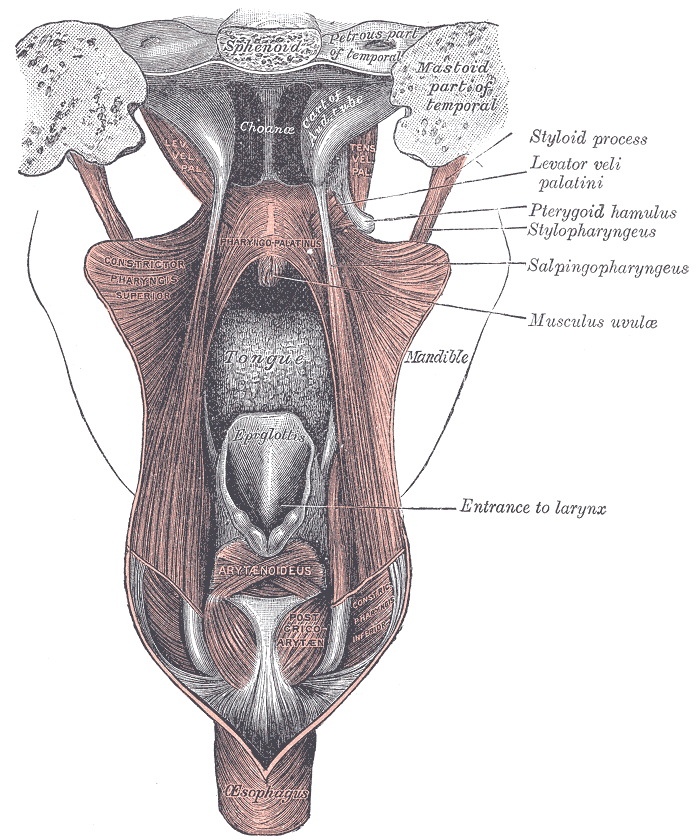
- Dissection of the muscles of the palate from behind (Choanae visible at center top)

Details

Identifiers
- Latin: choana, apertura nasalis posterior
- TA98: A02.1.00.096
- TA2: 501
- FMA: 76585

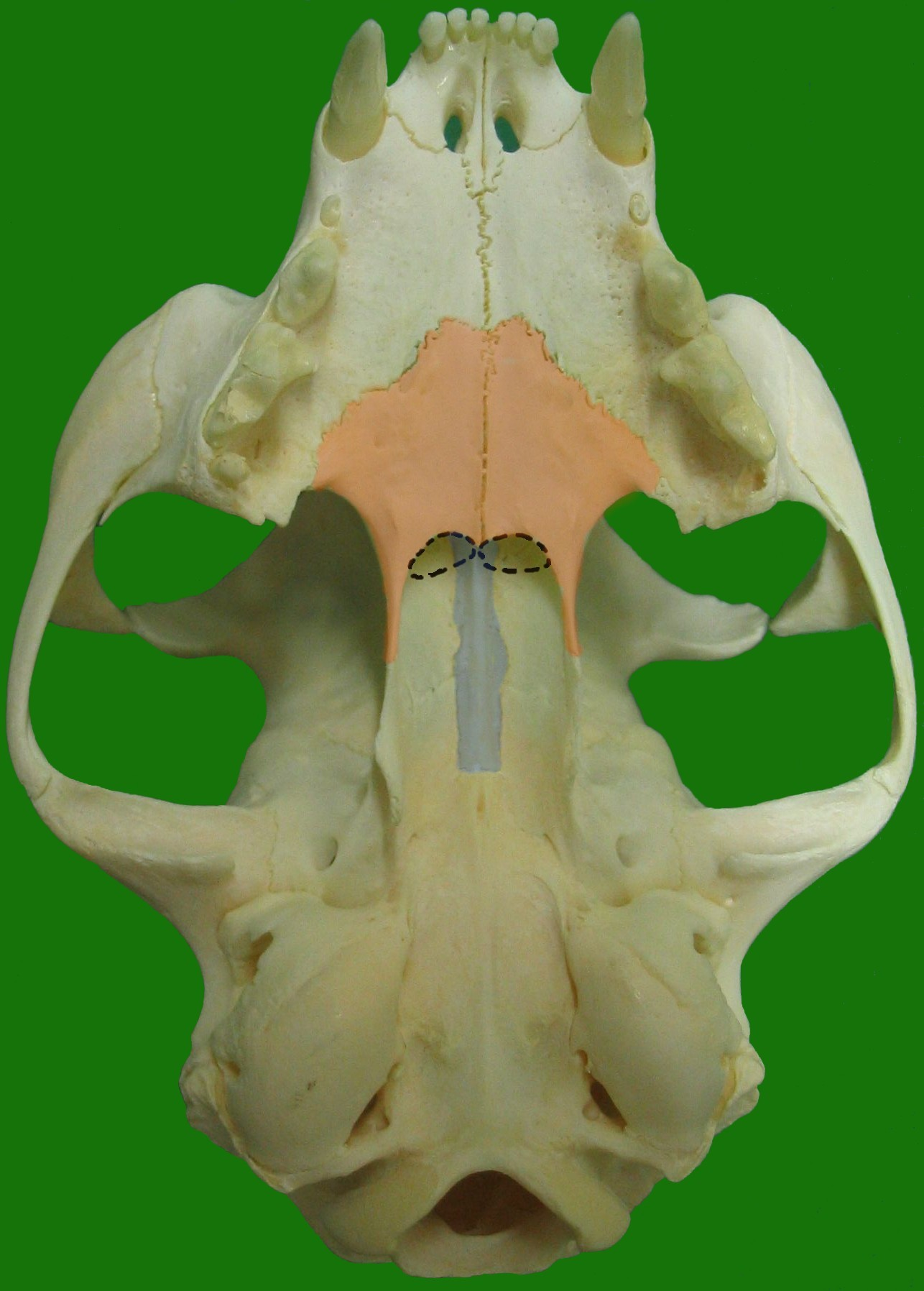
The choanae (internal nostrils) of a cat, indicated by the dashed lines and bounded by the vomer (blue gray) and the palatine bone (orange)

The choanae (sing.: choana), posterior nasal apertures or internal nostrils are two openings found at the back of the nasal passage between the nasal cavity and the pharynx, in humans and other mammals (as well as crocodilians and most skinks). They are considered one of the most important synapomorphies of tetrapodomorphs, that allowed the passage from water to land.

In animals with secondary palates, they allow breathing when the mouth is closed. In tetrapods without secondary palates their function relates primarily to olfaction (sense of smell).

The choanae are separated in two by the vomer.

== Boundaries ==
A choana is the opening between the nasal cavity and the nasopharynx.

It is therefore not a structure but a space bounded as follows:

- In front and below by the horizontal plate of palatine bone
- Above and behind by the sphenoid bone
- The sides by the medial pterygoid plates
- The center by the Vomer

== Etymology ==
The term is a latinization from the Greek word χοάνη (choanē, "funnel").

== Choanae in different animals ==
Early bony fishes (~420 mya) had two pairs of nostrils, one pair for incoming water (known as the anterior or incurrent nostrils), and a second pair for outgoing water (the posterior or excurrent nostrils), with the olfactory apparatus (for sense of smell) in between. In the first tetrapodomorphs (~415 mya) the excurrent nostrils migrated to the edge of the mouth, occupying a position between the maxillary and premaxillary bones, directly below the lateral rostral (a bone that vanished in early tetrapods).

In all but the most basal (primitive) tetrapodomorphs (or "choanates"), the excurrent nostrils have migrated from the edge of the mouth to the interior of the mouth. In tetrapods that lack a secondary palate (basal tetrapods and amphibians), the choanae are located forward in the roof of the mouth, just inside the upper jaw. These internal nasal passages evolved while the vertebrates still lived in water. In animals with complete secondary palates (mammals, crocodilians, most skinks) the space between the primary and secondary palates contain the nasal passages, with the choanae located above the posterior end of the secondary palate.

In animals with partial secondary palates (most birds and reptiles), the median choanal slit separates the two halves of the posterior half of the palate, connecting the nasal cavity with the buccal cavity (mouth) and the pharynx (throat).

=== Fish ===
Most fish do not have choanae, instead they have two pairs of external nostrils: each with two tubes whose frontal openings lie close to the upper jaw, and the posterior openings further behind near the eyes. A 395-million-year-old fossil lobe-finned fish called Kenichthys campbelli has something between a choana and the external nostrils seen on other fish. The posterior opening of the external nostrils has migrated into the mouth.

In lungfish, the inner nostrils are regarded as an example of parallel evolution. The fossil lungfish Diabolepis shows an intermediate stage between posterior and interior nostril and supports the independent origin of internal nostrils in the lungfish.

Hagfishes have a single internal nostril that opens inside the mouth cavity, while chimaeras have open canals that leads water from their external nostrils into their mouths and through their gills.
