= Ostmann's pad of fat =

Ostmann's pad of fat (Ostmann fatty bodies) is a thin triangular layer of fatty tissue found in the Eustachian tube of the ear. It is seen on the lateral side of the cartilaginous part of Eustachian tube. Its function is to keep the tube closed and thereby protect it from reflux of nasopharyngeal secretions. The pad of fat is named after the German otologist Paul Ostmann. In patulous tube syndrome, the Ostmann's pad of fat cannot be visualized using radiological methods.
