= Copula linguae =

Embryonic structure of the tongue

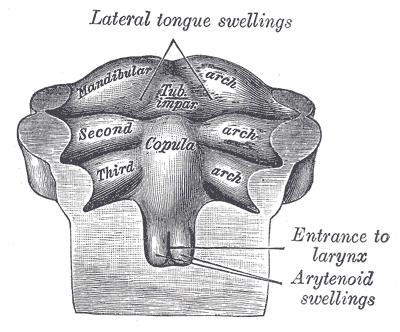
- Floor of pharynx of human embryo of about the end of the fourth week.

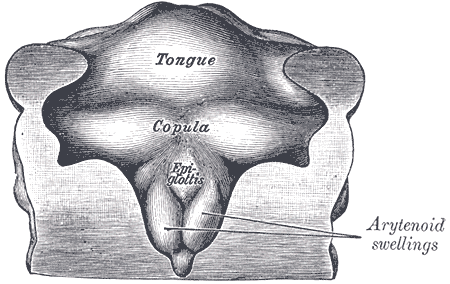
- Floor of pharynx of human embryo about thirty days old.

Details

Identifiers
- Latin: Copula linguae

The copula linguae or copula, is a swelling that forms from the second pharyngeal arch, late in the fourth week of embryogenesis. During the fifth and sixth weeks the copula becomes overgrown and covered by the hypopharyngeal eminence which forms mostly from the third pharyngeal arch and in part from the fourth pharyngeal arch.
