= Anterior nasal spine =

Bony projection in the skull

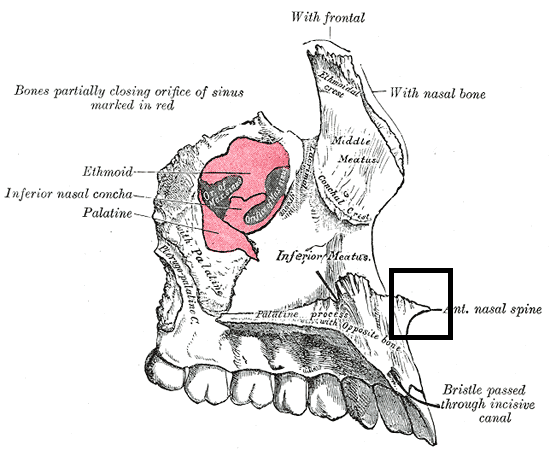
- Left maxilla. Nasal surface (anterior nasal spine labeled at bottom right)

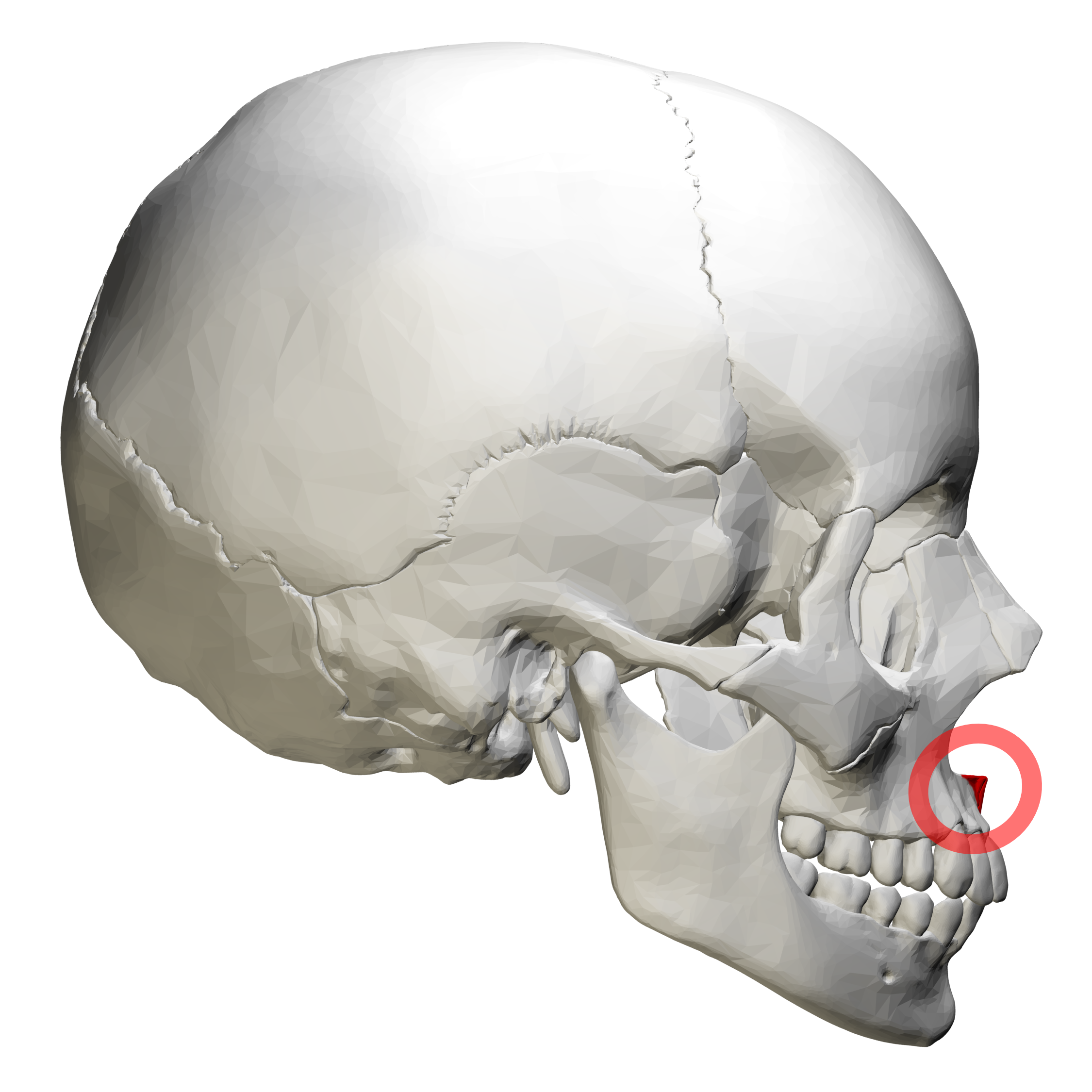
- The skull from the side. Anterior nasal spine is at right (shown in red).

Details

Identifiers
- Latin: spina nasalis anterior maxillae
- TA98: A02.1.12.011
- TA2: 766
- FMA: 75770

The anterior nasal spine, or anterior nasal spine of maxilla, is a bony projection in the skull that serves as a cephalometric landmark. The anterior nasal spine is the projection formed by the fusion of the two maxillary bones at the intermaxillary suture. It is placed at the level of the nostrils, at the uppermost part of the philtrum. It rarely fractures.

== Additional images ==
Animation. Anterior nasal spine shown in red.

Left maxilla. Anterior nasal spine shown in red.

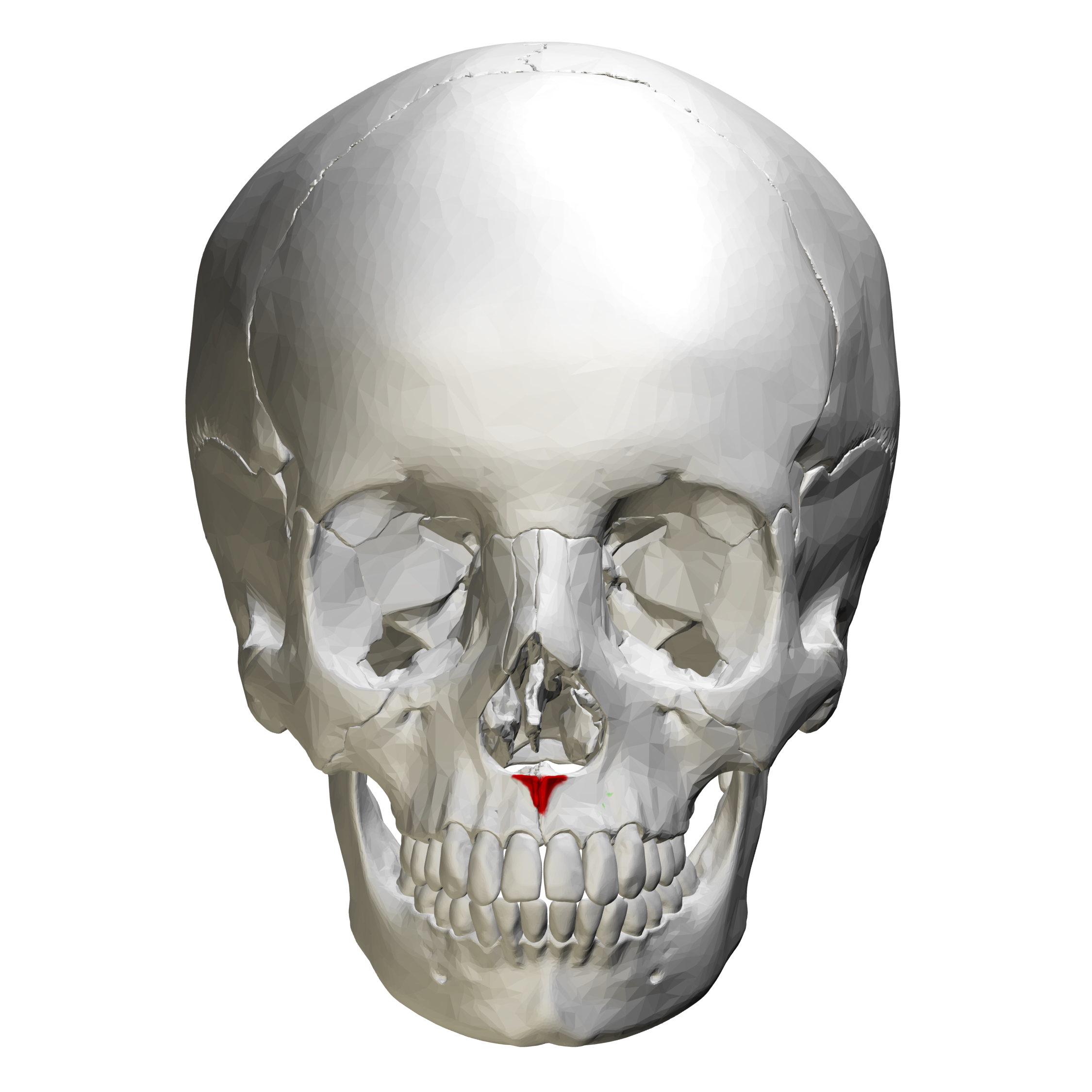
Skull. Anterior view. Anterior nasal spine shown in red.

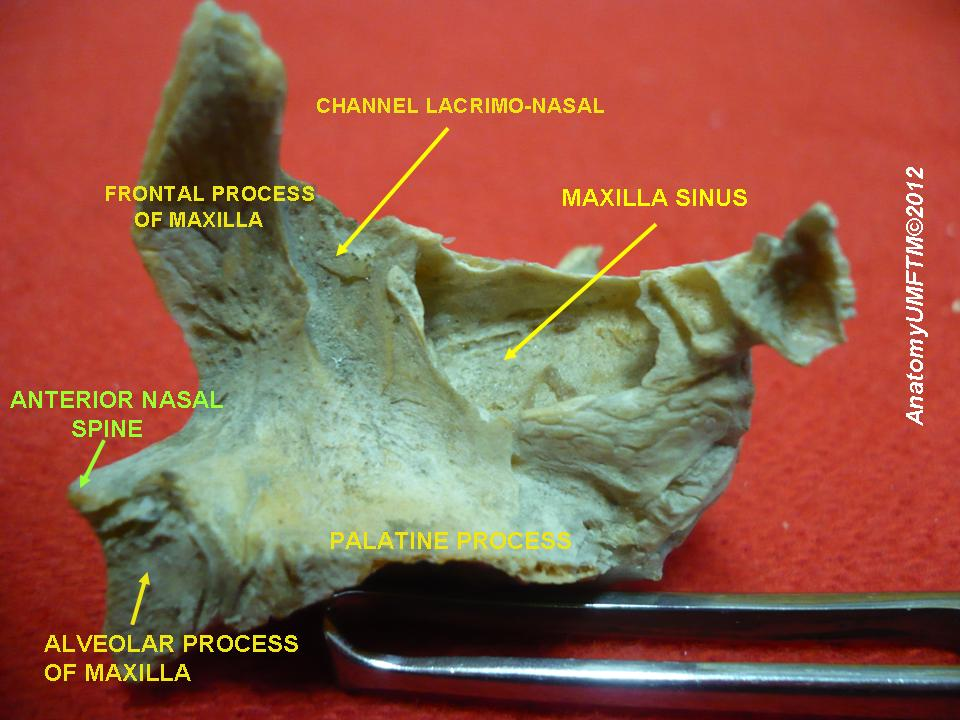
Right maxilla. Anterior nasal spine labeled at center left.

== See also ==
- Posterior nasal spine
