= Musculus uvulae =

Human muscle

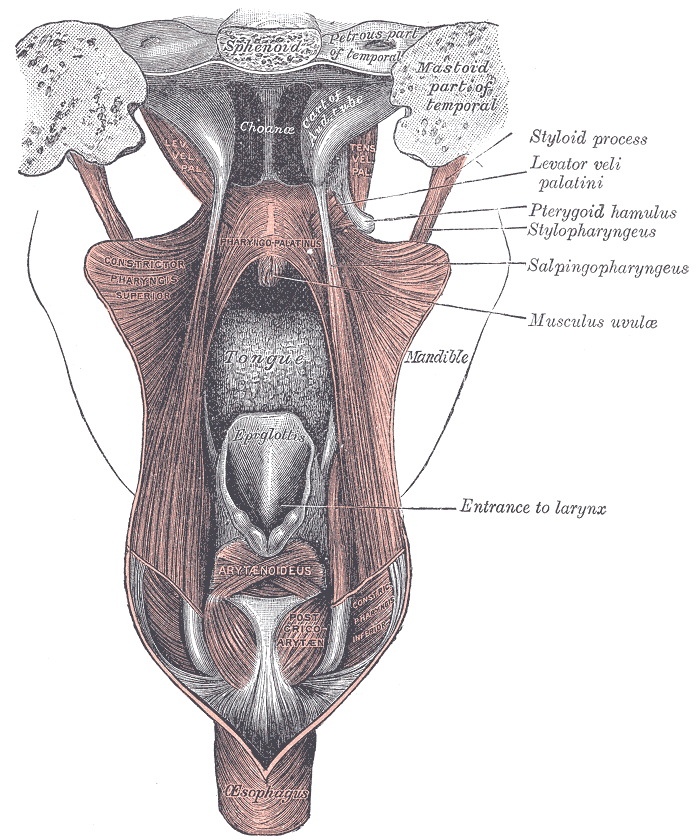

Details
- Origin: Posterior nasal spine and palatine aponeurosis
- Insertion: Uvula
- Nerve: Vagus nerve (via pharyngeal plexus)
- Actions: Retracts the uvula

Identifiers
- Latin: musculus uvulae, musculus azygos uvulae, uvularis
- TA98: A05.2.01.104
- TA2: 2130
- FMA: 46733

The musculus uvulae (also muscle of uvula, uvular muscle, or palatouvularis muscle) is a bilaterally muscle of the soft palate (one of five such muscles) that acts to shorten the uvula when both muscles contract. It forms most of the mass of the uvula. It is innervated by the pharyngeal plexus of vagus nerve (cranial nerve X).

== Anatomy ==
The muscle is situated in between the two laminae of the palatine aponeurosis. From its origin, it passes posterior-ward superior to the swing that is formed by the levator veli palatini muscle. The musculus uvulae and levator veli palatini muscle form a right angle so that their contraction elevates the levator eminence to aid in separating the oral cavity and the oropharynx.

=== Origin ===
The muscle arises from the posterior nasal spine of the palatine bone, and the (superior aspect of the) palatine aponeurosis.

=== Insertion ===
The muscle inserts into the mucous membrane of the uvula.

=== Vasculature ===
The muscle receives arterial blood from the ascending palatine artery, and the descending palatine artery.

=== Actions/movements ===
Bilateral contraction of the two muscles shortens the uvula. It also elevates and retracts the uvula.

Unilateral contraction draws the uvula ipsilaterally.

== Function ==
By retracting the uvula and thickening the middle portion of the soft palate, the muscle assist the levator veli palatini in separating the oral cavity and the oropharynx.
