= Palatoglossus muscle =

Muscle of the soft palate

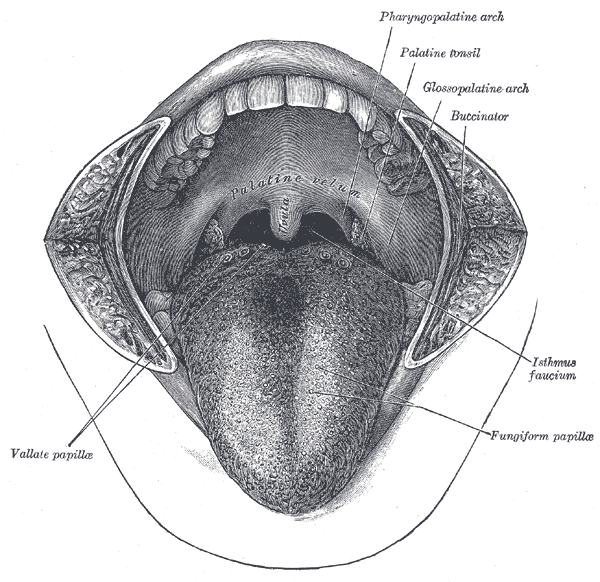
- The mouth cavity seen from anterior view. The palatoglossus muscle is beneath the glossopalatine arch (labeled at upper right)

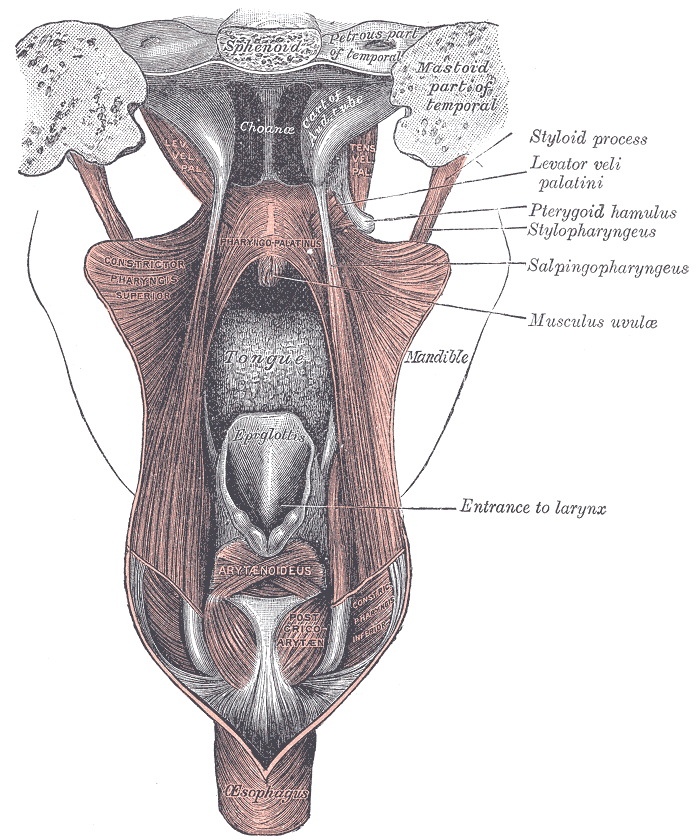
- Dissection of the muscles of the palate from behind. (palatoglossus muscle not labeled)

Details
- Origin: Palatine aponeurosis
- Insertion: Tongue
- Nerve: Vagus nerve (via pharyngeal branch to pharyngeal plexus)
- Actions: Raising the back part of the tongue

Identifiers
- Latin: musculus palatoglossus
- TA98: A05.1.04.110
- TA2: 2131
- FMA: 46697

The palatoglossal muscle is a muscle of the soft palate and an extrinsic muscle of the tongue. Its surface is covered by oral mucosa and forms the visible palatoglossal arch.

== Structure ==
=== Origin ===
The palatoglossus arises (the oral aspect of) the palatine aponeurosis of the soft palate, where it is continuous with its contralateral partner (i.e. the same muscle of the opposite side).

=== Insertion ===
From its origin, it passes anteroinferiorly and laterally. It passes anterior to the palatine tonsil. It inserts onto the side of the tongue; some of its fibers extend over the dorsum of the tongue, and some pass into the substance of the tongue to intermingle with the transverse muscle of tongue.

=== Innervation ===
The palatoglossus muscle receives motor innervation from the pharyngeal plexus of vagus nerve.

It is the only muscle of the tongue not innervated by the hypoglossal nerve (CN XII).

==== Controversy ====
Some sources state that the palatoglossus is innervated by fibers from the cranial part of the accessory nerve (CN XI) that travel via the pharyngeal plexus.

Other sources state that the palatoglossus is not innervated by XI hitchhiking on X, but rather it is innervated by IX via the pharyngeal plexus formed from IX and X.

=== Actions/movements ===
The palatoglossus elevates the root of the tongue (i.e. the posterior attached portion of the tongue). It approximates the ipsilateral (same side) palatoglossal arch to the contralateral (opposite side) one, thus separating the oral cavity and the oropharynx.

== Function ==
It closes the oropharyngeal isthmus, and aids initiation of swallowing. This muscle also prevents the spill of saliva from vestibule into the oropharynx by maintaining the palatoglossal arch.
