= Pharyngeal branch of vagus nerve =

Principal motor nerve of the pharynx

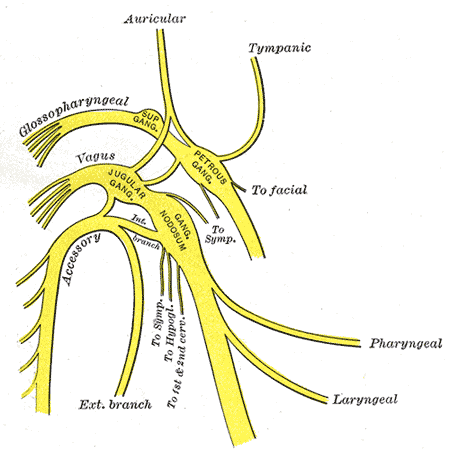
- Plan of upper portions of glossopharyngeal, vagus, and accessory nerves. (Pharyngeal visible at center right.)

Details
- From: Vagus nerve
- To: Pharyngeal plexus
- Innervates: Pharynx

Identifiers
- Latin: ramus pharyngeus nervus vagus
- TA98: A14.2.01.158
- TA2: 6337
- FMA: 6234

The pharyngeal branch of the vagus nerve is the principal motor nerve of the pharynx. It represents the motor component of the pharyngeal plexus, and ultimately provides motor innervation to most of the muscles of the soft palate (all but the tensor veli palatini muscle), and of the pharynx (all but the stylopharyngeus muscle).

The neuron cell bodies of the axons of the pharyngeal branch reside in the nucleus ambiguus. The pharyngeal branch arises from the superior portion of the inferior ganglion of vagus nerve. It passes in between the external carotid artery and internal carotid artery; upon reaching the superior border of the middle pharyngeal constrictor muscle the nerve ramifies into numerous filaments that contribute to the formation of the pharyngeal plexus.

== Anatomy ==
=== Origin ===
Putative contribution from cranial root of accessory nerve (CN XI)

It is unclear whether the cranial root of accessory nerve (CN XI) makes a significant contribution of nerve fibres to the CN X that would then proceed to constitute the pharyngeal branch.

== See also ==
- Pharyngeal nerve
