= Tensor veli palatini muscle =

Muscle of the soft palate

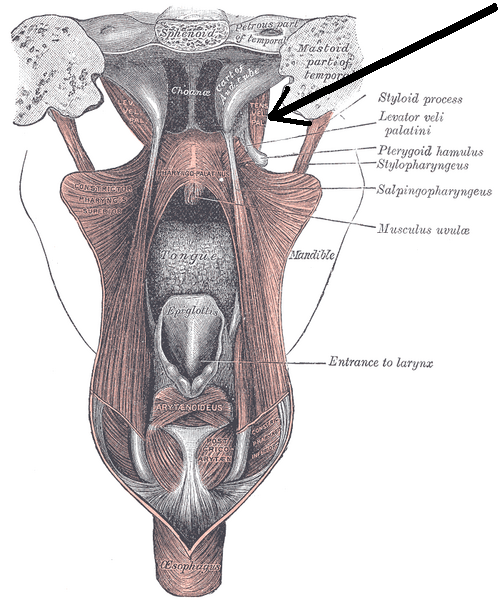
- Dissection of the muscles of the palate from behind (tensor veli palatini visible at upper right)

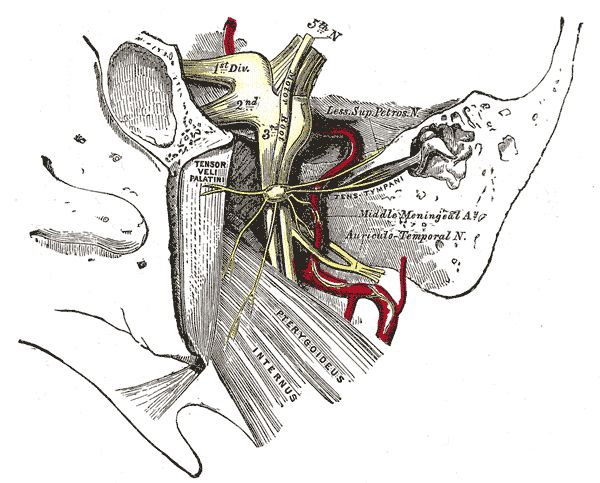
- The otic ganglion and its branches (tensor veli palatini visible at center left)

Details
- Origin: Medial pterygoid plate of the sphenoid bone (scaphoid fossa)
- Insertion: Palatine aponeurosis
- Nerve: Mandibular nerve (V_{3})
- Actions: Tension of the soft palate

Identifiers
- Latin: musculus tensor veli palatini
- TA98: A05.2.01.103
- TA2: 2129
- FMA: 46730

The tensor veli palatini muscle (tensor palati or tensor muscle of the velum palatinum) is a thin, triangular muscle of the head that tenses the soft palate and opens the Eustachian tube to equalise pressure in the middle ear.

== Structure ==
The tensor veli palatini muscle is thin and triangular in shape.

=== Origin ===
It arises from the scaphoid fossa of the pterygoid process of the sphenoid anteriorly, the (medial aspect of the) spine of sphenoid bone posteriorly, and - between the aforementioned anterior and posterior attachments - from the anterolateral aspect of the membranous wall of the pharyngotympanic tube.

At the muscle's origin, some of its muscle fibres may be continuous with those of the tensor tympani muscle.

=== Insertion ===
Inferiorly, the muscle converges to form a tendon of attachment. This tendon winds medially around the pterygoid hamulus (with a small bursa interposed between the two) to insert into the palatine aponeurosis and into the bony surface posterior to the palatine crest of the horizontal plate of palatine bone.

==== Dilator tubae component ====
Some of the muscle's fibres insert onto the lateral lamina of the cartilaginous part of pharyngotympanic tube and adjacent connective tissue, and the Ostmann's fat pad.

The portion of the muscle with these attachments is sometimes called the dilator tubae.

=== Innervation ===
The tensor veli palatini muscle receives motor innervation from the mandibular nerve (CN V_{3}) (a branch of the trigeminal nerve (CN V)) via the nerve to medial pterygoid.

It is the only muscle of the palate not innervated by the pharyngeal plexus, which is formed by the vagal and glossopharyngeal nerves.

=== Relations ===
It is situated anterolaterally to the levator veli palatini muscle.

From its origin to its insertion, the muscle passes vertically between the medial pterygoid plate and the medial pterygoid muscle.

=== Actions/movements ===
Bilateral contraction of the two tensor veli palatini muscles makes the soft palate (especially its anterior portion) taut, as well as flattening the arch of the soft palate and thereby depressing it.

Unilateral contraction draws the soft palate ipsilaterally.

== Function ==
The tensor veli palatini tenses the soft palate and by doing so, assists the levator veli palatini in elevating the palate to occlude and prevent entry of food into the nasopharynx during swallowing. The tensed palate consequently provides a stable platform for elevation of the pharynx during swallowing by the pharyngeal muscles.

Since it is also attached to the lateral cartilaginous lamina of the pharyngotympanic tube (auditory tube or Eustachian tube), it assists in its opening during swallowing or yawning to allow air pressure to equalize between the tympanic cavity and the outside air. Equalization of air pressure in the tympanic cavity is essential for preventing damage to the tympanic membrane and a resulting loss of hearing acuity.

== Additional images ==
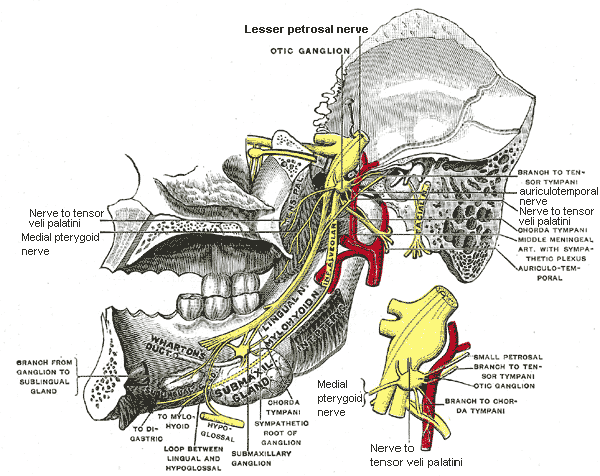
Mandibular division of trigeminal nerve, seen from the middle line

== See also ==
- Levator veli palatini
