= Prevertebral =

Prevertebral may refer to:

- Prevertebral fascia
- Prevertebral ganglia
- Prevertebral muscles
- Prevertebral plexus
- Prevertebral space
