= Peripharyngeal space =

Area of the throat

Details

Identifiers
- Latin: spatium peripharyngeum
- TA98: A05.3.01.117
- TA2: 2883
- FMA: 84964

The peripharyngeal space is a space in the neck.

It can be split into the retropharyngeal space and the parapharyngeal space.
