= Mouth infection =

Group of infections occurring around the oral cavity

Mouth infections, also known as oral infections, are a group of infections that occur around the oral cavity. They include dental infection, dental abscess, and Ludwig's angina. Mouth infections typically originate from dental caries at the root of molars and premolars that spread to adjacent structures. In otherwise healthy patients, removing the offending tooth to allow drainage will usually resolve the infection. In cases that spread to adjacent structures or in immunocompromised patients (cancer, diabetes, transplant immunosuppression), surgical drainage and systemic antibiotics may be required in addition to tooth extraction. Since bacteria that normally reside in the oral cavity cause mouth infections, proper dental hygiene can prevent most cases of infection. As such, mouth infections are more common in populations with poor access to dental care (homeless, uninsured, etc.) or populations with health-related behaviors that damage one's teeth and oral mucosa (tobacco, methamphetamine, etc.). This is a common problem, representing nearly 36% of all encounters within the emergency department related to dental conditions.

Patients with mouth infections usually complain of pain at the affected tooth with or without fevers. The inability to fully open one's mouth, also known as trismus, suggests that the infection has spread to spaces between the jaw and muscles of mastication (masseter, medial pterygoid, and temporalis). If an abscess has formed, swelling, redness, and tenderness will be present. Depending on the location of the abscess, it will be visible intraorally, extraorally, or both. Severe infections with significant swelling may cause airway obstruction by shifting/enlarging soft tissue structures (floor of mouth, tongue, etc.) or by causing dysphagia that prevents adequate clearance of saliva. This is a medical emergency and may require endonasal intubation or tracheotomy to protect one's airway. The development of stridor, shortness of breath, and pooling oral secretions may indicate impending airway compromise due to a worsening mouth infection. Other rare but dangerous complications include osteomyelitis, cavernous sinus thrombosis, and deep neck space infection.

== Signs and symptoms ==
Dental pain and swelling are the two hallmark symptoms of a mouth infection. Fever is sometimes present, but not as frequently as tooth pain or persistent swelling. The swelling will occur at the tooth root or at the spaces occupied by the infection. Other symptoms that usually accompany an infection like increased heart rate, low energy, chills, and sweating may also be present. If infection spreads to the space between the muscles of mastication, then trismus, the inability to completely open one's mouth, will also be present.

Severe mouth infections become dangerous when breathing or swallowing are impaired. Since the primary and secondary spaces extend towards the back of the throat, significant swelling can lead to airway obstruction. Signs and symptoms of airway obstruction are difficulty breathing, stridor, low oxygen saturation measured by a pulse oximeter, blue discoloration of the skin or lips, and stridor. Similarly, infections that spread to adjacent structures may also impair swallowing or cause significant pain with swallowing. Individuals with long-standing infections may lose significant weight because pain blunts their desire and impairs their ability to eat food. When infections affect swallowing, one may not be able to swallow saliva and other oral secretions faster than they are produced, causing drooling. Pooling secretions at the back of the throat increases the likelihood of the saliva traveling down the windpipe and into the lungs instead of through the esophagus and into the stomach. This process of breathing in material that should be swallowed is known as aspiration, and can lead to more infections like pneumonia.

=== Complications ===
The complications that arise from mouth infections depend on how long the infection has persisted and where the infection has spread. The three main, albeit rare, complications of mouth infections are osteomyelitis, cavernous sinus thrombosis, and deep neck space infections.

==== Osteomyelitis ====
Mouth infections that persist for months have the potential to cause a chronic infection of the surrounding bone, also known as osteomyelitis.

==== Cavernous sinus thrombosis ====
Although rare, mouth infections may also spread through the nasal and facial veins that drain into a reservoir of deoxygenated blood called the cavernous sinus. Once the infection has spread to the cavernous sinus, it can compress important nerves (cranial nerves III, IV, V1, V2, and VI) within this space and obstruct venous drainage from the upper face. The main symptoms are swelling and pain of both eyes, fever, changes in vision, and headaches. On exam, redness and decreased range of motion of the eyes are present in about 90% of cases. Treatment includes antibiotics and antithrombotics to treat the infection and blood clot. This is a serious complication that leads to death or serious morbidity if not diagnosed within the first week of symptoms.

==== Deep neck space infection ====
Deep neck space infections are mouth infections that have spread to the spaces between the connective tissue that separates the compartments of the neck, also known as the deep cervical fascia. When an infection involves the deep neck spaces, patients may report a wide variety of symptoms, including fever, pain with swallowing, inability to swallow, confusion, reduced mobility of the neck, chest pain, shortness of breath, and many other alarming symptoms. If the infection remains untreated or under treated, then even more serious complications can occur like descending necrotizing mediastinitis (infection of the soft tissues that encase the heart) and cervical necrotizing fasciitis (infection of the soft tissues along the throat and cervical spine). The mortality rate of mouth infections that affect the deep neck space and lead to necrotizing mediastinitis or necrotizing fasciitis is high at around a 40-60% mortality rate.

== Causes ==
Mouth infections are most commonly caused by an overgrowth of bacteria that normally populate the oral cavity. In a healthy adult, billions of bacteria, viruses, and fungi reside within the oral cavity and represent more than 500 different species. They are collectively known as the oral microbiome. When healthy, the oral microbiome is in dynamic equilibrium such that no one bacteria or group of organisms dominates. However, certain situations, like a decaying tooth root or a penetrating puncture wound from a fish bone, can generate an environment that disrupts the normal oral microbiome and promote the growth of pathogenic bacteria. Although sore throats (pharyngitis) are caused by viruses and oral yeast infections (candidiasis) are caused by fungi, most mouth infections that lead to swelling and abscesses are caused by bacteria.

The bacteria of the oral microbiome consist of a wide variety of gram positive cocci and rods, gram negative cocci and rods, obligate anaerobes, and facultative anaerobes. The most common bacteria that causes mouth infections are Streptococcus species. Poor dental hygiene promotes the accumulation of these bacteria at the tooth root, eventually causing a cavity or dental caries. The decaying tooth root provides bacteria with an enclosed environment with low oxygen content. Consequently, the obligate and facultative anaerobes present within the oral cavity flourish and outcompete the other bacteria at the site of tooth decay, causing the dental caries to escalate into a mouth infection. The corrosive enzymes released by the anaerobes erode the surrounding bone and enable the infection to invade surrounding structures. Given the natural history of a mouth infection, the vast majority of clinically treated oral infections are polymicrobial, or caused by multiple different species of bacteria at the same time. Until the source of the infection is controlled with some form of drainage and antibiotics, a mouth infection will likely not resolve on its own.

== Anatomy of mouth ==
Anatomy of mouth

The anatomy of the oral cavity affects the progression of infection and dictates the severity of disease. In other words, where the infection starts will determine the pattern of its spread and its catastrophic potential based on the surrounding anatomy.

=== Oral cavity ===
The oral cavity serves as the starting point of the digestive track and facilitates breathing as a channel for airflow to the lungs. The borders of the oral cavity include the lips in the front, cheeks on the side, mylohyoid muscle/associated soft tissue below, soft and hard palate above, and the oropharynx at the back. The most important structures within the mouth include teeth for chewing and the tongue for speech and assistance with swallowing. The oral cavity is lined with specialized mucosa containing salivary glands that moisten food, breakdown sugars, and humidify air prior to entering the lungs. The roots of the upper teeth are anchored into a bone called the maxilla, more commonly known as the hard palate, at ridges called the alveolar process. The roots of the lower teeth are anchored into a bone called the mandible, more commonly known as the jaw, at their respective alveolar processes. The surface of the oral cavity between the teeth and the inner side of the lips are called the oral vestibule.

Surrounding the oral cavity, there are many different muscles that facilitate chewing, opening the mouth, and swallowing. Each muscle, group of muscles, or separate anatomical compartment is encased in a thin fibrous layer of connective tissue called fascia. Normally, the fascia of adjacent structures are in direct contact with each other. However, air or pus can occupy the space between adjacent fascia, known as fascial planes, and collect over time. As the air pocket or pus enlarges within the fascial planes, the structures surrounding the abnormality can become compressed or shifted out of its normal place. These phenomena of compression and deviation due to a growing infection/air pocket drive the progression of disease into potentially life-threatening situations.

=== Spread of oral infection ===
Mouth infections spread from the root of the infected tooth through the jaw bones and into potential spaces between the fascial planes of surrounding soft tissue, eventually forming an abscess. These potential spaces are usually empty, but can expand and form a pocket of pus when an infection drains into them. The potential spaces are categorized into primary and secondary spaces.

==== Primary space ====
A primary space is a potential space between adjacent soft tissue structures that communicate directly with the infected tooth through the eroded bone. In the upper jaw (maxilla), the primary spaces are the buccal and vestibular spaces. The most clinically significant structures that dictate the pattern of infectious spread are the buccinator muscle and the maxillary sinus. Infection that originates above the buccinator's attachment point with the maxilla will spread laterally into the buccal space. Infection that begins below the buccinator's attachment point with the maxilla will spread inferiorly into the vestibular space. Rarely, the infection will spread upwards into the maxillary sinus and cause a sinusitis.

In the lower jaw (mandible), the primary spaces are the sublingual, submandibular, and submental spaces. The location of the mylohyoid dictates the spread of infection. It attaches to the mandible along a line that separates the sublingual and submandibular space. If an infection begins above the mylohyoid's point of attachment, then the infection will spread to the sublingual space. If the infection originates below the mylohyoid's point of attachment, then the infection will spread to the submandibular space. The submental space is located behind the mentalis muscles, and infections spread to this space when the oral infection begins at the roots of the mandibular incisors because they are so long.

==== Secondary space ====
Primary spaces are the result of direct spread from the infected tooth, while secondary spaces are the result of spread from primary spaces. In the oral cavity, mouth infections from primary spaces can spread to fascial planes between the muscles of mastication (masseter, medial pterygoid, and temporalis) or within the deep neck spaces. The space between the muscles of mastication is collectively known as the masticator space and they are all connected with each other at the back of the throat. Therefore, when an infection spreads to the masticator space, significant swelling, tenderness, and trismus are usually present. Deep neck spaces, another set of secondary spaces, are located between fascial planes that separate the deeper structures of the neck into discrete compartments. They are important because they begin at the back of the throat and depending on the space, can track downwards to the chest cavity or encase the windpipe. Infections that involve the deep neck spaces are rare, but must be treated immediately with surgery to washout the infection because they can compromise the airway and lead to fatal complications like mediastinitis.

== Diagnosis ==
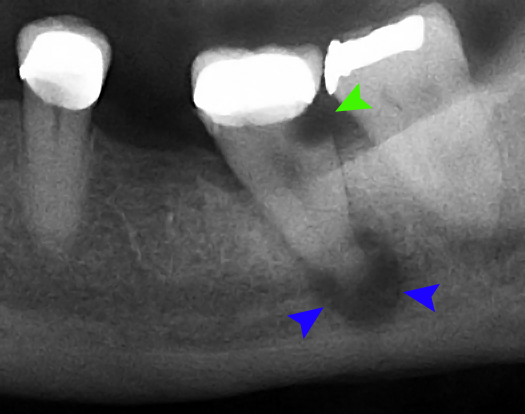
Green arrows indicate tooth decay. Blue arrows indicate abscess at root of tooth. The infection at the root of the tooth can travel through bone and infect surrounding soft tissue.

Mouth infections are usually diagnosed on history and physical exam in the dental office or at a clinic visit with an otolaryngologist. Swelling within the oral cavity or cheeks, along with a history of progressively worsening tooth pain and fevers, is usually enough evidence to support the diagnosis of a mouth infection. Depending on the severity of the infection, further tests may include x-rays and CT scans of the mouth to better characterize the location and extent of the infection. If the infection is drained with a needle or scalpel, then a swab of the infection is collected to identify the microbes present in the abscess and to determine their respective susceptibilities to antibiotics. Other lab tests may include a complete blood count with differential, serum electrolyte concentrations, and other routine assays for an infectious workup.

== Treatment ==
Although mouth infections can present in many different ways, they are managed according to the same guiding principles - protect the airway, drain the abscess, and treat with antibiotics if necessary. Securing a patient's airway is the most important part of initial treatment because loss of airway is emergently life-threatening. Inflammation and large abscesses, particularly those within the floor of the mouth, may block airflow into the lungs. To pre-emptively protect a patient's airway, placing flexible plastic tubing through the nasal cavity and into the trachea, called endonasal intubation, is typically the first option. It can be performed with or without direct visualization with laryngoscopy, a small camera with a live video feed to ensure the tubing is placed in the proper location. If attempts to intubate through the nasal cavity are unsuccessful or if the airway must be re-established quickly, then an incision can be made through the front of the neck to gain access into the trachea, also known as a tracheotomy.

After stabilizing the patient's airway, extracting the infected tooth will typically promote adequate drainage and the infection will resolve shortly thereafter. If the infection involves multiple primary spaces or any of the secondary spaces previously mentioned, then incision and drainage with culture-guided antibiotics may be indicated. Since most mouth infections are polymicrobial, penicillin is an appropriate initial choice of antibiotic because of its activity against Streptococcus and gram negative anaerobes. If the patient has a penicillin allergy, then clindamycin with or without metronidazole are also effective empiric antibiotic regimens. Additionally, empiric antibiotics should be initiated in patients with a compromised immune system, like those on immunosuppressive medications, with diabetes, or with cancer. In situations where the infection worsens or fails to improve after multiple days, washing out the wound in the operating room should control the source of infection and promote healing.
