= Retropharyngeal =

Retropharyngeal may refer to:

- Retropharyngeal abscess
- Retropharyngeal space
