= Hypersalivation =

Excessive production of saliva

- Other names: Ptyalism, sialorrhea, water brash
- Specialty: Oral and maxillofacial surgery

Hypersalivation or hypersialosis is the excessive production of saliva. It has also been defined as increased amount of saliva in the mouth, which may also be caused by decreased clearance of saliva.

Hypersalivation can contribute to drooling if there is an inability to keep the mouth closed or difficulty in swallowing (dysphagia) the excess saliva, which can lead to excessive spitting.

Hypersalivation also often precedes emesis (vomiting), where it accompanies nausea (a feeling of needing to vomit).

== Causes ==
=== Excessive production ===
Conditions that can cause saliva overproduction include:

- Rabies
- Pellagra (niacin or vitamin B_{3} deficiency)
- Gastroesophageal reflux disease, in such cases specifically called a water brash (a loosely defined lay term), and is characterized by a sour fluid or almost tasteless saliva in the mouth
- Gastroparesis (main symptoms are nausea, vomiting, and reflux)
- Pregnancy
- Fluoride therapy
- Excessive starch intake
- Anxiety (common sign of separation anxiety in dogs)
- Pancreatitis
- Liver disease
- Serotonin syndrome
- Mouth ulcers
- Oral infections
- Sjögren syndrome (an early symptom in some patients)

Medications that can cause overproduction of saliva include:

- aripiprazole
- clozapine
- pilocarpine
- ketamine
- potassium chlorate
- risperidone
- pyridostigmine

Substances that can cause hypersalivation include:

- mercury
- copper
- organophosphates (insecticide)
- arsenic
- nicotine
- thallium

=== Decreased clearance ===
Causes of decreased clearance of saliva include:

- Infections such as tonsillitis, retropharyngeal and peritonsillar abscesses, epiglottitis and mumps.
- Problems with the jaw, e.g., fracture or dislocation
- Radiation therapy
- Neurologic disorders such as Amyotrophic lateral sclerosis, myasthenia gravis, Parkinson's disease, multiple system atrophy, rabies, bulbar paralysis, bilateral facial nerve palsy, frontotemporal dementia, and hypoglossal nerve palsy

== Treatment ==
Hypersalivation is optimally treated by treating or avoiding the underlying cause. Mouthwash and tooth brushing may have drying effects.

In the palliative care setting, anticholinergics and similar drugs normally reduce the production of saliva, causing a dry mouth; thus, they could be considered for symptom management. Such drugs include scopolamine, atropine, propantheline, hyoscine, amitriptyline, and glycopyrrolate.

As of 2008, it is unclear if medication for people who have too much saliva due to clozapine treatment is useful.
