= Danger space =

Potential space in the neck

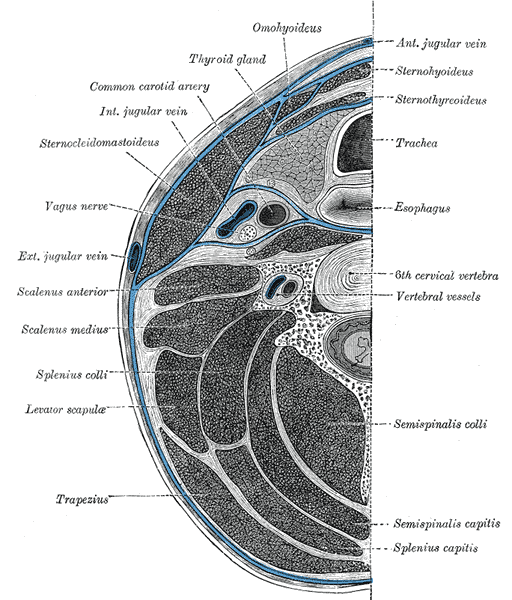
- Section of the neck at about the level of the sixth cervical vertebra. Showing the arrangement of the fascia coli.

The danger space or alar space, is a region of the neck. The common name originates from the risk that an infection in this space can spread directly to the thorax, and, due to being a space continuous on the left and right, can furthermore allow infection to spread easily to either side.

== Structure ==
It is bounded at the top by the skull base, at the front by the alar fascia and behind by the prevertebral fascia. It comes to an end at the level of the diaphragm.

The retropharyngeal space is found anterior to the danger space, between the alar fascia and buccopharyngeal fascia. There exists a midline raphe in this space so some infections of this space appear unilateral. The retropharyngeal space drains into the superior mediastinum, whereas the danger space drains into the posterior mediastinum.

== Clinical significance ==
On CT or MRI it is only visible when distended by fluid or pus, below the level of T1-T6, as the retropharyngeal space ends at this level, allowing distinction between the two entities. Superior spread of infection can affect the contents of the carotid sheath, including the internal jugular vein and cranial nerves IX, X, XI, and XII, while inferior spread of infection through the danger space can cause mediastinitis.

== History ==
It was first characterized in 1938.

== See also ==
- Retrovisceral space
