= Buccopharyngeal fascia =

Connective tissue in the head

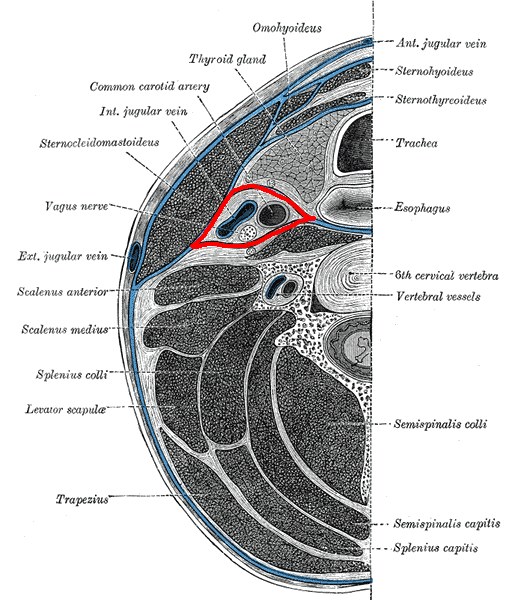
- Carotid sheath outlined in red

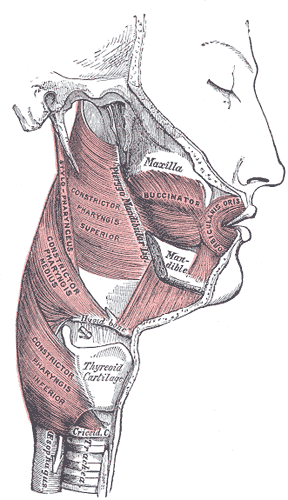
- Muscles of the pharynx and cheek

Details

Identifiers
- Latin: fascia buccopharyngea
- TA98: A04.1.04.010; A05.3.01.116
- TA2: 2211
- FMA: 55078

The buccopharyngeal fascia is a fascia of the pharynx. It represents the posterior portion of the pretracheal fascia (visceral fascia). It covers the superior pharyngeal constrictor muscles, and buccinator muscle.

== Structure ==
The buccopharyngeal fascia is a thin lamina given off from the pretracheal fascia. It is the portion of the pretracheal fascia situated posterior and lateral to the pharynx. It encloses the entire superior part of the alimentary canal.

The buccopharyngeal fascia envelops the superior pharyngeal constrictor muscles. It extends anteriorly from the constrictor pharyngis superior over the pterygomandibular raphe to cover the buccinator muscle (though another source describes it as continuous with the fascia covering the buccinator muscle).

=== Attachments ===
It is attached to the prevertebral fascia by loose connective tissue, with the retropharyngeal space found between them. It may also be attached to the alar fascia posteriorly at C3 and C6 levels.

=== Relations ===
The thyroid gland wraps around the trachea and oesophagus anterior to the buccopharyngeal fascia, so that the lateral parts of the thyroid gland border it.

The buccopharyngeal fascia runs parallel to the medial aspect of the carotid sheath.

== Additional images ==
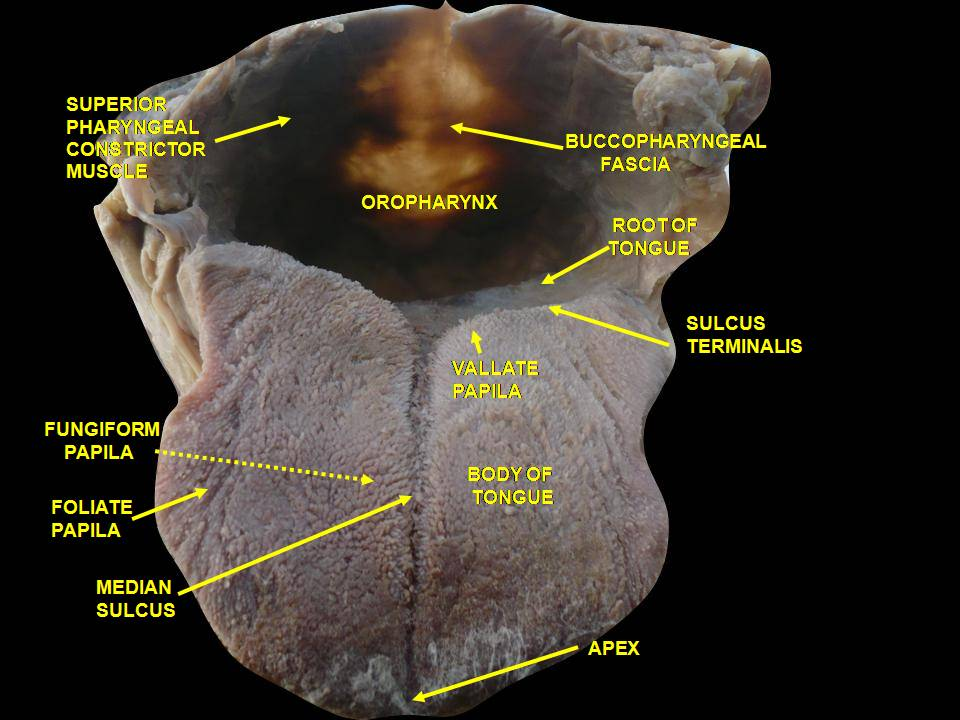
Floor of mouth. Deep dissection.Anterior view.

== See also ==
- Pharyngobasilar fascia
