= Retrovisceral space =

Space of the head and neck

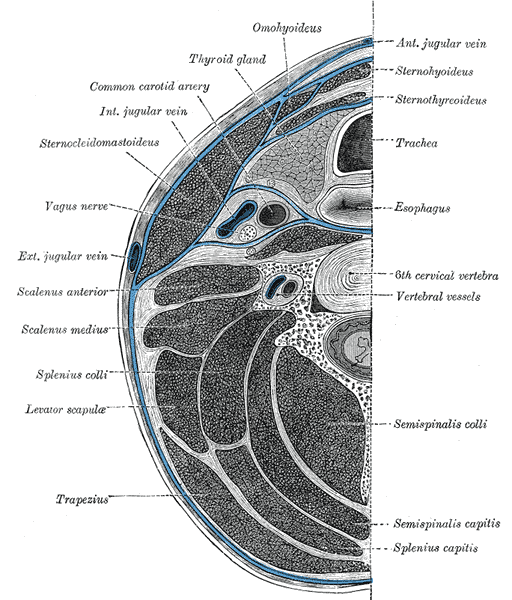
- Section of the neck at about the level of the sixth cervical vertebra. Showing the arrangement of the fascia coli.

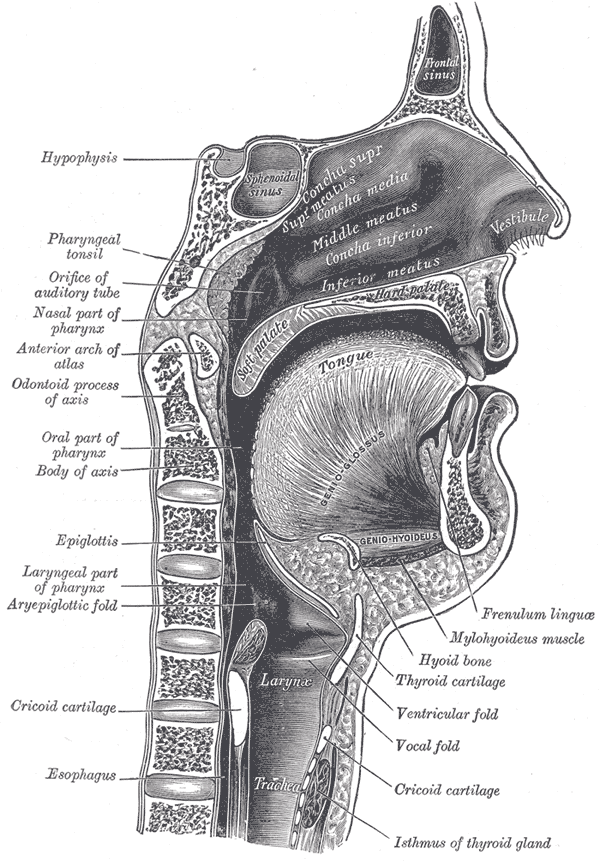
- Sagittal section of nose mouth, pharynx, and larynx.

The retrovisceral space is divided into the retropharyngeal space and the danger space by the alar fascia. It is of particular clinical importance because it is a main route by which oropharyngeal infections can spread into the mediastinum.

Some sources say the retrovisceral space is the same as the retropharyngeal space.

Other sources say that the retrovisceral space is "continuous superiorly" with the retropharyngeal space.
