= Axillary sheath =

Fibrous sheath

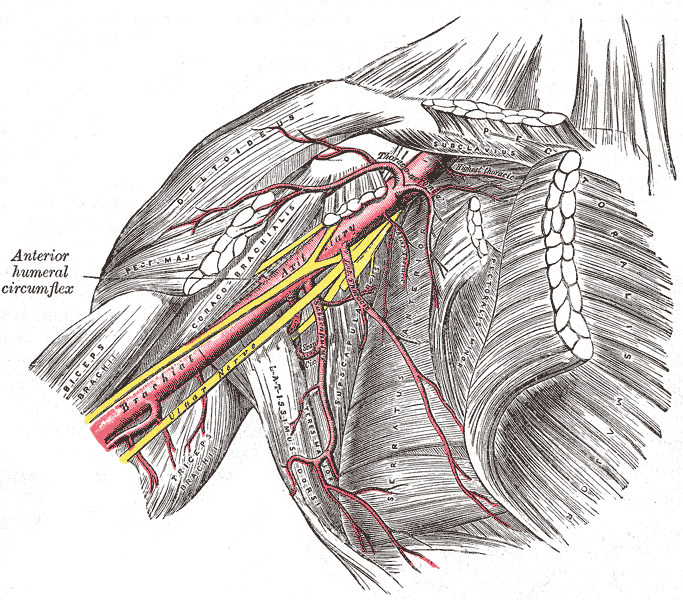
- Axillary artery and its branches - anterior view of right upper limb and thorax (axillary sheath not labeled, but region is visible)

The axillary sheath is a fibrous sheath that encloses the axillary artery and the three cords of the brachial plexus to form the neurovascular bundle. It is surrounded by the axillary fat. It is an extension of the prevertebral fascia of the deep cervical fascia and is continuous with the carotid sheath at the venous angle.

A brachial plexus nerve block can be achieved by injecting anaesthetic into this area.
