= Mylohyoid line =

Bony ridge on the inner surface of the body of the mandible

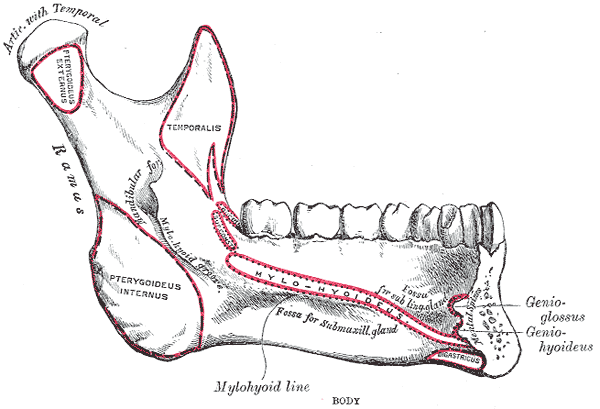
- Mandible. Inner surface. Side view.

Details
- Part of: Mandible
- System: Skeletal

Identifiers
- Latin: linea mylohyoidea mandibulae
- TA98: A02.1.15.012
- TA2: 848
- FMA: 53119

The mylohyoid line is a bony ridge on the internal surface of the mandible. It runs posterosuperiorly. It is the site of origin of the mylohyoid muscle, the superior pharyngeal constrictor muscle, and the pterygomandibular raphe.

== Structure ==
The mylohyoid line is a bony ridge on the internal surface of the body of the mandible. The mylohyoid line extends posterosuperiorly. The mylohyoid line continues as the mylohyoid groove on the internal surface of the ramus.

The mylohyoid muscle originates from the anterior (front) part of the mylohyoid line. Rarely, the mylohyoid muscle may originate partially from other surfaces of the mandible. The posterior (back) part of this line, near the alveolar margin, gives attachment to a small part of the superior pharyngeal constrictor muscle, and to the pterygomandibular raphe.

== Function ==
The mylohyoid line is the site of attachment of many muscles, including the mylohyoid muscle, and the superior pharyngeal constrictor muscle. It is also the site of attachment of the pterygomandibular raphe.

== Additional images ==
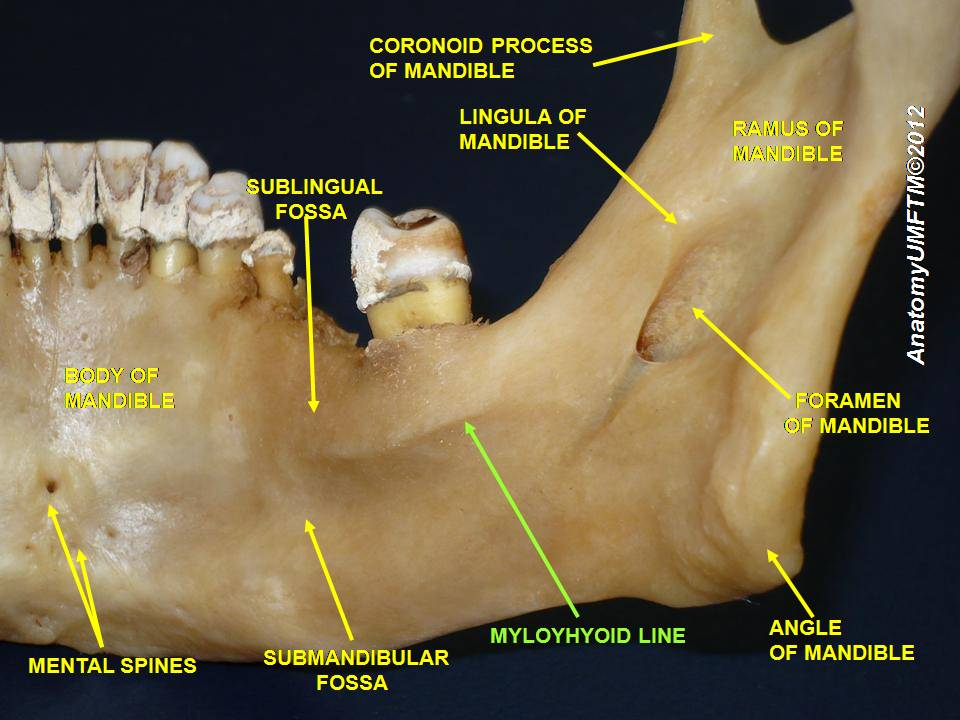
Mylohyoid line
