= Sail (anatomy) =

The term sail or dorsal sail has been used to refer to sail-like structures on the back of various animals. Such animals can also be referred to as sail-backed or fin-backed. Such structures include the following:

- Neural spine sail – formed by the neural spines of the vertebrae
- Dorsal fin – in some aquatic species with tall fins on their back.
- Crest (anatomy) – a feature which has been referred to as a "sail" when occurring on the back of some animals
