= Pterygoid hamulus =

Hook-like process of the sphenoid bone of the skull

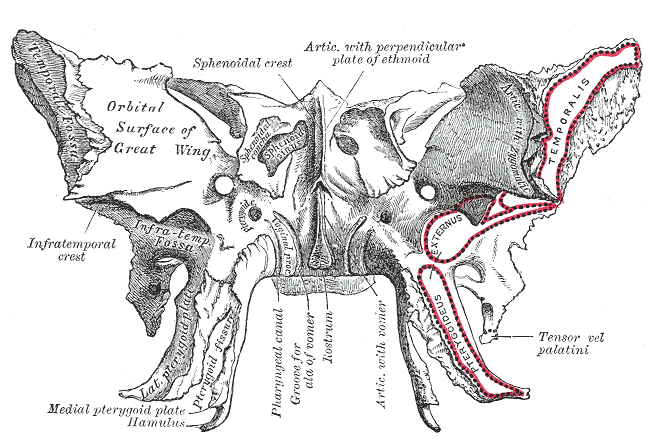
- Sphenoid bone. Anterior and inferior surfaces. (Hamulus labeled at bottom left.)

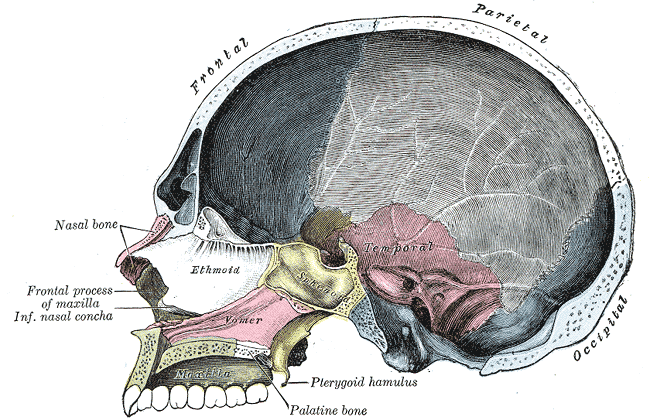
- Sagittal section of skull. (Sphenoid is in yellow, and pterygoid hamulus labeled at bottom center.)

Details
- Part of: Sphenoid bone of skull
- System: Skeletal

Identifiers
- Latin: hamulus pterygoideus
- TA98: A02.1.05.051
- TA2: 637
- FMA: 54722

The pterygoid hamulus is a hook-like process at the lower extremity of the medial pterygoid plate of the sphenoid bone of the skull. It is the superior origin of the pterygomandibular raphe, and the tensor veli palatini muscle courses around it before inserting into the palatine aponeurosis.

== Structure ==
The pterygoid hamulus is part of the medial pterygoid plate of the sphenoid bone of the skull. Its tip is rounded off. It has an average length of 7.2 mm, an average depth of 1.4 mm, and an average width of 2.3 mm. The tendon of tensor veli palatini muscle glides around it.

== Function ==
The pterygoid hamulus is the superior origin of the pterygomandibular raphe.

== Clinical significance ==
Rarely, the pterygoid hamulus may be enlarged, which may cause mouth pain.

== See also ==
- Hamulus
