= Crest (anatomy) =

A crest is any of various anatomical features appearing as a raised point or ridge, most prominently those on the head or back of an animal.

- A part of a bone:
  - Sagittal crest
  - Cnemial crest
  - Iliac crest
  - Frontal crest
  - Infratemporal crest
  - Anterior lacrimal crest
  - Posterior lacrimal crest
  - Buccinator crest
- A feature on various animals:
  - Crest (feathers)
  - Display feature or thermoregulatory feature in various reptiles
  - Sail (anatomy), also known as crest in some animals
  - The point of a horse's neck where the mane grows from
- Neural crest, a temporary group of cells unique to vertebrates that arise from the embryonic ectoderm cell layer
