= Prevertebral space =

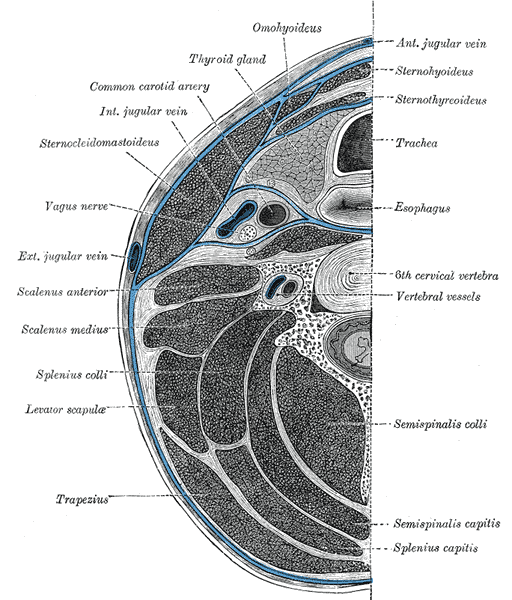
- Section of the neck at about the level of the sixth cervical vertebra. Showing the arrangement of the fascia coli.

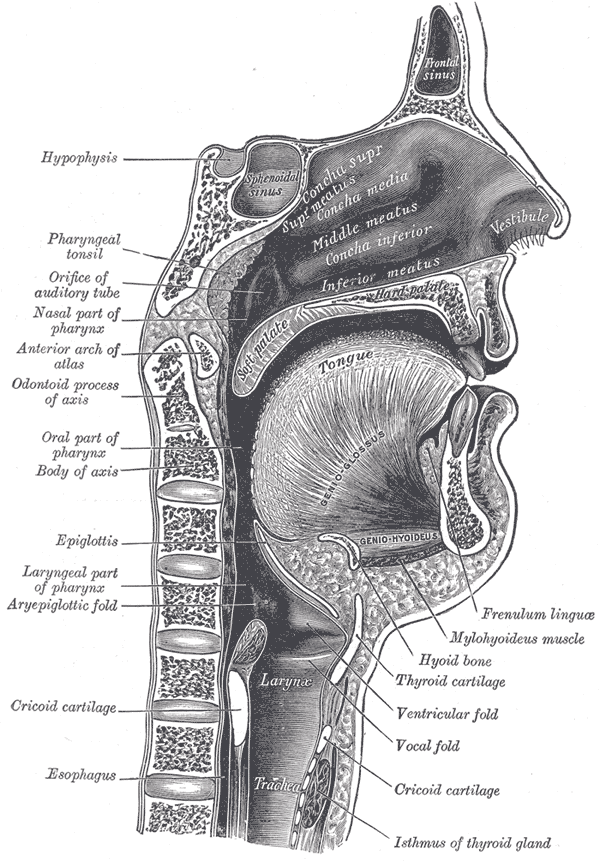
- Sagittal section of nose mouth, pharynx, and larynx.

The prevertebral space is a space in the neck.

On one side it is bounded by the prevertebral fascia.

On the other side, some sources define it as bounded by the vertebral bodies, and others define it as bounded by the longus colli.

It includes the prevertebral muscles (longus colli and longus capitis), vertebral artery, vertebral vein, scalene muscles, phrenic nerve and part of the brachial plexus.

In trauma, an increased thickness of the prevertebral space is a sign of injury, and can be measured with medical imaging.

== Clinical significance ==
On plain radiography, prevertebral space should be less than 6 mm at C3 vertebral level in children; while in adults, the space should be less than 6 mm at C2 level and less than 22 mm at C6 level. Causes of enlarged prevertebral space could be edema, hematoma, abscess, tumors, and post surgical changes.

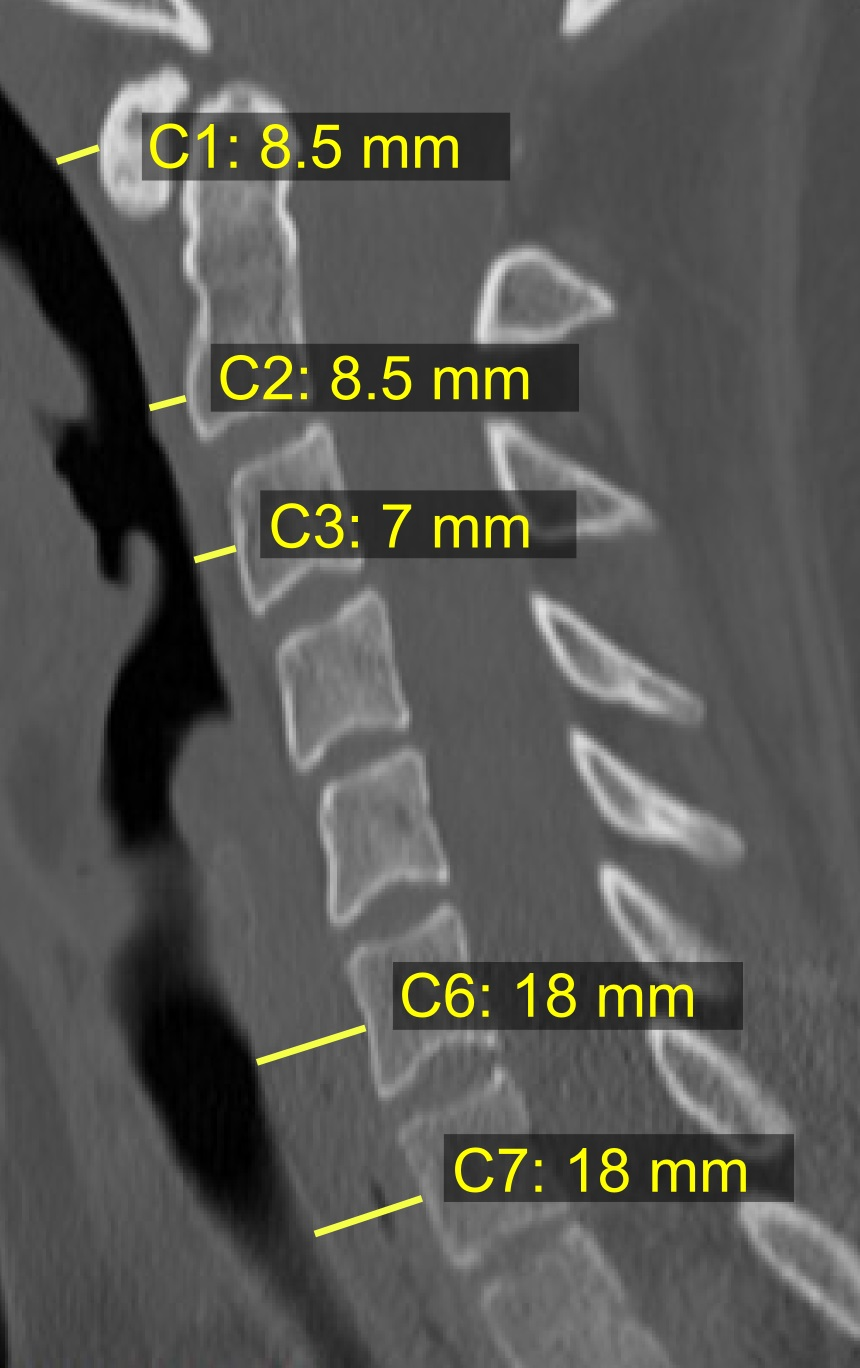
CT scan with upper limits of the thickness of the prevertebral space at different levels.
