= Buccinator crest =

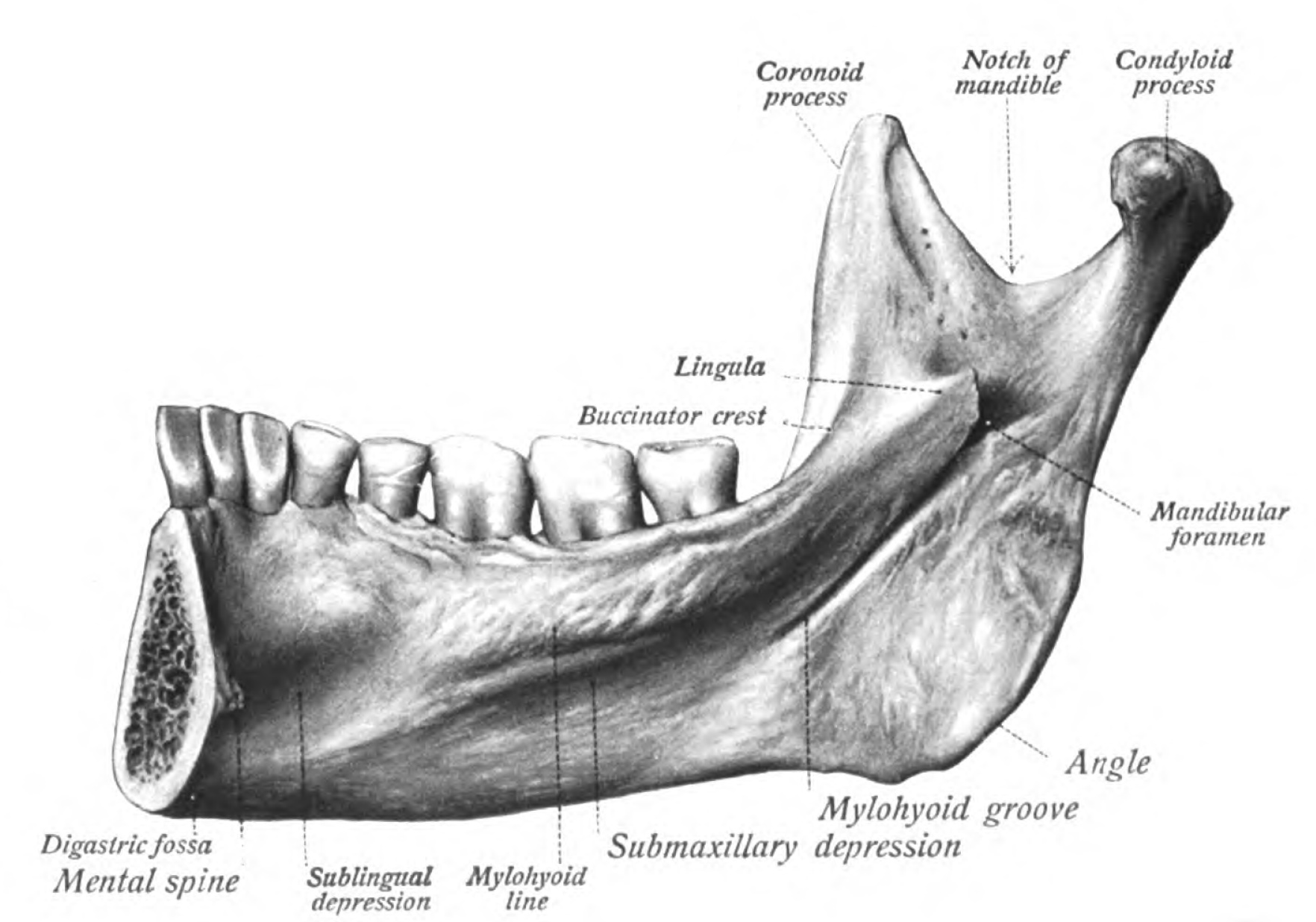
Interior of the mandible, side view. The buccinator crest can be seen posteriorly to the third molar.

The buccinator crest (Latin crista buccinatoria) is a bony crest of the human mandible, that passes from the base of the coronoid process to the area of the third molar. The alveolar border of the buccinator muscle attaches upon it.
