= Investing layer of deep cervical fascia =

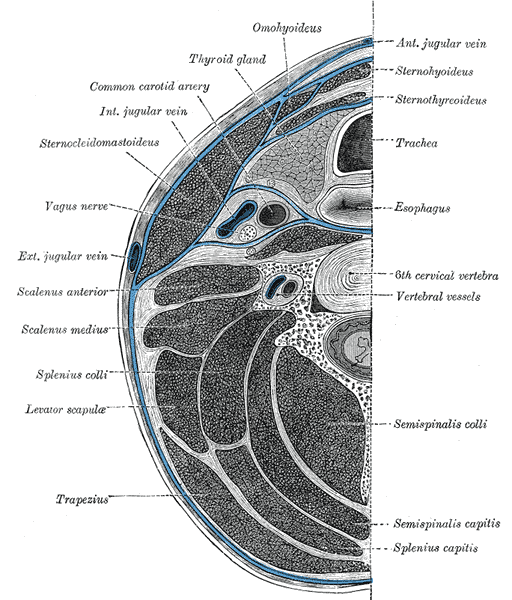
- Section of the neck at about the level of the sixth cervical vertebra. Showing the arrangement of the fascia coli.

Details

Identifiers
- Latin: lamina superficialis fasciae cervicalis
- TA98: A04.2.05.002
- TA2: 2207
- FMA: 57805

The investing layer of deep cervical fascia is the most superficial part of the deep cervical fascia, and encloses the whole neck.

It is considered by some sources to be incomplete or nonexistent.

== Attachments ==
It surrounds the neck like a collar, it splits around the sternocleidomastoid muscle and the trapezius muscle. It is attached as;

- Posteriorly - Ligamentum nuchae
- Anteriorly - Attached to the hyoid bone
- Superiorly - (from backwards to forwards);
  - External occipital protuberance and superior nuchal line of occipital bone
  - Mastoid process of temporal bone
  - External acoustic meatus
  - Lower margin of the zygomatic arch
  - Lower border of body of mandible from the angle of mandible to the symphysis menti
- Inferiorly - (from backwards to forwards);
  - Spine and acromial process of scapula
  - Upper surface of the clavicle
  - Suprasternal notch of manubrium sterni

== Tracings ==
- Horizontal extent - From ligamentum nuchae when traced forward, the fascia splits and encloses trapezius, reunites and form roof of posterior triangle of neck; again splits and encloses sternocleidomastoid, reunites and forms the roof of anterior triangle.
- Vertical extent -
  - Superior tracing -
    - It splits and encloses submandibular gland and parotid gland;
    - It splits at lower border of submandibular gland into superficial and deep layers, which attach to lower body and mylohyoid line of mandible
    - It splits at lower pole of parotid gland into superficial and deep layers; superficial layer attaches to zygomatic arch and forms parotido-masseteric fascia after blending with masseter, while the deep layer attaches to tympanic plate and styloid process to form the stylomandibular ligament
  - Inferior tracing - The fascia splits to enclose two spaces; suprasternal space and supraclavicular space
