= Prevertebral muscles =

Group of muscles of the neck

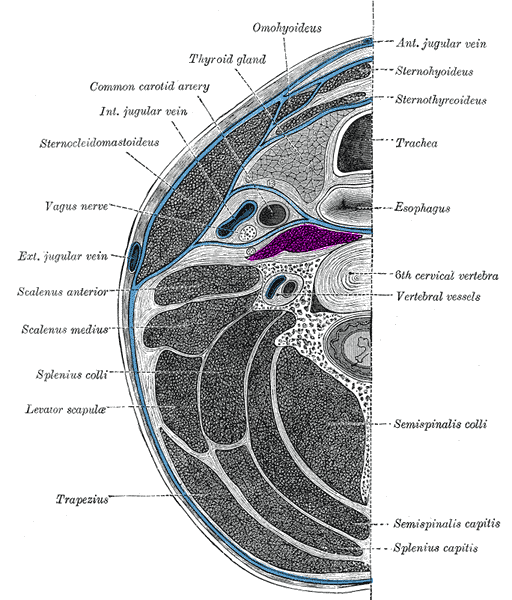
- Transverse section of neck. Prevertebral muscles labeled in purple.

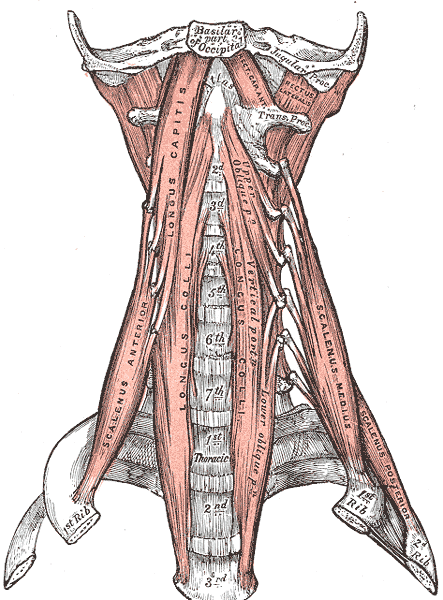
- The anterior vertebral muscles.

Details
- Nerve: C1-C8

Identifiers
- FMA: 32514

The prevertebral muscles are the muscles located between the prevertebral fascia (older definition) and the vertebral column, i.e., the longus capitis, longus colli, rectus capitis anterior, and rectus capitis lateralis muscles.

== See also ==
- Prevertebral space
