= Retropharyngeal abscess =

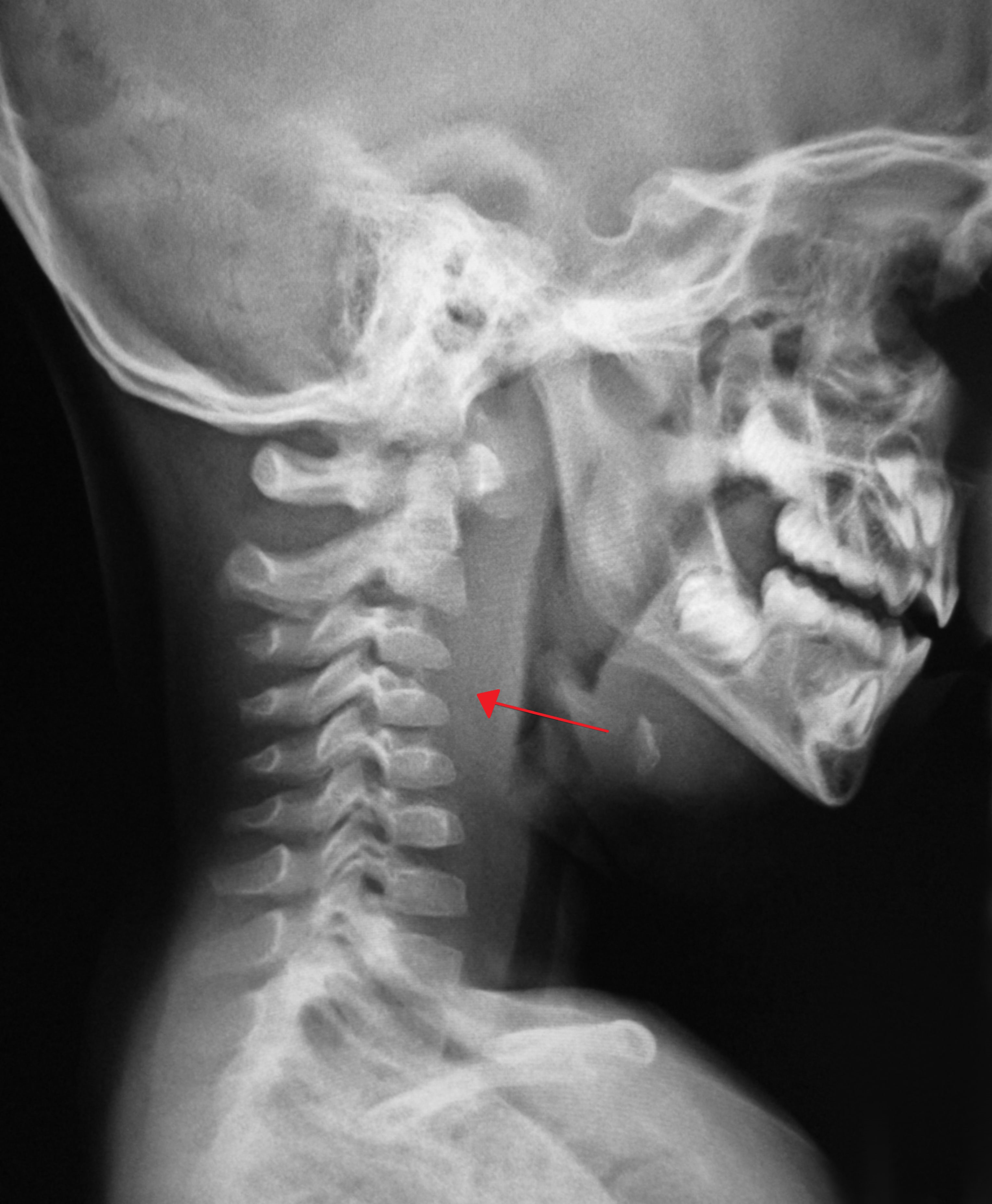
- A lateral cervical spine X-ray demonstrating prevertebral soft tissue swelling (marked by the arrow) as seen in a person with a retropharyngeal abscess
- Specialty: Otorhinolaryngology

Retropharyngeal abscess (RPA) is an abscess located in the tissues in the back of the throat behind the posterior pharyngeal wall (the retropharyngeal space). Because RPAs typically occur in deep tissue, they are difficult to diagnose by physical examination alone. RPA is a relatively uncommon illness, and therefore may not receive early diagnosis in children presenting with stiff neck, malaise, difficulty swallowing, or other symptoms listed below. Early diagnosis is key, while a delay in diagnosis and treatment may lead to death. Parapharyngeal space communicates with retropharyngeal space and an infection of retropharyngeal space can pass down behind the esophagus into the mediastinum. RPAs can also occur in adults of any age.

RPA can lead to airway obstruction or sepsis – both life-threatening emergencies. Fatalities normally occur from patients not receiving treatment immediately and suffocating prior to knowing that anything serious was wrong.

== Signs and symptoms ==
Signs and symptoms may include the following stiff neck (limited neck mobility or torticollis), some form of palpable neck pain (may be in "front of the neck" or around the Adam's apple), malaise, difficulty swallowing, fever, stridor, drooling, croup-like cough or enlarged cervical lymph nodes. Any combination of these symptoms should arouse suspicion of RPA.

== Causes ==
RPA is usually caused by a bacterial infection originating from the nasopharynx, tonsils, sinuses, adenoids, molar teeth or middle ear. Any upper respiratory infection (URI) can be a cause. RPA can also result from a direct infection due to penetrating injury or a foreign body. RPA can also be linked to young children who do not have adequate dental care or brush their teeth properly.

== Diagnosis ==
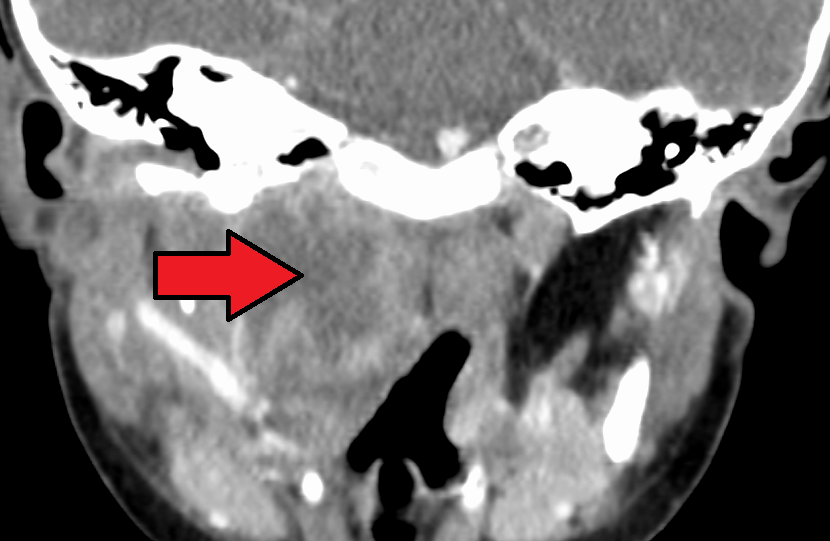
Large retropharyngeal abscess as seen on CT

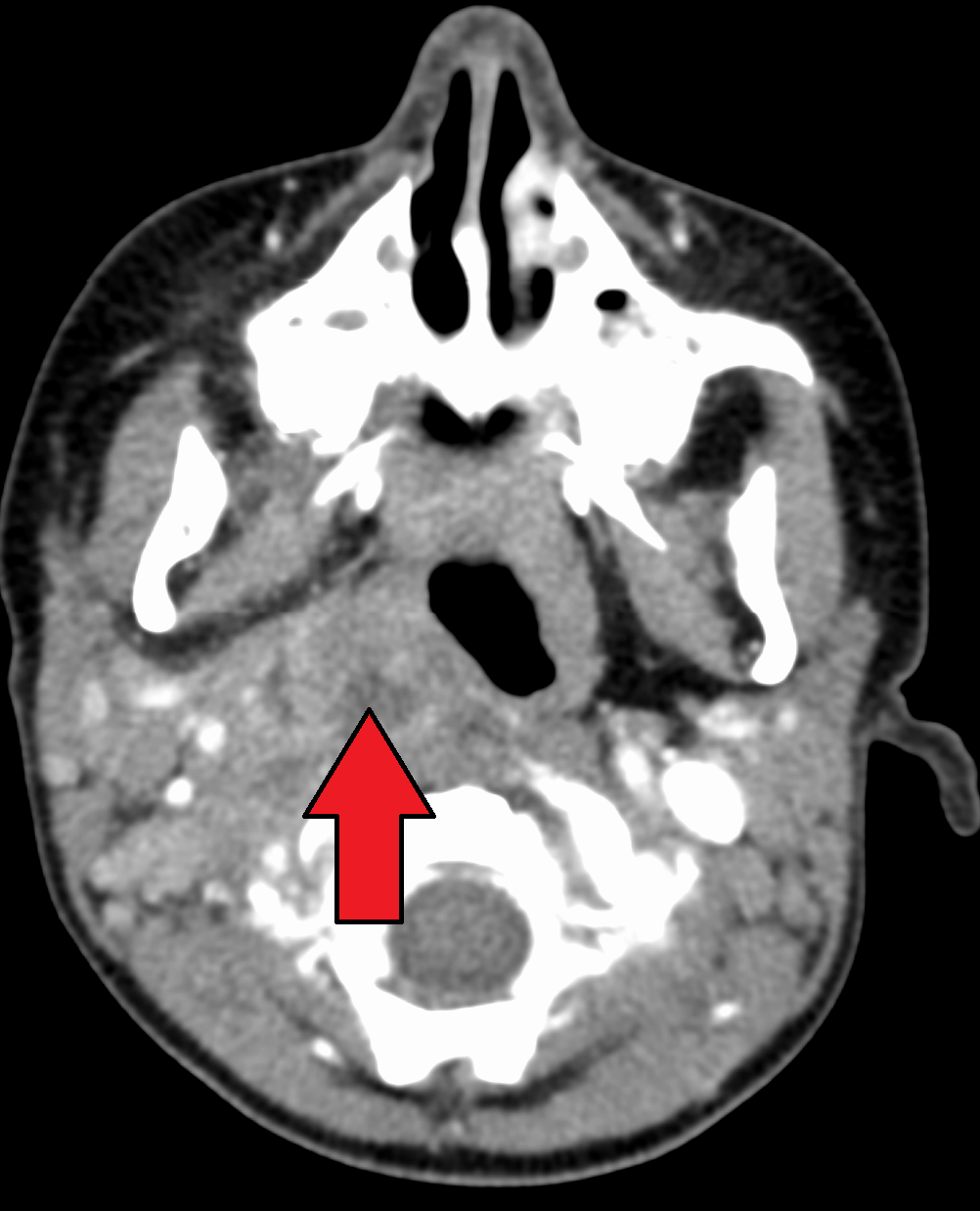
Large retropharyngeal abscess as seen on CT

A computed tomography (CT) scan is the definitive diagnostic imaging test.

X-ray of the neck often (80% of the time) shows swelling of the retropharyngeal space in affected individuals. If the retropharyngeal space is more than half of the size of the C2 vertebra, it may indicate retropharyngeal abscess.

== Treatment ==
RPAs frequently require surgical intervention. A tonsillectomy approach is typically used to access/drain the abscess, and the outcome is usually positive. Surgery in adults may be done without general anesthesia because there is a risk of abscess rupture during tracheal intubation. This could result in pus from the abscess aspirated into the lungs. In complex cases, an emergency tracheotomy may be required to prevent upper airway obstruction caused by edema in the neck.

High-dose intravenous antibiotics are required in order to control the infection and reduce the size of the abscess prior to surgery. Chronic retropharyngeal abscess is usually secondary to tuberculosis and the patient needs to be started on anti-tubercular therapy as soon as possible.
