= Alar fascia =

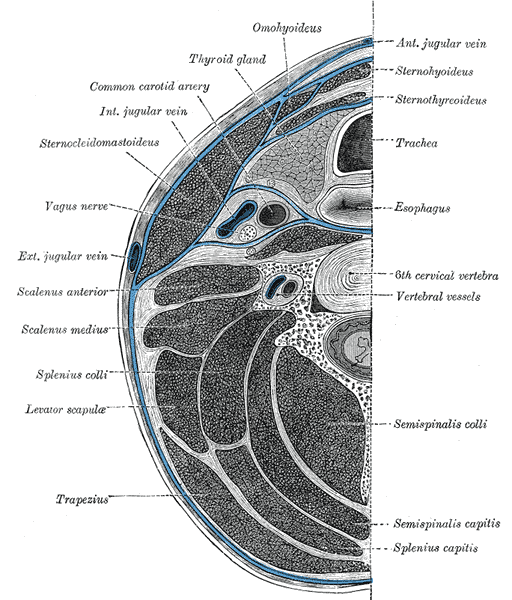
- Section of the neck at about the level of the sixth cervical vertebra. Showing the arrangement of the fascia coli.

Details

Identifiers
- Latin: lamina alaris fasciae cervicalis
- TA2: 2217

The alar fascia a portion of prevertebral fascia that may or may not be considered a distinct anatomical structure. When acknowledged, it is described as anterior to the prevertebral fascia.

== Anatomy ==
Superiorly, it extends to the base of the skull; inferiorly, it extends to the second thoracic vertebra. Inferiorly, it unites with the visceral fascia of the neck.

=== Anatomical relations ===
The alar fascia represents the posterior boundary of the retropharyngeal space.

=== Research ===
In 2015, the anatomy of the alar fascia was revisited using dissection in conjunction with E12 plastination. The authors revealed that the alar fascia originated as a well defined midline structure at the level of C1 and does not reach the base of the skull. It is suggested that the area between C1 and the base of the skull is a potential entry into the danger space.

== See also ==
- Retrovisceral space
