= Pterygomandibular raphe =

Ligament formed from the buccopharyngeal fascia

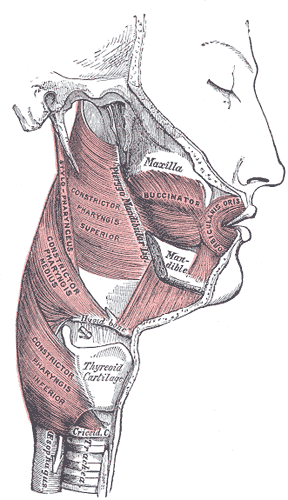
- Muscles of the pharynx and cheek. (Pterygo-Mandibular ligament labeled at center, vertically.)

Details
- Part of: Buccopharyngeal fascia
- Origin: Pterygoid hamulus of the medial pterygoid plate
- Insertion: Mylohyoid line of the mandible

Identifiers
- Latin: raphe pterygomandibularis
- TA98: A05.3.01.102
- TA2: 2178
- FMA: 55618

The pterygomandibular raphe (pterygomandibular fold or pterygomandibular ligament) is a thin tendinous band of buccopharyngeal fascia. It is attached superiorly to the pterygoid hamulus of the medial pterygoid plate, and inferiorly to the posterior end of the mylohyoid line of the mandible. It gives attachment to the buccinator muscle (in front), and the superior pharyngeal constrictor muscle (behind).

== Structure ==
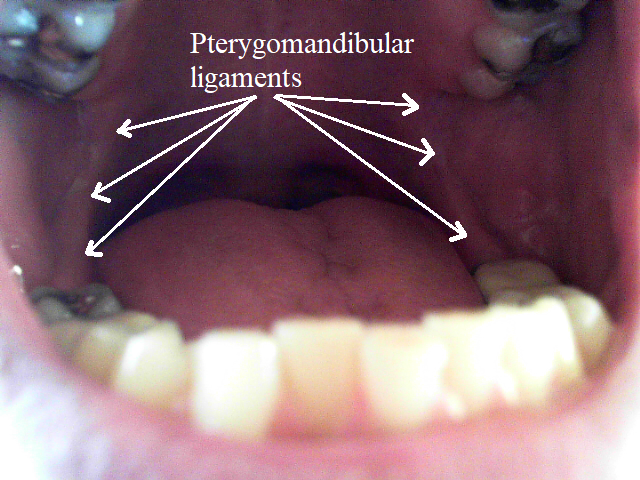
Open mouth, view from front. The pterygomandibular ligaments are marked with arrows. Note that in this mouth the lower wisdom teeth have been removed, slightly changing the shape of the pterygomandibular ligaments that usually curve and attach to the mandible around them.

The pterygomandibular raphe is a tendinous band formed by the buccopharyngeal fascia. It is a paired structure, with one on each side of the mouth. Superiorly, it is attached to the pterygoid hamulus of the medial pterygoid plate of the sphenoid bone; inferiorly, it is attached to the posterior end of the mylohyoid line of the mandible.

=== Relations ===
- Its medial surface is covered by the mucous membrane of the mouth.
- Its lateral surface is separated from the ramus of the mandible by adipose tissue.
- Its posterior border gives attachment to the superior pharyngeal constrictor muscle.
- Its anterior border attaches to the posterior edge of the buccinator muscle.

The pterygomandibular raphe is the common meeting point of the superior pharyngeal constrictor muscle and the buccinator muscle. This common attachment makes the raphe a junction of the oral cavity, oropharynx, and nasopharynx.

The inferior alveolar nerve passes lateral to the raphe; the raphe is therefore a landmark for a nerve block of this nerve.

The general location of the raphe is indicated by the pterygomandibular fold.

=== Attachments ===
The pterygomandibular raphe gives attachment to the central portion of the buccinator muscle anteriorly, and to the superior pharyngeal constrictor muscle posteriorly.

=== Variation ===
In foetuses, the pterygomandibular raphe is always very prominent. However, in adults, it may become less distinctive. It is very large and distinctive, in around 36% adults. It is fairly small, and only an upper triangular portion visible, in around 36% of adults. It is not visible in around 28%, making the superior pharyngeal constrictor muscle and the buccinator muscle continuous. This may vary by ethnic group.

== Clinical significance ==
When the mandible is splinted for gradual realignment (such as to treat sleep apnea), the pterygomandibular ligament slightly resists the realignment.

The raphe is a landmark for administration of inferior alveolar nerve blocks.

== History ==
The pterygomandibular ligament was first noted in 1784.

== See also ==
- Raphe
