= Carotid sheath =

Part of neck anatomy

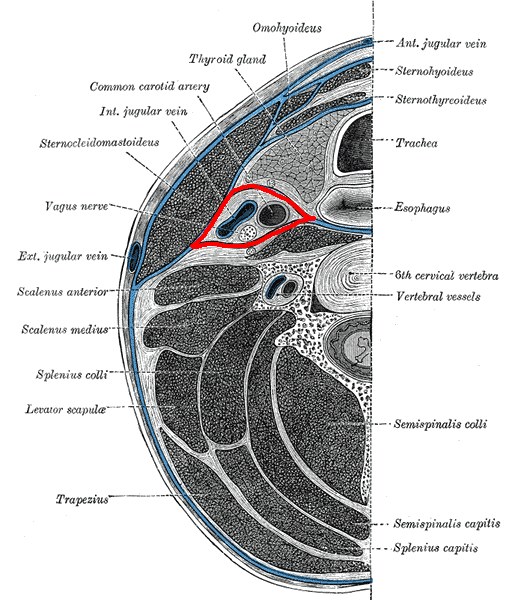
- Section of the neck at about the level of the sixth cervical vertebra. Showing the arrangement of the fascia coli. Carotid sheath is labeled in red.

Details

Identifiers
- Latin: vagina carotica fasciae cervicalis
- TA98: A04.2.05.007
- TA2: 2214
- FMA: 46561

The carotid sheath is a condensation of the deep cervical fascia enveloping multiple vital neurovascular structures of the neck, including the common and internal carotid arteries, the internal jugular vein, the vagus nerve (CN X), and ansa cervicalis. The carotid sheath helps protects the structures contained therein.

== Anatomy ==
One carotid sheath is situated on each side of the neck, extending between the base of the skull superiorly and the thorax inferiorly.

Superiorly, the carotid sheath encircles the margins of the carotid canal and jugular foramen.

Inferiorly, it terminates at the arch of the aorta; it is continuous inferiorly with the axillary sheath at the venous angle. Its inferior end occurs at the level of the first rib and sternum inferiorly (varying between the levels of C7 and T4).

=== Structure ===
The carotid sheath is a fibrous connective tissue formation surrounding several important structures of the neck. It is thicker around the arteries than around the vein, allowing the vein to expand.

The three major fascial layers in the neck contribute to the carotid sheath: the investing fascia, the pretracheal fascia, and the prevertebral fascia. The carotid sheath has limited loose connective tissue.

=== Contents ===
Structures contained within the carotid sheath include the:

- common carotid artery and internal carotid artery,
- internal jugular vein,
- vagus nerve (CN X) and recurrent laryngeal nerve,
- parts of glossopharyngeal (CN IX), accessory (CN XI), and hypoglossal (CN XII) cranial nerves (these cranial nerves are only present in the upper part of the carotid sheath and subsequently exit the carotid sheath),
- ansa cervicalis (usually embedded within the anterior wall of the carotid sheath anterior to the internal jugular vein; the superior root of ansa cervicalis is situated either anterior to or within the carotid sheath),
- deep cervical lymph nodes

=== Relations ===
The carotid sheath occurs at the level of the oropharynx.

The cervical sympathetic trunk is situated posteriormedial to the carotid sheath.

The carotid sheath is situated at each lateral boundary of the retropharyngeal space, deep to the sternocleidomastoid muscle.

The pharynx is situated medial to the carotid sheath, (in the suprahyoid region) the parotid gland laterally to it, in the suprahyoid region the infratemporal fossa anterior to it, and the prevertebral fascia posterior to it.

== Function ==
The carotid sheath acts to protect and separate the structures contained within.

== Clinical significance ==
The carotid sheath may act as a conduit for infections, although this is rare due to the limited connective tissue.

== Additional images ==
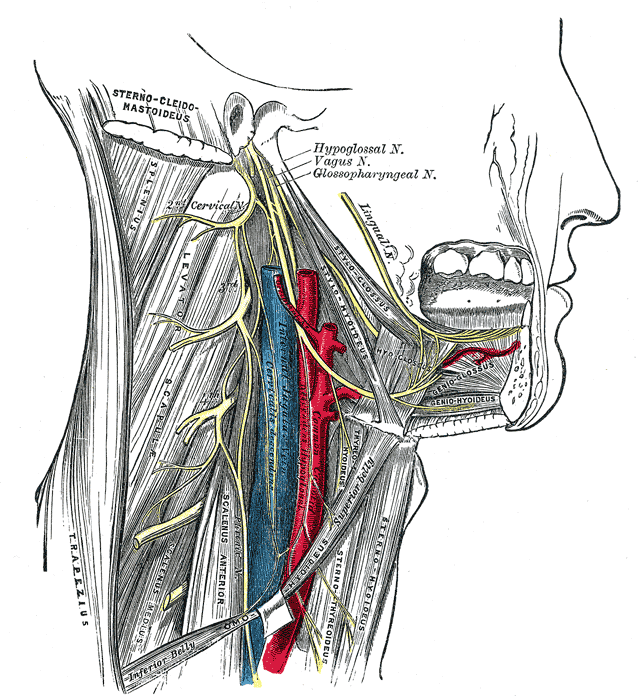
Hypoglossal nerve, cervical plexus, and their branches.

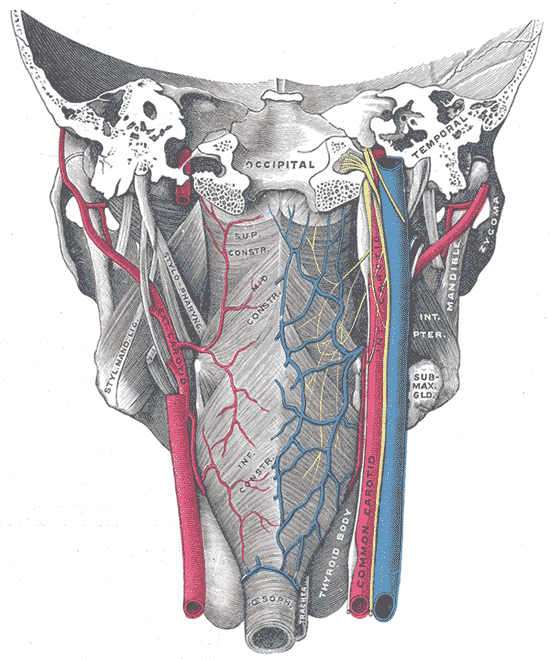
Muscles of the pharynx, viewed from behind, together with the associated vessels and nerves.

== See also ==
- Axillary fascia
