= Retropharyngeal space =

Potential space in the neck

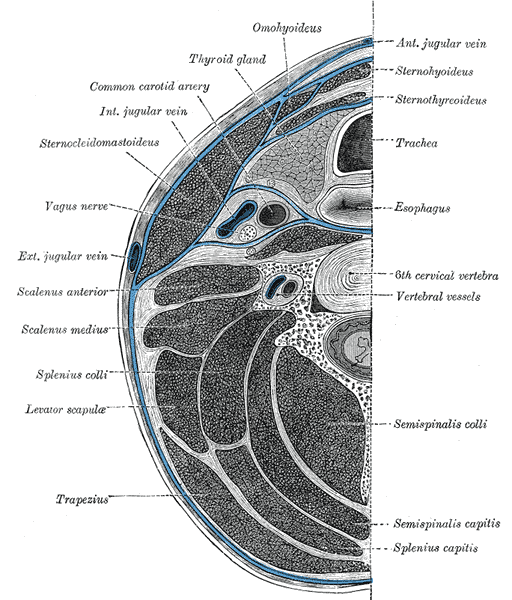
- Section of the neck at about the level of the sixth cervical vertebra. Showing the arrangement of the deep cervical fascia

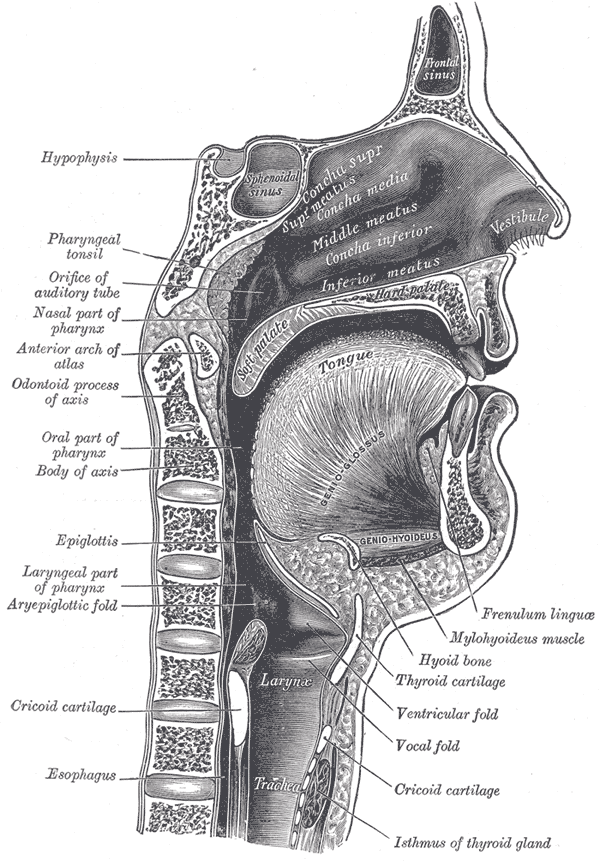
- Sagittal section of nose, mouth, pharynx and larynx

Details

Identifiers
- Latin: spatium retropharyngeum
- TA98: A05.3.01.118
- TA2: 2884
- FMA: 84965

The retropharyngeal space (abbreviated as "RPS") is a potential space and deep compartment of the head and neck situated posterior to the pharynx. The RPS is bounded anteriorly by the buccopharyngeal fascia, posteriorly by the alar fascia, and laterally by the carotid sheath. It extends between the base of the skull superiorly, and the mediastinum inferiorly. It contains the retropharyngeal lymph nodes. Its function is to facilitate movements in the superoinferior axis of the larynx, pharynx, and esophagus in relation to the cervical spine.

Sources consider the retropharyngeal space to be in principle subdivided into the so-called "true retropharyngeal space" or "retropharyngeal space proper" (part of the RPS situated anterior to the alar fascia), and the danger space (part of the RPS situated posterior to the alar fascia). The danger space is sometimes also lumped together with the true RPS and the whole referred to as the RPS because the alar fascia is an ineffective barrier. Infections from the head and neck can spread down through the danger space into the posterior mediastinum.

== Anatomy ==
Superiorly, the retropharyngeal space terminates at the base of the skull (more specifically, at the clivus). Inferiorly, the true RPS terminates at a variable level along the upper thoracic spine with the fusion of alar fascia and visceral fascia; sources either give the inferior termination of the true RPS as occurring at approximately the vertebral level of T4 or at a variable level anywhere between the T1-T6. The danger space component of the RPS meanwhile extends further inferiorly, entering the posterior mediastinum to reach the level of the diaphragm. The retropharyngeal space drains into the superior mediastinum, whereas the danger space drains into the posterior mediastinum.

=== Contents ===
The retropharyngeal space contains the retropharyngeal lymph nodes, adipose tissue, and loose connective tissue. The suprahyoid portion of the RPS contains the lymph nodes as well as adipose tissue, while the infrahyoid portion contains adipose tissue only.

A midline raphe is sometimes present in the RPS, subdividing it into a left half and a right half.

=== Anatomical relations ===
Positions of adjacent anatomical structures in relation to the retropharyngeal space are as follows:

- Superior: Base of the skull
- Inferior: Posterior mediastinum
- Lateral: Carotid sheath
- Anterior: Buccopharyngeal fascia
- Posterior: Prevertebral fascia (alar fascia true RPS)

== Clinical significance ==
A midline raphe may be present in this the RPS, making some infections appear unilateral. However without treatment infections can easily spread from one space to the adjacent space.

If more than half of the size of the C2 vertebra, it may indicate retropharyngeal abscess.

== Additional images ==
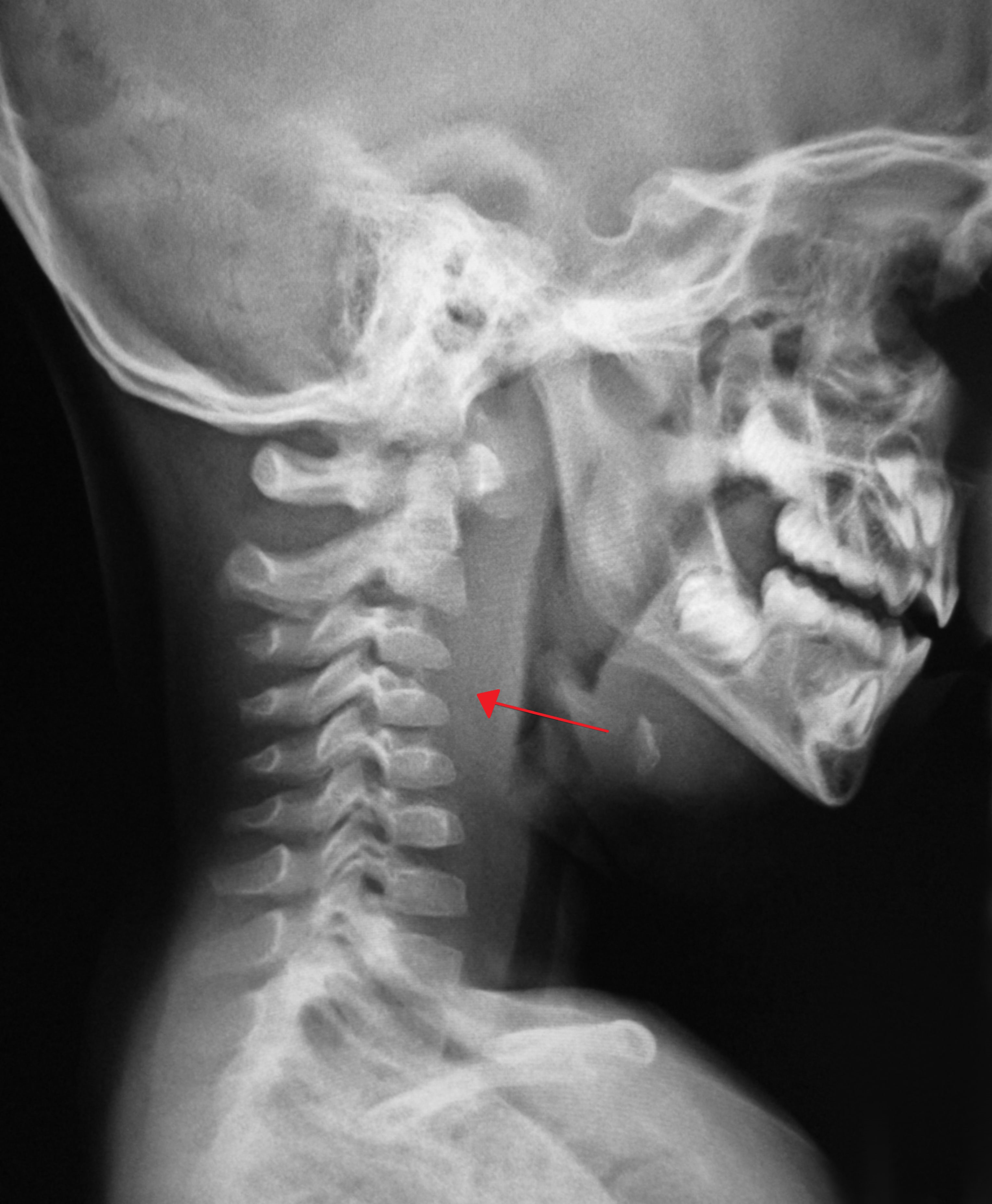
Retropharyngeal abscess

== See also ==
- Parapharyngeal space
