= Deep cervical fascia =

Anatomical structure in the human neck

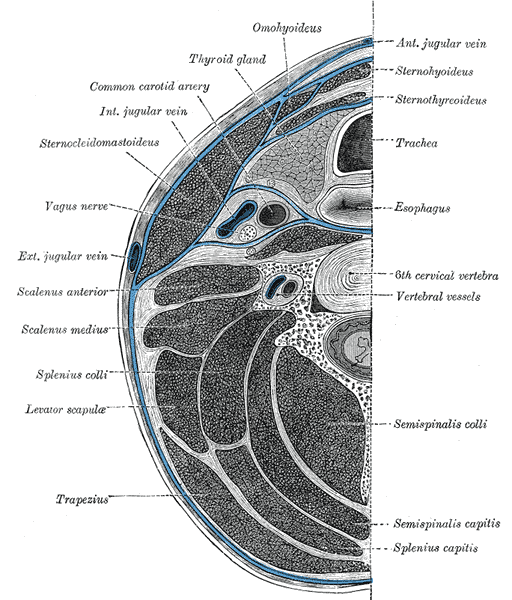
- Section of the neck at about the level of the sixth cervical vertebra. Showing the arrangement of the fascia colli.

The deep cervical fascia (or fascia colli in older texts) lies under cover of the platysma, and invests the muscles of the neck; it also forms sheaths for the carotid vessels, and for the structures situated in front of the vertebral column. Its attachment to the hyoid bone prevents the formation of a dewlap.

The investing portion of the fascia is attached behind to the ligamentum nuchæ and to the spinous process of the seventh cervical vertebra.

The alar fascia is a portion of the deep cervical fascia.

== Divisions ==
The deep cervical fascia is often divided into a superficial, middle, and deep layer.

The superficial layer is also known as the investing layer of deep cervical fascia. It envelops the trapezius, sternocleidomastoid, and muscles of facial expression. It also contains the submandibular and parotid salivary gland as well as the muscles of mastication (the masseter, pterygoid, and temporalis muscles).

The middle layer is also known as the pretracheal fascia. It envelopes the strap muscles (sternohyoid, sternothyroid, thyrohyoid, and omohyoid muscles). It also surrounds the pharynx, larynx, trachea, esophagus, thyroid, parathyroids, buccinators, and constrictor muscles of the pharynx.

The deep layer is also known as the prevertebral fascia. It surrounds the paraspinous muscles and cervical vertebrae.

The carotid sheath is also considered a component of the deep cervical fascia.

== Superior extent of the investing fascia ==
Above, the fascia is attached to the superior nuchal line of the occipital bone, to the mastoid process of the temporal bone, and to the whole length of the inferior border of the body of the mandible.

Opposite the angle of the mandible the fascia is very strong, and binds the anterior edge of the sternocleidomastoideus firmly to that bone.

Between the mandible and the mastoid process it ensheathes the parotid gland—the layer which covers the gland extends upward under the name of the parotideomasseteric fascia and is fixed to the zygomatic arch. It also contributes to the sheath of the digastric.

At the level of the jaw, it splits to enclose the submandibular gland, with the upper leaflet inserting on the mylohyoid line just inferior to mylohyoid and the inferior leaflet inserting onto the lower margin of the jaw. The posterior portion of the upper leaflet helps separate the parotid gland from the submandibular gland where the mylohyoid is deficient while the posterior border is thickened into a strong band extending between the angle of the jaw and the temporal styloid process, forming the stylomandibular ligament. It is complemented by the pterygospinous ligament, which stretches from the upper part of the posterior border of the lateral pterygoid plate to the spinous process of the sphenoid. It occasionally ossifies, and in such cases, between its upper border and the base of the skull, a foramen is formed which transmits the branches of the mandibular nerve to the muscles of mastication.

== Inferior extent of the investing fascia ==
Below, the fascia is attached to the thoracic outlet (acromion, clavicle, and manubrium). In doing so, it bifurcates into two layers, superficial and deep.

The former is attached to the anterior border of the manubrium, the latter to its posterior border and to the interclavicular ligament.

Between these two layers is a slit-like interval, the suprasternal space (space of Burns); it contains a small quantity of areolar tissue, the lower portions of the anterior jugular veins and their transverse connecting branch, the sternal heads of the sternocleidomastoid, and sometimes a lymph gland.

== Deeper fascial layers ==
The fascia which lines the deep surface of the sternocleidomastoideus gives off the following processes:

- A process envelops the tendon at the omohyoideus, and binds it down to the sternum and first costal cartilage.
- A strong sheath, the carotid sheath, encloses the carotid artery, internal jugular vein, and vagus nerve.
- The prevertebral fascia extends medialward behind the carotid vessels, where it assists in forming their sheath, and passes in front of the prevertebral muscles.
- The pretracheal fascia extends medially in front of the carotid vessels, and assists in forming the carotid sheath.
