= Longus colli muscle =

Vertebral muscle

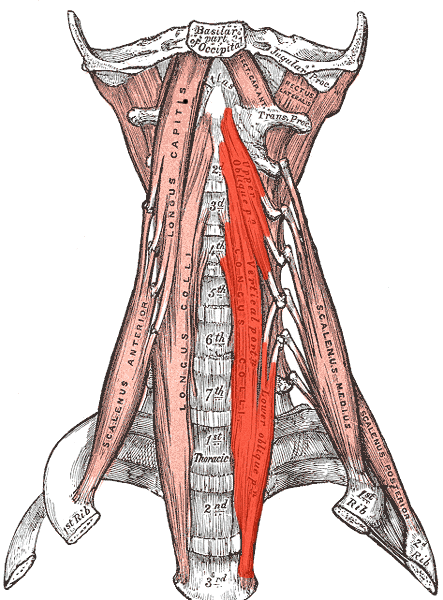
- The anterior vertebral muscles. (Longus colli labeled vertically at center left and center right.)

Details
- Origin: Transverse processes of C5 to T3
- Insertion: Anterior arch of the atlas
- Artery: Ascending pharyngeal artery and vertebral arteries
- Nerve: C2–C6
- Actions: Flexes the neck and head

Identifiers
- Latin: musculus longus colli
- TA98: A04.2.01.002
- TA2: 2148
- FMA: 13370

The longus colli muscle (Latin for long muscle of the neck) is a muscle of the human body.

The longus colli is situated on the anterior surface of the vertebral column, between the atlas and the third thoracic vertebra.

It is broad in the middle, narrow and pointed at either end, and consists of three portions, a superior oblique, an inferior oblique, and a vertical.

- The superior oblique portion arises from the anterior tubercles of the transverse processes of the third, fourth, and fifth cervical vertebrae and, ascending obliquely with a medial inclination, is inserted by a narrow tendon into the tubercle on the anterior arch of the atlas.
- The inferior oblique portion, the smallest part of the muscle, arises from the front of the bodies of the first two or three thoracic vertebrae; and, ascending obliquely in a lateral direction, is inserted into the anterior tubercles of the transverse processes of the fifth and sixth cervical vertebrae.
- The vertical portion arises, below, from the front of the bodies of the upper three thoracic and lower three cervical vertebrae, and is inserted into the front of the bodies of the second, third, and fourth cervical vertebrae.

== Clinical significance ==
It is commonly injured in rear end whiplash injuries, usually resulting from a car crash.

This muscle is in front of the spine and is thought by some scientists that it may cause some whiplash patients to have an unnatural lack of curvature in the patients' neck.

Acute calcific tendinitis of the longus colli muscle can occur. This presents with acute onset of neck pain, stiffness, dysphagia and odynophagia, and must be distinguished from retropharyngeal abscess and other sinister conditions. Imaging diagnosis is by CT or MRI, demonstrating calcification in the muscle in addition to retropharyngeal oedema. Treatment is supportive, with non-steroidal anti-inflammatory drugs.

== Additional images ==
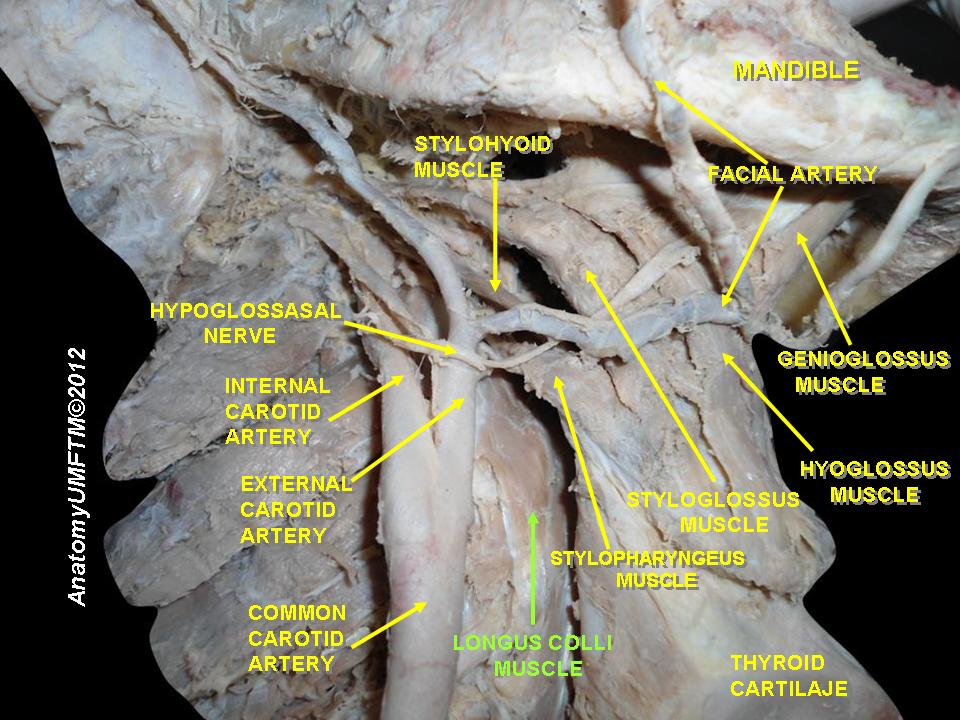
Longus colli muscle

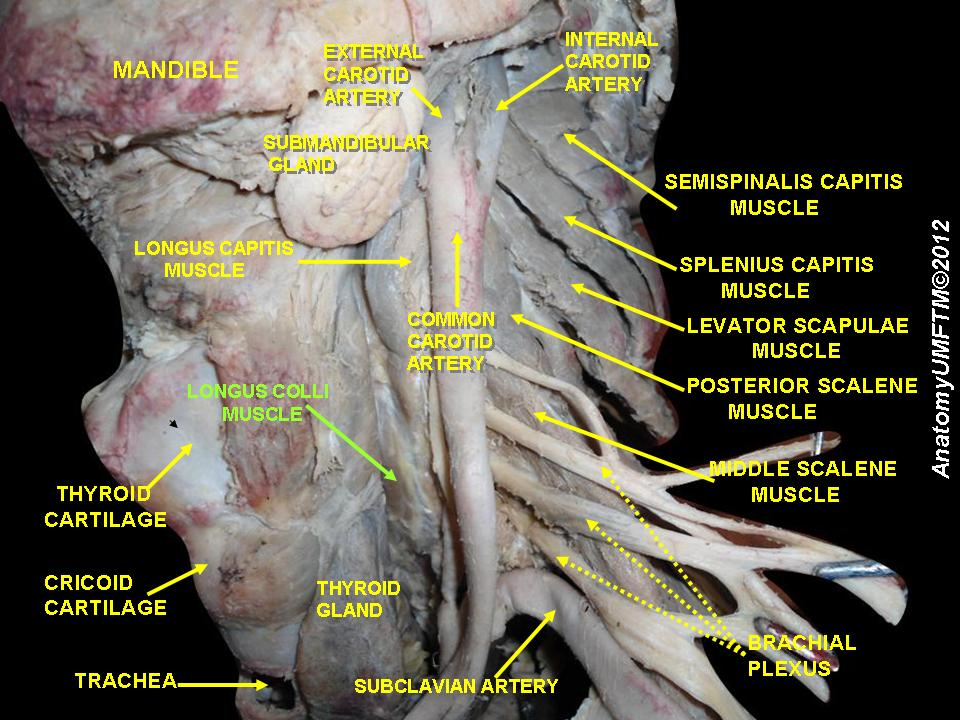
Longus colli muscle

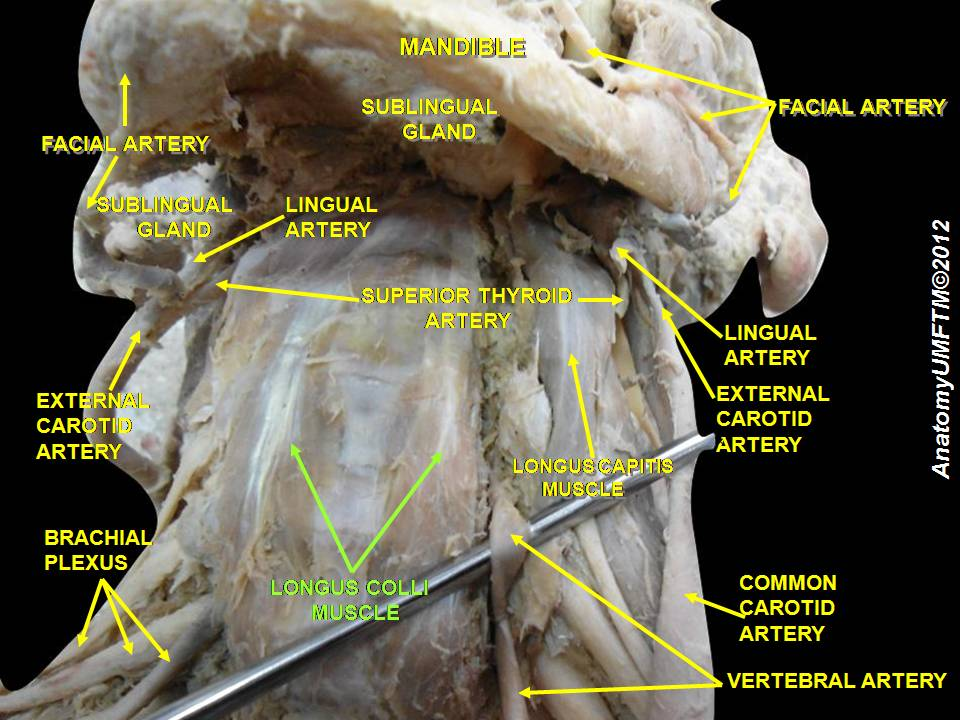
Longus colli muscle
