= Superior ganglion of glossopharyngeal nerve =

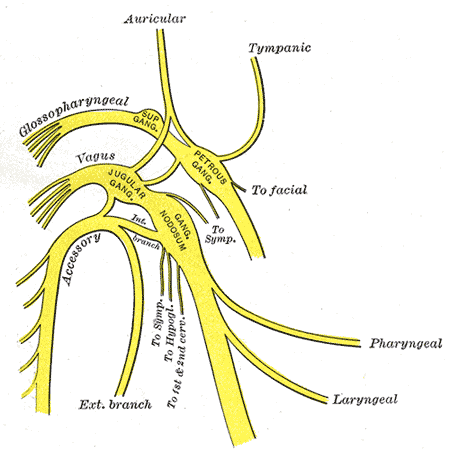
- Plan of upper portions of glossopharyngeal, vagus, and accessory nerves.

Details

Identifiers
- Latin: ganglion superius nervi glossopharyngei
- TA98: A14.2.01.136
- TA2: 6321
- FMA: 53474

The superior ganglion of the glossopharyngeal nerve is a sensory ganglion of the peripheral nervous system. It is located within the jugular foramen where the glossopharyngeal nerve exits the skull. It is smaller than and superior to the inferior ganglion of the glossopharyngeal nerve.

The neurons in the superior ganglion of the glossopharyngeal nerve provide sensory innervation to the middle ear and the internal surface of the tympanic membrane. The axons of these neurons branch from the glossopharyngeal nerve at the level of the inferior ganglion and form the tympanic nerve along with the preganglionic parasympathetic axons from the inferior salivatory nucleus. The tympanic nerve then travels through the inferior tympanic canaliculus to the tympanic cavity forming the tympanic plexus. From here, the sensory axons provide innervation of the middle ear and internal surface of the tympanic membrane. The parasympathetic axons branch from the tympanic plexus as the lesser petrosal nerve on their way to the otic ganglion.

The central processes of the neurons in the superior ganglion of the glossopharyngeal nerve synapse in the spinal trigeminal nucleus.
