= Glossopharyngeal ganglion =

Glossopharyngeal ganglion is a ganglion associated with cranial nerve IX. There are two types:

- Inferior ganglion of glossopharyngeal nerve
- Superior ganglion of glossopharyngeal nerve
