= Cranial nerve ganglia =

Identifiers
- TA98: A14.2.00.007
- TA2: 6166
- FMA: 54502

In neuroanatomy, the cranial nerve ganglia are ganglia of certain cranial nerves. They can be parasympathetic or sensory. All cranial nerve ganglia are bilateral.

== Parasympathetic ==
The four cranial parasympathetic ganglia are:

- ciliary ganglion
- pterygopalatine ganglion
- otic ganglion
- submandibular ganglion

== Sensory ==
- trigeminal ganglion (CN V)
- geniculate ganglion (CN VII)
- spiral ganglion (CN VIII)
- vestibular ganglion a.k.a. Scarpa's ganglion (CN VIII)
- superior ganglion of glossopharyngeal nerve
- inferior ganglion of glossopharyngeal nerve
- superior ganglion of vagus nerve
- inferior ganglion of vagus nerve
