= Salivatory nuclei =

Neural nuclei in the brainstem which control salivation

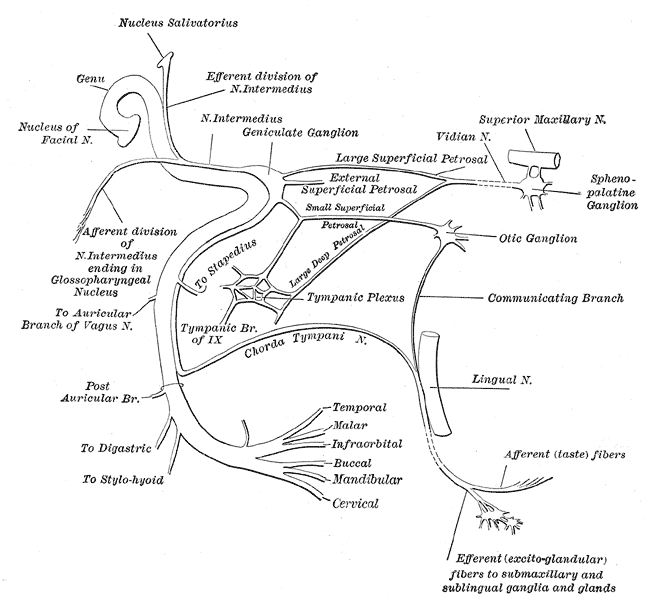
- Plan of the facial and intermediate nerves and their communication with other nerves. (Nucleus salivatorius visible at upper left.)

Details

Identifiers
- Latin: nucleī salivatorii
- NeuroNames: 590

The salivatory nuclei are two general visceral efferent nuclei located in the caudal pons, dorsal and lateral to the facial nucleus. Their neurons give rise to preganglionic parasympathetic nerve fibers in the control of salivation. The superior salivatory nucleus supplies fibers to the intermediate nerve (part of the facial nerve (CN VII). The inferior salivatory nucleus supplies fibers to the glossopharyngeal nerve (CN IX). The nuclei may also be involved in parasympathetic control of (extracranial and intracranial) head vasculature.

== Superior salivatory nucleus ==
The superior salivatory nucleus (or nucleus salivatorius superior) is a visceral motor cranial nerve nucleus of the facial nerve (CN VII). It is located in the pontine tegmentum. It projects pre-ganglionic visceral motor parasympathetic efferents (via CN VII) to the pterygopalatine ganglion, and submandibular ganglion.

The term "lacrimal nucleus" is sometimes used to refer to a portion of the superior salivatory nucleus.

=== Efferents ===
Preganglionic fibers en route to the pterygopalatine ganglion (destined to ultimately innervate the lacrimal gland and the mucosal glands of the nose, palate, and pharynx) subsequently form the greater petrosal nerve, whereas those en route to the submandibular ganglion (destined to ultimately innervate the submandibular and sublingual salivary glands) subsequently form the chorda tympani.

=== Afferents ===
The nucleus receives cortical stimuli from the nucleus of solitary tract via the dorsal longitudinal fasciculus and reflex connections.

== Inferior salivatory nucleus ==
The inferior salivatory nucleus (or nucleus salivatorius inferior) is a cluster of neurons in the medulla. It is the general visceral efferent (GVE) component of the glossopharyngeal nerve supplying the parasympathetic input to the parotid gland for salivation.

It lies immediately caudal to the superior salivatory nucleus and just above the upper end of the dorsal nucleus of the vagus nerve in the medulla.

The preganglionic parasympathetic fibres originate in the inferior salivatory nucleus of the glossopharyngeal nerve. They leave the glossopharyngeal nerve by its tympanic branch and then pass via the tympanic plexus and the lesser petrosal nerve to the otic ganglion. Here, the fibres synapse, and the postganglionic fibers pass by communicating branches to the auriculotemporal nerve, which conveys them to the parotid gland. They produce vasodilator and secretomotor effects.

=== Function ===
Parasympathetic input from fibers of the inferior salivatory nucleus stimulates the parotid gland to produce vasodilation and secrete saliva.

== Additional images ==
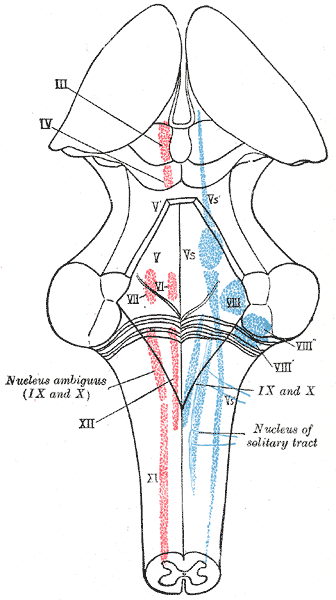
The cranial nerve nuclei schematically represented; dorsal view. Motor nuclei in red; sensory in blue.

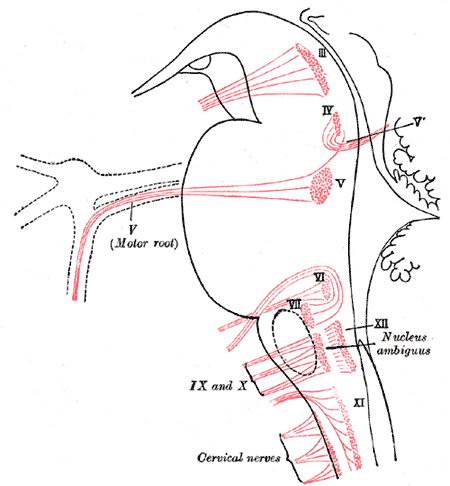
Nuclei of origin of cranial motor nerves schematically represented; lateral view.

== Bibliography ==
- Kiernan, John A. (2005). Barr's The Human Nervous System: An Anatomical Viewpoint. Lippincott Williams & Wilkins. p. 150. ISBN 0-7817-5154-3. Archived from the original on 2011-05-14.
