= Intraglandular deep parotid lymph nodes =

Lymph nodes

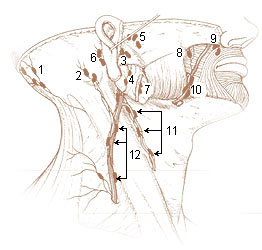
- 7. Intraglandular parotid

Details
- System: Lymphatic system

Identifiers
- Latin: nodi lymphoidei parotidei profundi intraglandulares

The Intraglandular deep parotid lymph nodes are a group of lymph nodes found inside the parotid gland.
