= Lingual branch =

Lingual branch can refer to:

- Lingual branches of glossopharyngeal nerve
- Lingual branches of hypoglossal nerve
