= Superior ganglion =

Superior ganglion can refer to:

- Superior ganglion of glossopharyngeal nerve
- Superior ganglion of vagus nerve
- Superior cervical ganglion
