= Tympanic nerve =

Branch of the glossopharyngeal nerve

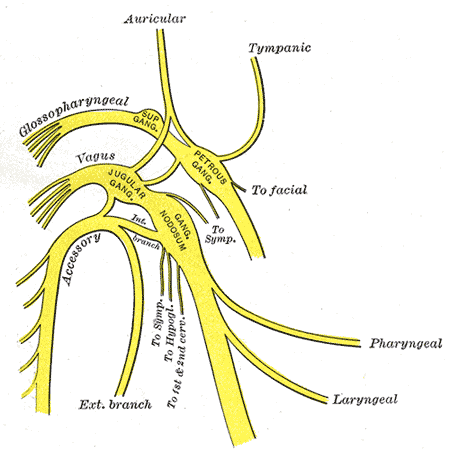
- Plan of upper portions of glossopharyngeal, vagus, and accessory nerves. (Tympanic nerve visible in upper right)

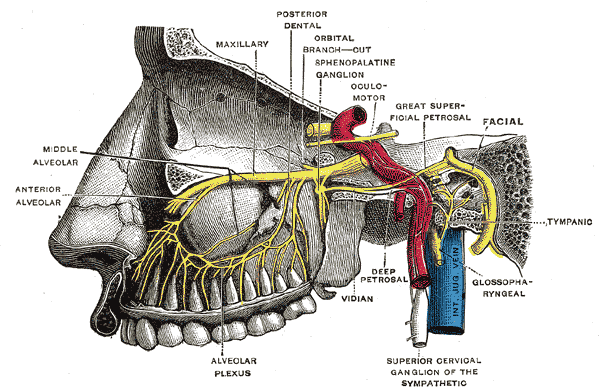
- Tympanic nerve (labelled right side)

Details
- To: Tympanic plexus

Identifiers
- Latin: nervus tympanicus
- TA98: A14.2.01.138
- TA2: 6323
- FMA: 53480

The tympanic nerve (Jacobson's nerve) is a branch of the glossopharyngeal nerve passing through the petrous part of the temporal bone to reach the middle ear. It provides sensory innervation for the middle ear, the Eustachian tube, the parotid gland, and mastoid cells. It also carries parasympathetic fibers destined for the parotid gland.

== Structure ==
The tympanic nerve contains sensory axons to the middle ear (including the internal surface of the tympanic membrane) whose cell bodies are lodged in the superior ganglion of the glossopharyngeal nerve.

It also contains parasympathetic axons which continue as the lesser petrosal nerve to the otic ganglion, which itself gives off postganglionic parasympathetic neurons.

=== Origin ===
The tympanic nerve arises from the inferior ganglion of the glossopharyngeal nerve (CN IX) in the jugular fossa.

=== Course ===
It passes through the petrous part of the temporal bone within the tympanic canaliculus that is situated within the bony ridge separating the carotid canal and the jugular foramen to reach the middle ear.

In the tympanic cavity of the middle ear, it ramifies upon the promontory of tympanic cavity to form the tympanic plexus.

=== Distribution ===
==== Sensory ====
The tympanic nerve provides sensation to the middle ear (tympanic cavity). This includes the internal surface of the tympanic membrane. It also supplies the Eustachian tube, the parotid gland, and mastoid air cells.

==== Parasympathetic autonomic ====
The tympanic nerve is also the parasympathetic root of the otic ganglion. These neurons then provide secretomotor innervation of the parotid gland via the auriculotemporal nerve. It is involved in the salivatory reflex to increase salivation during chewing.

=== Variation ===
The tympanic nerve usually arises from the inferior ganglion of the glossopharyngeal nerve. Rarely, it may arise from a higher part. Rarely, it may provide no parasympathetic fibres to the otic ganglion.

== Clinical significance ==
The tympanic nerve is involved in a reflex, where stimulation of the ear canal increases salivation.

=== Cancer ===
The tympanic nerve may be involved by paraganglioma, in this location referred to as a glomus tympanicum tumour. This causes a soft mass in the middle ear (tympanic cavity). There may also be pulsatile tinnitus, hearing loss or hearing problems, and some cardiac abnormalities.

== History ==
The tympanic nerve is also known as the nerve of Jacobson, or Jacobson's nerve.

== Additional images ==
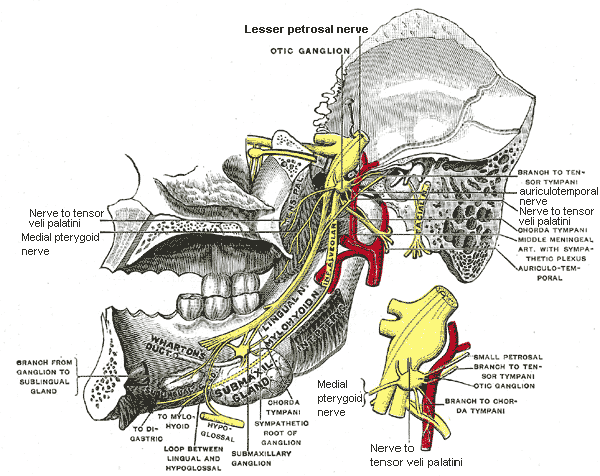
Lesser petrosal nerve

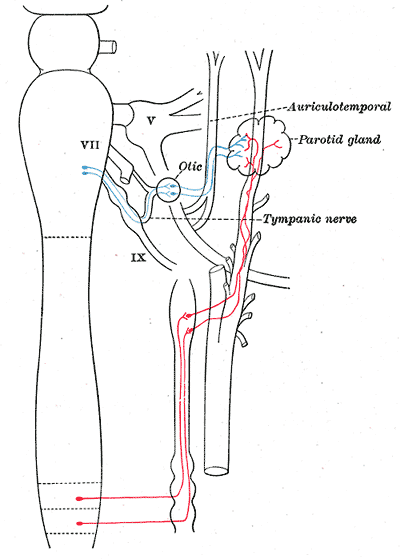
Sympathetic connections of the otic and superior cervical ganglia.
