= Hiatus for lesser petrosal nerve =

Opening in the temporal bone

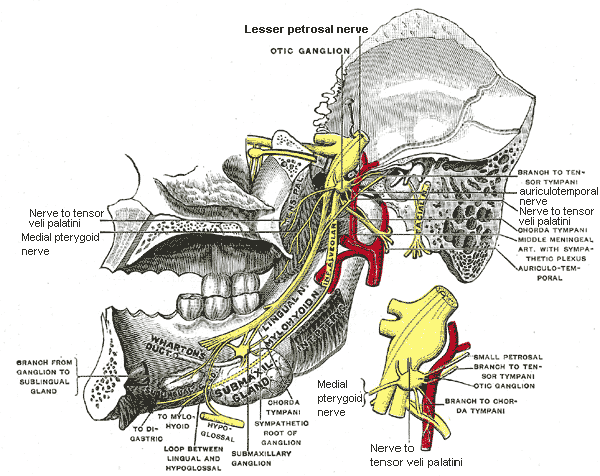
- Mandibular division of trifacial nerve, seen from the middle line. The small figure is an enlarged view of the otic ganglion.

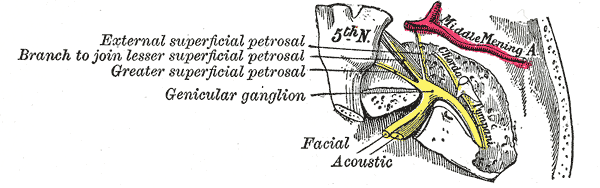
- The course and connections of the facial nerve in the temporal bone.

Details

Identifiers
- Latin: hiatus canalis nervi petrosi minoris
- TA98: A02.1.06.026
- TA2: 664
- FMA: 56448

The hiatus for lesser petrosal nerve is a hiatus in the petrous part of the temporal bone which transmits the lesser petrosal nerve. It is located posterior to the groove for the superior petrosal sinus and posterolateral to the jugular foramen.

The hiatus for lesser petrosal nerve receives the lesser petrosal nerve as it branches from the glossopharyngeal nerve (CN IX) before the glossopharyngeal enters the posterior cranial fossa through the jugular foramen. The lesser petrosal nerve then travels anteriorly from the hiatus toward the foramen ovale, through which it exits the cranial cavity.
