= Hiatus for petrosal nerve =

Hiatus for petrosal nerve can refer to:

- Hiatus for greater petrosal nerve or hiatus of the facial canal (hiatus canalis nervi petrosi majoris or hiatus canalis facialis)
- Hiatus for lesser petrosal nerve (hiatus canalis nervi petrosi minoris)
