= Gustatory nucleus =

Rostral part of the solitary nucleus located in the medulla

Details
- Parts: A component of the solitary nucleus
- Function: Assisting in food identification.

Identifiers
- NeuroNames: 1386

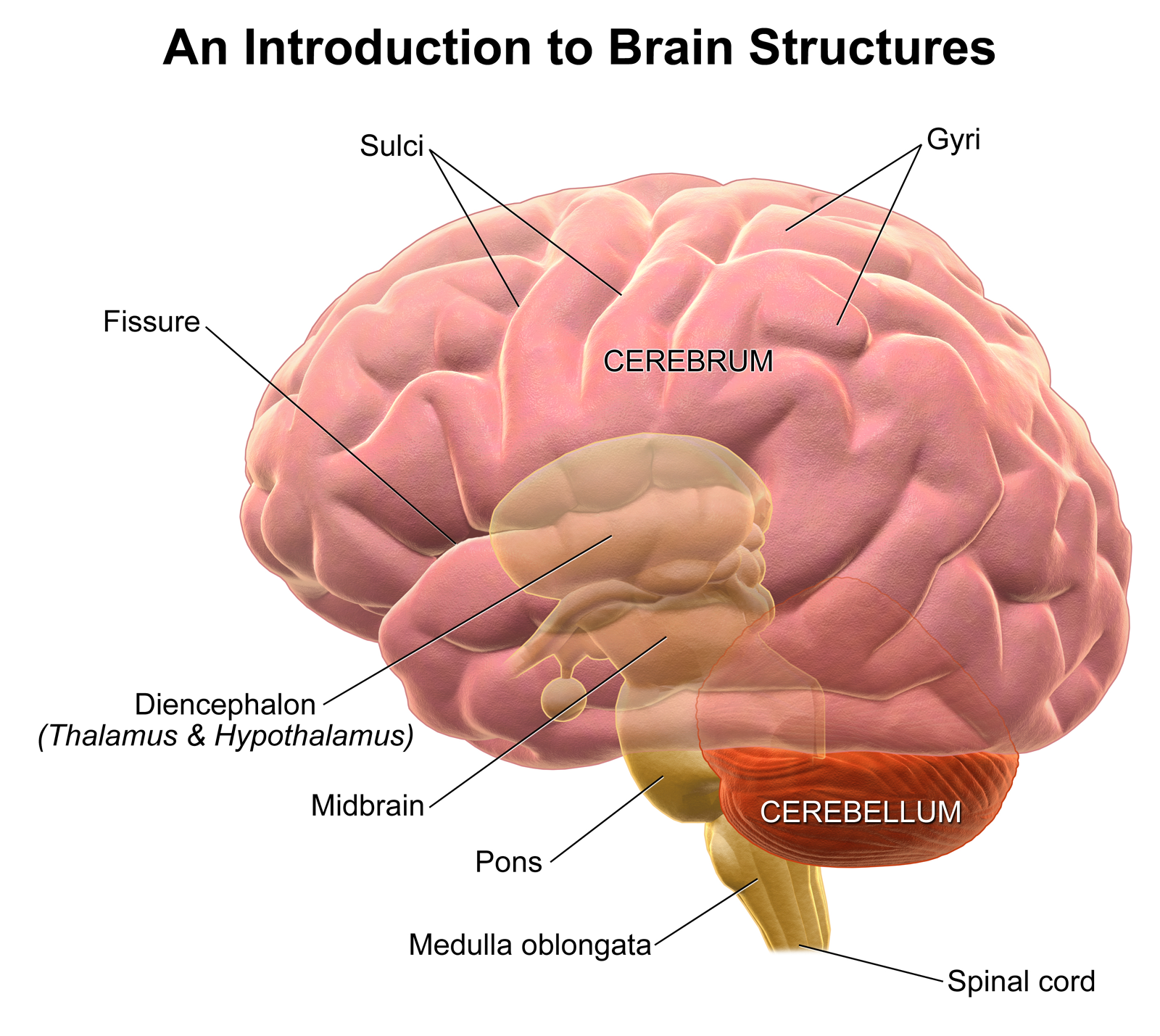
Location of structures connected to the gustatory nucleus

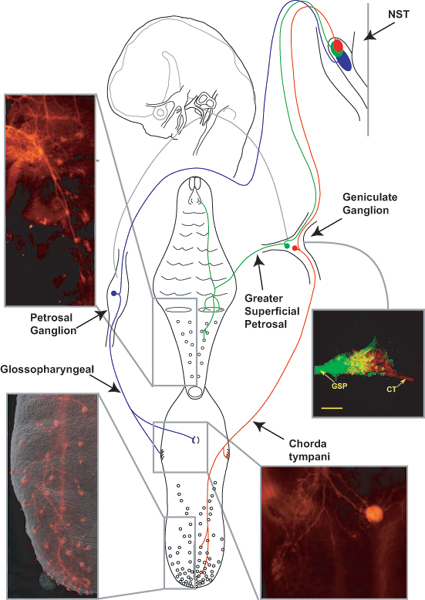
Basic neuroanatomy of the gustatory system.

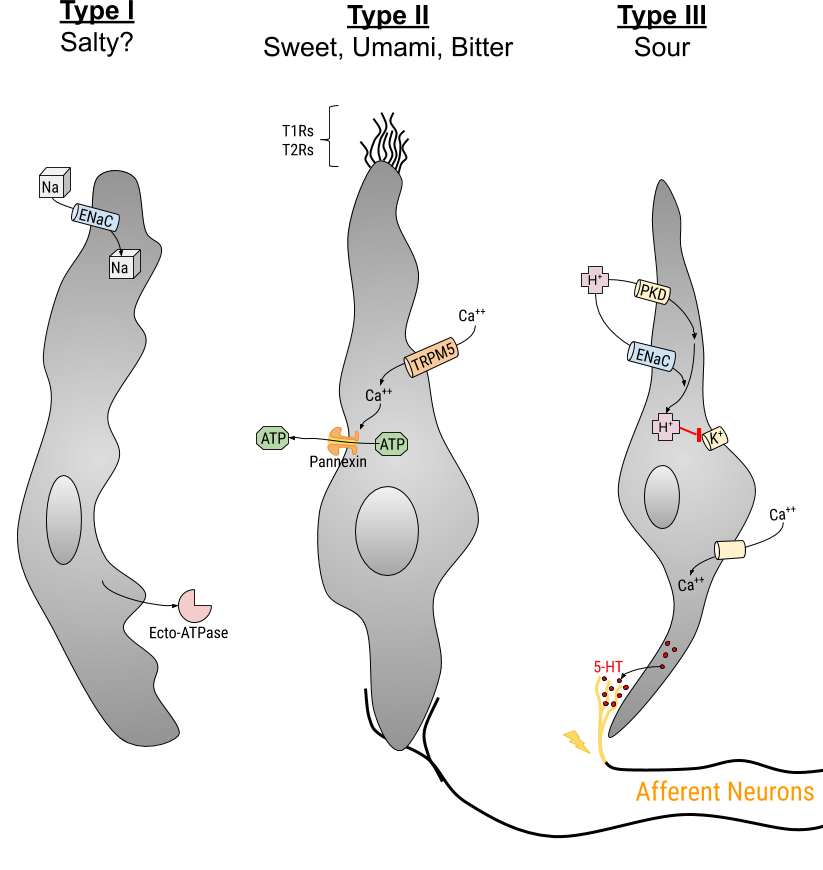
Different taste receptors in the tongue and their connections to afferent neurons.

The gustatory nucleus is the rostral part of the solitary nucleus located in the medulla oblongata. The gustatory nucleus is associated with the sense of taste and has two sections, the rostral and lateral regions. A close association between the gustatory nucleus and visceral information exists for this function in the gustatory system, assisting in homeostasis - via the identification of food that might be possibly poisonous or harmful for the body. There are many gustatory nuclei in the brain stem. Each of these nuclei corresponds to three cranial nerves, the facial nerve (VII), the glossopharyngeal nerve (IX), and the vagus nerve (X) and GABA is the primary inhibitory neurotransmitter involved in its functionality. All visceral afferents in the vagus and glossopharyngeal nerves first arrive in the nucleus of the solitary tract and information from the gustatory system can then be relayed to the thalamus and cortex.

The central axons on primary sensory neurons in the taste system in the cranial nerve ganglia connect to lateral and rostral regions of the nucleus of the solitary tract which is located in the medulla and is also known as the gustatory nucleus. The most pronounced gustatory nucleus is the rostral cap of the nucleus solitarius which is located at the ponto-medullary junction. Afferent taste fibers from the facial and from the facial and glossopharyngeal nerves are sent to the nucleus solitarius. The gustatory system then sends information to the thalamus which ultimately sends information to the cerebral cortex.

Each nucleus from the gustatory system can contain networks of interconnected neurons that can help regulate the firing rates of one another. Fishes (specifically channel catfish), have been used to study the structure, mechanism for activation and its integrated with the solitary nucleus. The secondary gustatory nucleus contains three subnucleic structures: a medial, central and dorsal subnucleus (with the central and dorsal positioned in the rostral area of the secondary gustatory nucleus).

Furthermore, the gustatory nucleus is connected via the pons to the thalamocortical system consisting of the hypothalamus and the amygdala. These connections can stimulate appetite, satisfaction, and other homeostatic responses that have to do with eating. Distributed throughout the dorsal epithelium of the tongue, soft palate, pharynx, and upper part of the esophagus are taste buds that contain taste cells, which are peripheral receptors involved in gustatory system and react to chemical stimuli. Different sections of the tongue are innervated with the three cranial nerves. The facial nerve (VII) innervates the anterior two-thirds of the tongue, the glossopharyngeal nerve (IX) innervates the posterior one-third and the vagus nerve (X) innervates the epiglottis.

The study of the nucleus usually involves model organisms like fish, hamsters, and mice. Studies with humans involve MRIs and PET scan. A study done on monkeys found that when a given food is consumed to the point that a monkey is full and satisfied, specific orbitofrontal neurons in the monkey direct their firing towards that stimulus which indicates that these neurons are used in motivating one to eat as well as not to eat. In addition, the gustatory system has been greatly studied in some cyprinoid and cobitoid fish species because of their enormously hypertrophied peripheral gustatory nerves. The major difference between the gustatory neural structure of the fish and the rat is that the secondary gustatory nucleus of the fish projects to the interior lobe's lateral lobule of the diencephalon, while in the rat, the secondary gustatory nucleus projects to a specific thalamic area in the ventrobasal complex and to the ventral forebrain and rostroventral diencephalon.

== Mechanism ==
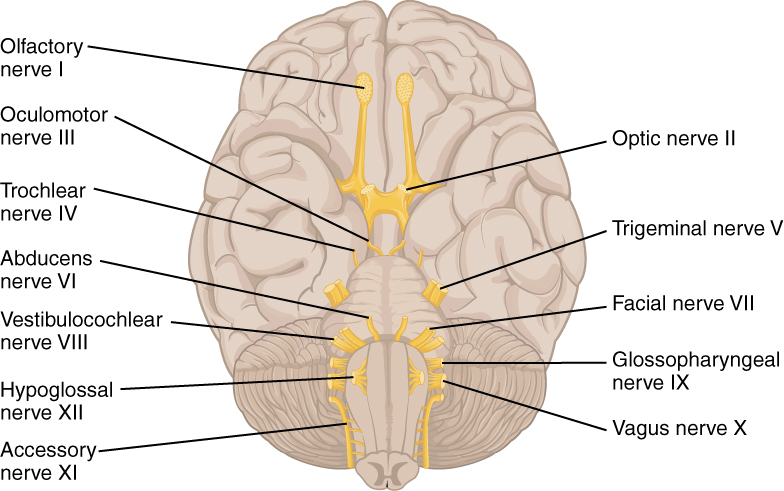
Three of the twelve cranial nerves send input to the Gustatory nucleus: the facial nerve (VII), the glossopharyngeal nerve (IX), and the vagus nerve (X).

Taste cells synapse with primary sensory axons of three cranial nerves; the facial nerve, glossopharyngeal nerve, and the vagus nerve. These cranial nerves innervate the taste buds in the tongue, palate, epiglottis, and esophagus. The primary sensory neurons of these central axons are in the cranial nerve ganglia of each respective cranial nerve. To produce the sense of taste, these neurons project to the gustatory nucleus, or the rostral and lateral regions of the nucleus of the solitary tract, and are ultimately projected to the cerebral cortex.

The tongue contains taste receptors, that sends sensory information via action potential to the solitary nucleus. Then, such signal is directed towards the gustatory nucleus, which is located within the Thalamus. Topography on the tongue doesn't determine the arrangement and processing of input within this nucleus. Instead, individual gustatory nuclei processing information is influenced by separate taste bud populations. Some examples of gustatory cranial nerves, that innervate the taste buds and are connected to this nucleus include the chorda tympani and lingual branch of the glossopharyngeal nerves.

Tastants are the chemical molecules that provide the stimulus for taste perception. The concentration of this taste stimulus is what dictates the intensity of the taste sensation that is perceived. Furthermore, the threshold concentration for a required degree of sensation varies depending on the specific tastant. However, in general, threshold concentrations for tastants are very high relative to other sensory stimuli such as odorants.

== Gustatory nucleus and obesity ==
Numerous studies have investigated the connection between the gustatory nucleus and obesity; an increase in visceral fat is negatively correlated with taste function. In both humans and rats, taste sensitivity changes with body weight, especially sweet and fat taste qualities that signal high energy availability. The nucleus tractus solitarii (NTS), which includes the gustatory nucleus, has neurons that express many different receptors that inform organisms of their internal state and are involved in the homeostatic regulation of ingestion. This shows the role of taste as a sensory regulator of food consumption that produces different responses depending on the chemical composition of a food. However, in rats and humans with obesity, there is a reduction in taste receptor cell expression as well as reduced activation of taste receptor cells.

In one study, the effect of obesity on responses to taste stimuli in the NTS was investigated by recording taste responses from single cells in this sensory region of rats with diet induced obesity due to a high energy diet and lean rats fed a normal diet. Results of the study showed that rats with diet induced obesity produce a more prevalent response to taste in the gustatory nucleus of the NTS as well as a weakened association between taste responses and ingestive behavior compared to lean rats. In addition, it was also discovered that the responses to taste stimuli in rats with obesity were smaller, shorter, and occur at longer latencies compared to those of lean rats. These electrophysiological recordings create a connection between the gustatory nucleus and obesity as exposure to a high energy diet can alter how taste is encoded by the nervous system. In both humans and rats with obesity, taste responses are shorter and weaker and can have a large impact on how the brainstem represents taste stimuli. This ultimately effects food choice and body weight, resulting in a possible increase in consumption of high energy foods, such as sugars and fats.
