= Lingual branches of glossopharyngeal nerve =

Nerves of the tongue

Details
- From: glossopharyngeal nerve

Identifiers
- Latin: rami linguales nervi glossopharyngei
- TA98: A14.2.01.148
- TA2: 6331
- FMA: 53490

The lingual branch of the glossopharyngeal nerve innervates the taste buds of the posterior 1/3 of the tongue and provides general sensation to this same area. The neuron cell bodies whose axons form the nerve, are found in the inferior ganglion of the glossopharyngeal nerve.
