= Parotid gland =

Major salivary gland in many animals

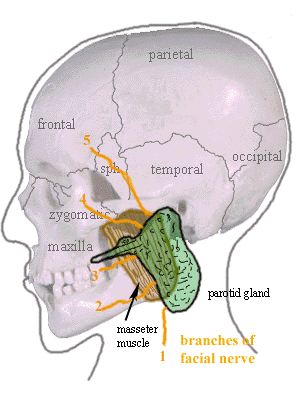
- Location of the left parotid gland in humans (shown in green).

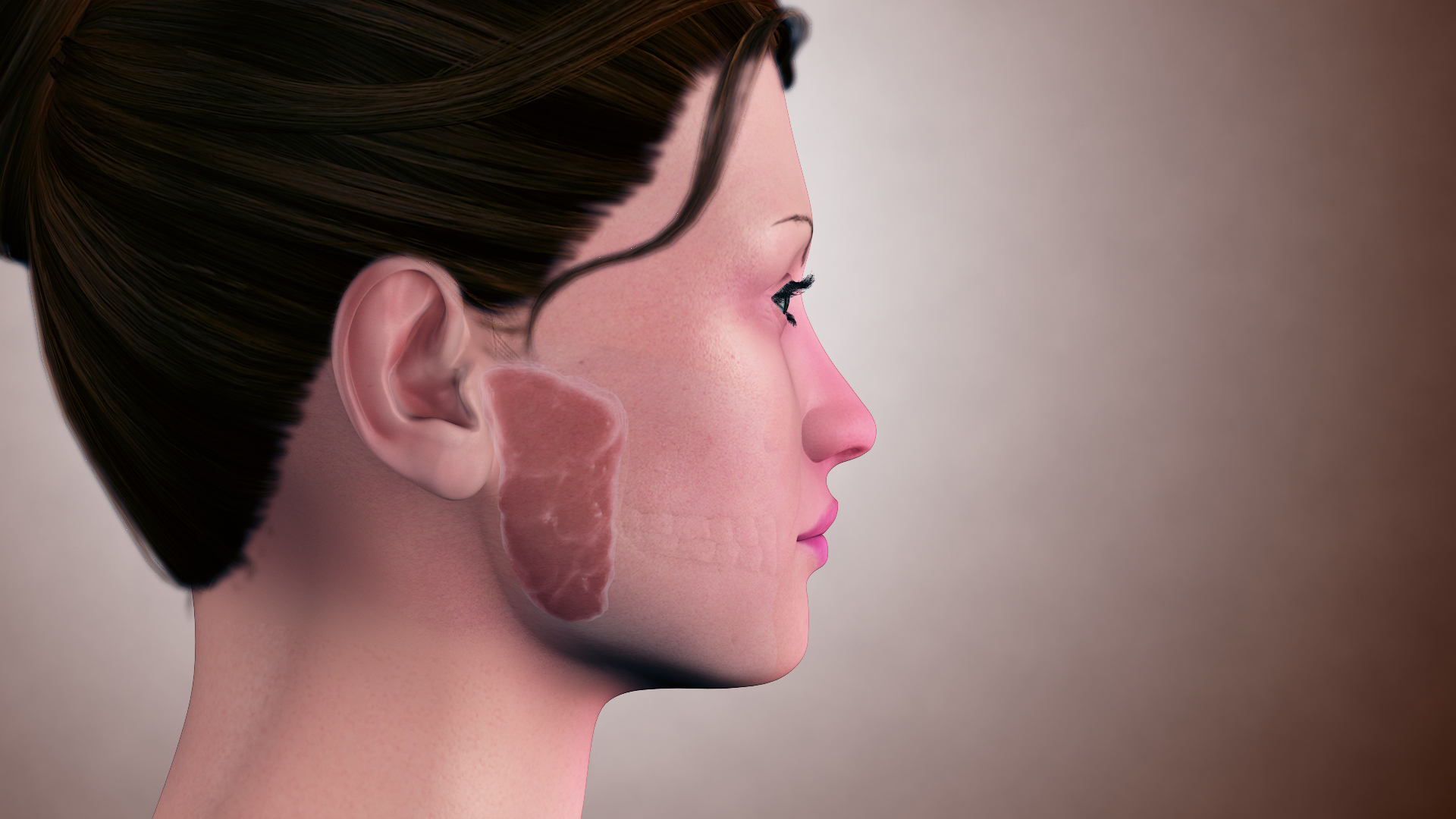
- Image

Details
- Part of: Salivary glands
- System: Digestive system

Identifiers
- Latin: glandula parotidea
- MeSH: D010306
- TA98: A05.1.02.003
- TA2: 2800
- FMA: 59790

The parotid gland is a major salivary gland in many animals. In humans, the two parotid glands are present on either side of the mouth and in front of both ears. They are the largest of the salivary glands. Each parotid is wrapped around the mandibular ramus, and secretes serous saliva through the parotid duct into the mouth, to facilitate mastication and swallowing and to begin the digestion of starches. There are also two other types of salivary glands; they are submandibular and sublingual glands. Sometimes accessory parotid glands are found close to the main parotid glands.

The venom glands of snakes are a modification of the parotid salivary glands.

== Etymology ==
The word parotid literally means "beside the ear". From Greek παρωτίς (stem παρωτιδ-) : (gland) behind the ear < παρά - pará : in front, and οὖς - ous (stem ὠτ-, ōt-) : ear.

== Structure ==
The parotid glands are a pair of mainly serous salivary glands located below and in front of each ear canal, draining their secretions into the vestibule of the mouth through the parotid duct. Each gland lies behind the mandibular ramus and in front of the mastoid process of the temporal bone. The gland can be felt on either side, by feeling in front of each ear, along the cheek, and below the angle of the mandible.

The parotid duct, a long excretory duct, emerges from the front of each gland, superficial to the masseter muscle. The duct pierces the buccinator muscle, then opens into the mouth on the inner surface of the cheek, usually opposite the maxillary second molar. The parotid papilla is a small elevation of tissue that marks the opening of the parotid duct on the inner surface of the cheek.

The gland has four surfaces – superficial or lateral, superior, anteromedial, and posteromedial. The gland has three borders – anterior, medial, and posterior. The parotid gland has two ends – a superior end in the form of a small superior surface and an inferior end (apex).

A number of different structures pass through the gland. From lateral to medial, these are:

1. Facial nerve
2. Retromandibular vein
3. External carotid artery
4. Superficial temporal artery
5. Branches of the great auricular nerve
6. Maxillary artery

Sometimes accessory parotid glands are found as an anatomic variation. These are close to the main glands and consist of ectopic salivary gland tissue.

Capsule of parotid gland

A capsule of the parotid gland is formed from the investing layer of the deep cervical fascia. It is supplied by the great auricular nerve. The fascia splits to enclose the gland. This splitting occurs between the angle of the mandible and the mastoid process. The superficial lamina (parotidomassetric fascia) is thick and is attached to the zygomatic arch. The deep lamina is thin and is attached to the styloid process, tympanic plate, and the ramus of the mandible. The part of the deep lamina extending between the styloid process and the mandible is thickened to form a stylomastoid ligament. The stylomandibular ligament separates the parotid gland from the superficial lobe of the submandibular gland.

=== Relations ===
- Superficial or lateral relations: The gland is situated deep to the skin, superficial fascia, superficial lamina of investing layer of deep cervical fascia, and great auricular nerve (anterior ramus of C2 and C3).
- Anteromedial relations: The gland is situated posterolaterally to the mandibular ramus, masseter, and medial pterygoid muscles. A part of the gland may extend between the ramus and medial pterygoid, as the pterygoid process. Branches of the facial nerve and parotid duct emerge through this surface.
- Posteromedial relations: The gland is situated anterolaterally to mastoid process of temporal bone with its attached sternocleidomastoid and digastric muscles, styloid process of temporal bone with its three attached muscles (stylohyoid, stylopharyngeus, and styloglossus) and carotid sheath with its contained neurovasculature (internal carotid artery, internal jugular vein, and 9th, 10th, 11th, and 12th cranial nerves).
- Medial relations: The parotid gland comes into contact with the superior pharyngeal constrictor muscle at the medial border, where the anteromedial and posteromedial surfaces meet. Hence, a need exists to examine the fauces in parotitis.

The facial nerve (CN VII) splits into its branches within the parotid gland, thus forming its parotid plexus. Nerves of this plexus then pass through the parotid gland without innervating the gland itself.

=== Vasculature ===
Arterial supply

The external carotid artery and its terminal branches within the gland, namely, the superficial temporal and the maxillary artery, also the posterior auricular artery supply the parotid gland.

Venous drainage

Venous return is to the retromandibular veins.

Lymphatic drainage

The gland is mainly drained into the preauricular or parotid lymph nodes which ultimately drain to the deep cervical chain.

=== Nerve supply ===
The parotid gland receives both sensory and autonomic innervation.

Sympathetic

The cell bodies of the preganglionic sympathetic fibres that supply the gland usually lie in the lateral horns of upper thoracic spinal segments (T1-T3). Postganglionic sympathetic fibers from superior cervical ganglion reach the gland by passing along the external carotid artery and middle meningeal artery. They act to cause vasoconstriction.

Parasympathetic

Preganglionic parasympathetic fibers for the parotid gland arise in the brainstem in the inferior salivatory nucleus, and leave the brain in the glossopharyngeal nerve (CN IX), then pass in the tympanic nerve to the tympanic plexus, then from the tympanic plexus in the lesser petrosal nerve to the otic ganglion where they synapse. Postganglionic (post-synaptic) fibers from the ganglion then "hitch-hike" along the auriculotemporal nerve to reach the parotid gland.

Sensory

General sensory innervation to the parotid gland and its capsule is provided by the auriculotemporal nerve.

=== Histology ===
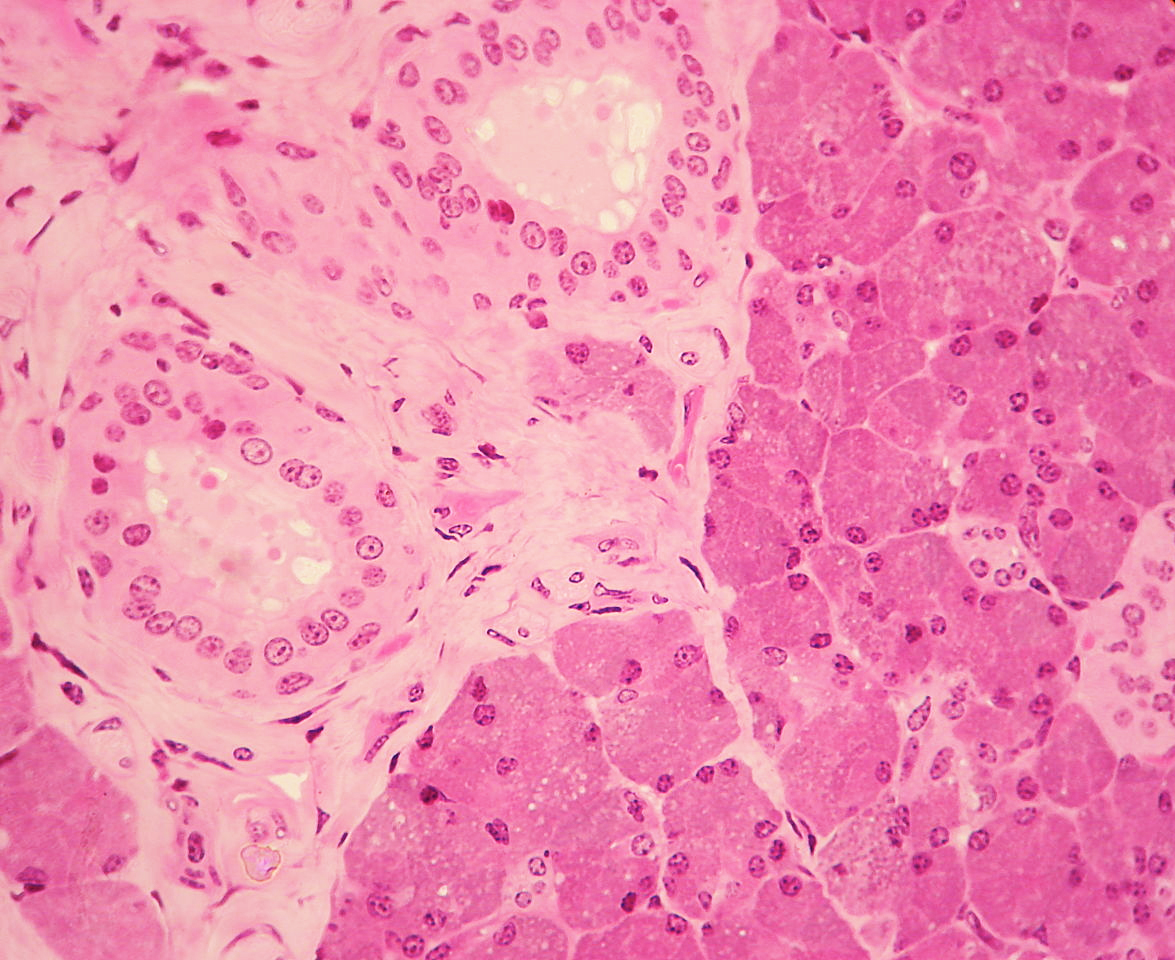
The parotid gland

The gland has a capsule of its own of dense connective tissue but is also provided with a false capsule by the investing layer of the deep cervical fascia. The fascia at the imaginary line between the angle of the mandible and the mastoid process splits into a superficial and a deep lamina to enclose the gland. The risorius is a small muscle embedded with this capsule substance.

The gland has short, striated ducts and long, intercalated ducts. The intercalated ducts also numerous and lined with cuboidal epithelial cells and have lumina larger than those of the acini, and several of these ducts they join to form striated ducts. These are also numerous and consist of simple columnar epithelium, having striations that represent the infolded basal cell membranes and mitochondria, and multiple striated ducts converge and drain into larger interlobular excretory ducts, which finally join to form the parotid duct.

Though the parotid gland is the largest, it provides only 25% of the total salivary volume. The serous cell predominates in the parotid, making the gland secrete a mainly serous secretory product.

The parotid gland also secretes salivary alpha-amylase (sAA), which is the first step in the decomposition of starches during mastication. It is the main exocrine gland to secrete this. It breaks down amylose (straight chain starch) and amylopectin (branched starch) by hydrolyzing alpha 1,4 bonds. Additionally, the alpha amylase has been suggested to prevent bacterial attachment to oral surfaces and to enable bacterial clearance from the mouth.

=== Development ===
The parotid salivary glands appear early in the sixth week of the prenatal development and are the first major salivary glands formed. The epithelial buds of these glands are located on the inner part of the cheek, near the labial commissures of the primitive mouth (from ectodermal lining near angles of the stomodeum in the 1st/2nd pharyngeal arches; the stomodeum itself is created from the rupturing of the oropharyngeal membrane at about 26 days.) These buds grow up posteriorly toward the otic placodes of the ears and branch to form solid cords with rounded terminal ends near the developing facial nerve. Later, at around 10 weeks of prenatal development, these cords are canalized and form ducts, with the largest becoming the parotid duct for the parotid gland. The rounded terminal ends of the cords form the acini of the glands. Secretion by the parotid glands via the parotid duct begins at about 18 weeks of gestation. Again, the supporting connective tissue of the gland develops from the surrounding mesenchyme.

== Clinical significance ==
=== Parotitis ===
Inflammation of one or both parotid glands is known as parotitis. The most common cause of parotitis is mumps. Widespread vaccination against mumps has markedly reduced the incidence of mumps parotitis. The pain of mumps is due to the swelling of the gland within its fibrous capsule.

Apart from viral infection, other infections, such as bacterial, can cause parotitis (acute suppurative parotitis or chronic parotitis). These infections may cause blockage of the duct by salivary duct calculi or external compression. Parotid gland swellings can also be due to benign lymphoepithelial lesions caused by Mikulicz disease and Sjögren's disease. Swelling of the parotid gland may also indicate the eating disorder bulimia nervosa, creating the look of a heavy jaw line. With the inflammation of mumps or obstruction of the ducts, increased levels of the salivary alpha amylase secreted by the parotid gland can be detected in the blood stream.

==== Mumps ====
Mumps is seen to be a common cause of parotid gland swelling – 85% of cases occur in children younger than 15 years. The disease is highly contagious and spreads by airborne droplets from salivary, nasal, and urinary secretions. Symptoms include oedema in the area, trismus as well as otalgia. The lesion tends to begin on one side of the face and eventually becomes bilateral. The transmission of the paramyxovirus is by contact with the infected persons saliva. Initial symptoms tend to be a headache and fever. Mumps is not fatal, however further complications can include swelling of the ovaries or the testes. Diagnosis of mumps is confirmed through viral serology, management of the condition includes hydration and good oral hygiene of the patient requiring excellent motivation. However, since the development of the mumps vaccine, given at the age of between 4–6 years, the incidence of this viral infection has greatly reduced. This vaccine has reduced the incidence by 99%.

=== Fibrous reactions ===
Tuberculosis and syphilis can cause granuloma formation in the parotid glands.

=== Salivary stones ===
Salivary stones mainly occur within the main confluence of the ducts and within the main parotid duct. The patient usually complains of intense pain when salivating and tends to avoid foods which produce this symptom. In addition, the parotid gland may become enlarged upon trying to eat. The pain can be reproduced in clinic by squirting lemon juice into the mouth. Surgery depends upon the site of the stone: if within the anterior aspect of the duct, a simple incision into the buccal mucosa with sphinterotomy may allow removal; however, if situated more posteriorly within the main duct, complete gland excision may be necessary.

=== Injury ===
The parotid salivary gland can also be pierced and the facial nerve temporarily traumatized when an inferior alveolar local anesthesia nerve block is incorrectly administered, causing transient facial paralysis.

=== Cancer and tumours ===
About 80% of tumors of the parotid gland are benign. The most common of these include pleomorphic adenoma (70% of tumors, of which 60% occur in females) and Warthin tumor (i.e. adenolymphoma, which is more common in males than in females). Their importance is in relation to their anatomical position and tendency to grow over time. The tumorous growth can also change the consistency of the gland and cause facial pain on the involved side.

Around 20% of parotid tumors are malignant, with the most common tumors being mucoepidermoid carcinoma and adenoid cystic carcinoma. Other malignant tumors of the parotid gland include acinic cell carcinoma, carcinoma expleomorphic adenoma, adenocarcinoma (arising from ductal epithelium of parotid gland), squamous cell carcinoma (arising from parenchyma of parotid gland), and undifferentiated carcinoma. Metastasis from other sites like phyllodes tumour of breast presenting as parotid swelling have also been described. Critically, the relationship of the tumor to the branches of the facial nerve (CN VII) must be defined because resection may damage the nerves, resulting in paralysis of the muscles of facial expression.

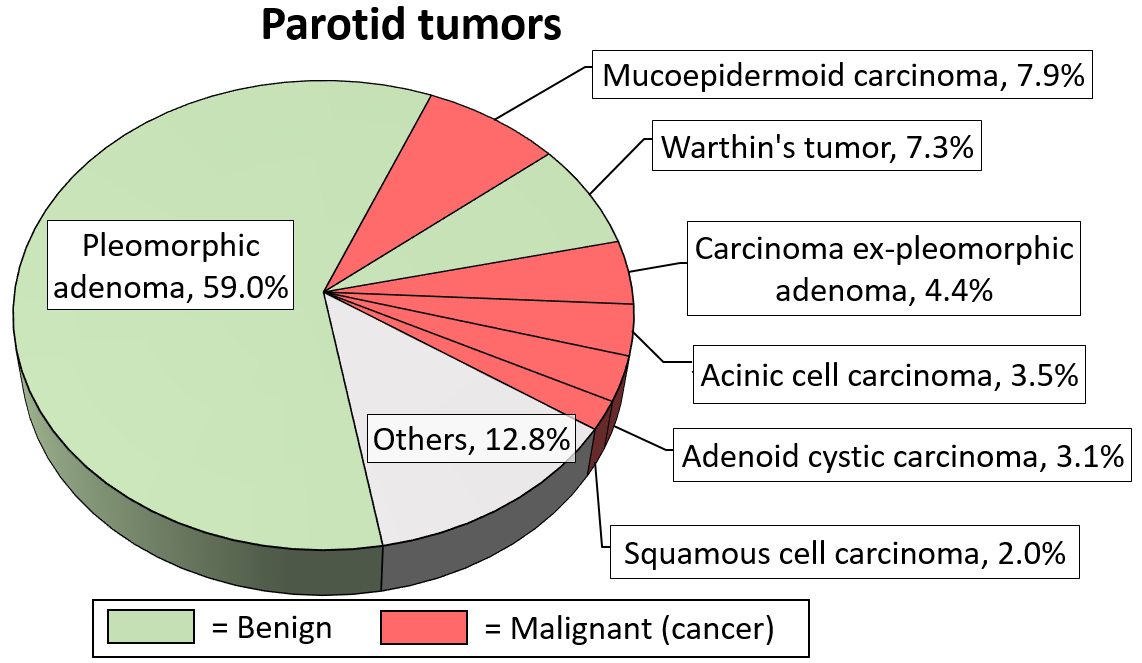
Relative incidence of parotid tumors.

==== Benign ====
Neoplastic lesions of the parotid salivary gland can either be benign or malignant. Within the parotid gland, nearly 80% of tumours are benign. Benign lesions tend to be painless, asymptomatic and slow-growing. The most common salivary gland neoplasms in children are hemangiomas, lymphatic malformations, and pleomorphic adenomas. Diagnosis of benign lesions require a fine-needle-like aspiration biopsy. With various benign lesions, most commonly the pleomorphic adenoma, there is a risk of developing malignancy over time. As a result, these lesions are typically resected.

Benign lesions of the parotid gland have a significantly higher incidence than malignant lesions.

==== Malignant ====
Malignant salivary gland lesions are rare. However, when a tumour extends to the submandibular, sublingual and the minor salivary glands, they tend to be malignant. Distinguishing a malignant lesion from a benign one may be difficult as they both present as painless lesions. A biopsy is crucial in aiding diagnosis. There are common signs that can highlight the presence of a malignant lesion. These include facial nerve weakness, rapid increase of the size of the lump as well as ulceration of the mucosa of the skin.

Mucoepidermoid carcinoma is a common malignant tumour of the salivary glands and has a low incidence of 4–13%. Adenoid cystic carcinoma is also a common malignant salivary gland lesion and has an incidence of 4–8%. This carcinoma tends to invade nerves and can reoccur post-treatment.

=== Polycystic parotid disease ===
A developmental polycystic disease of the salivary gland is seen to be extremely rare and is seen to be independent of recurrent parotitis. The cause is thought to be a defect in the interactions between activin, follistatin and TGF-β, leading to a developmental disorder of glandular tissue.

=== Surgery ===
Surgical treatment of parotid gland tumors is sometimes difficult because of the anatomical relations of the facial nerve parotid lodge, as well as the increased potential for postoperative relapse. Thus, detection of early stages of a parotid tumor is extremely important in terms of postoperative prognosis. Operative technique is laborious, because of relapses and incomplete previous treatment made in other border specialties. Surgical techniques in parotid surgery have evolved in the last years with the use of neuromonitoring of the facial nerve and have become safer and less invasive.

After surgical removal of the parotid gland (parotidectomy), the auriculotemporal nerve is liable to damage and upon recovery it fuses with sweat glands. This can cause sweating on the cheek on the side of the face of the affected gland. This condition is known as Frey's syndrome.

== Infections ==
=== Bacterial infections ===
==== Acute bacterial parotitis ====
Commonly caused by a retrograde bacterial infection as a result of illness, sepsis, trauma, surgery, reduced salivary flow due to medications, diabetes, malnutrition and dehydration. Classically symptoms of painful swelling in the parotid region when eating seen. Management is based upon antibacterials, rehydration combined with gentle massage to encourage salivary flow.

==== Chronic bacterial parotitis ====
A latent infection despite clinical resolution of the disease resulting in impaired function. Histologically glandular duct dilation, abscess formation and atrophy may be seen. Parotid secretions are viscous. Disease course shows pain and swelling, waxing and waning. Radiographic screening should be undertaken to rule out sialolith. Management with palliative care with parotidectomy as a last resort.

=== Viral infections ===
==== Mumps ====
Acute non-suppurative disease that often occurs in epidemics. Prevented by MMR vaccine. Caused by paramyxovirus that is transmitted by infected saliva and urine. A prodromal period of 24–28 hours is experienced, followed by rapid and painful swelling of the parotid gland. Treatment is supportive (bedrest, hydration) as spontaneous resolution occurs within 5–10 days.

==== HIV / AIDS ====
Diffuse gland enlargement is seen, and may affect patients throughout all stages of the infection. Lymphoepithelial cysts seen via imaging help aid diagnosis. Pathogenic process occurs due to circulating CD8 lymphocytes within the salivary gland. Medical management via use of antiretrovirals, excellent oral hygiene measures and sialogogues.

=== Autoimmune related ===
==== Systemic lupus erythematosus ====
Most commonly seen in fourth and fifth decades in females, and can affect any salivary gland. Presentation is a slowly enlarging gland, with diagnosis made by identification of the underlying systemic disorder and measurements of salivary chemical levels. Sodium and chloride ion levels will be elevated two or three times normal levels. Treatment is by addressing the underlying systemic condition.

==== Sarcoidosis ====
Sarcoidosis is a chronic systemic disease characterised by the production of non-caseating granulomas of unknown aetiology. It can affect any organ of the body, depressing cellular immunity and enhancing humoral immunity.

Salivary gland involvement primarily involves both parotid glands, causing enlargement and swelling. Salivary gland biopsy with histopathologic examination is needed to make the distinction between whether Sjoren's syndrome or sarcoidosis is the cause of this.

==== Sjogren's syndrome ====
Salivary gland enlargement occurs in up to 30% of patients with Sjogren's syndrome, with the parotid gland being most often enlarged, and bilateral parotid gland enlargement seen in 25–60% of patients. However, the parotid glands have a longer-lasting secretory capacity in Sjogren's syndrome patient and therefore are the last glands to manifest hyposalivation in the disease. Histopathology shows clustering of lymphocytic infiltrates and epimyoepithelial islands.

=== Mycobacterial infection ===
The most common head and neck manifestation of tuberculosis mycobacterial disease is infection of cervical lymph nodes. The infection is thought to originate in the tonsils or gingiva, ascending to the parotid gland. Two clinical forms; acute and chronic lesions. Acute lesions have diffuse glandular edema, easily confused with acute sialdentitis or abscess. The chronic lesions occur as slow growing masses mimicking tumors.

== Examination of the salivary gland ==
=== History and examination ===
A patient with parotid swelling may complain of swelling, pain, xerostomia, bad taste and sometimes sialorrhoea.

The most common presenting symptom of neoplasms (both benign and malignant) is an asymptomatic swelling. Pain is more common in patients with parotid cancer (10–29% feel pain) than those with benign neoplasms (only 2.5–4%), but pain itself it not diagnostic of malignancy.

Episodic swelling of major salivary glands accompanied by pain and related to salivary stimuli suggests duct obstruction.

Also need to assess the facial nerve. The facial nerve passes through the parotid so may be affected if there is a change in the parotid gland. Facial nerve paralysis in a previously untreated patient usually indicates that a tumour is malignant.

=== Physical examination ===
The superficial location of the salivary glands allows palpation and visual inspection. The inspection must be systematic, both intraorally and extraorally, so no area is missed.

For extraoral examination the patient's head should be inclined forward in order to maximally expose the parotid and submandibular glands. A normal parotid gland is barely palpable and a normal sublingual gland is not palpable.

Intraoral examination should include observations for asymmetry, discolouration, pulsation and obstructions in the duct orifices. Swelling of the deep lobe of the parotid gland may be seen intra-orally, and may also displace the tonsil. The minor salivary glands should be examined. The labial, buccal and posterior palatal mucosa should be dried with an air blower or tissue and pressed to assess the flow of saliva.

=== Salivary testing ===
Salivary stimulation

- This can be done by palpating the parotid gland, thus stimulating it. Assess to see whether there is saliva flowing from the parotid papilla.

Sialography

- Sialograms can identify changes in salivary gland architecture and are useful in the evaluation of major gland swellings
- It involves the instillation of a radioopaque fluid into the major gland ductal system. This outlines the major and minor ductal systems, and also gives an outline of the glandular tissue
- For example, sialadenitis creates an appearance known as "pruning of the tree" on a sialogram, where there are less branches visible from the duct system. Also, a space occupying lesion that occurs within or adjacent to a salivary gland can displace the normal anatomy of the gland. This may create an appearance known as "ball in hand" on a sialogram, where the ducts are curved around the mass of the lesion.

Sialochemistry

- The composition of saliva changes in disease states, and analysis of saliva for enzymes, electrolytes, hormones, drugs and immunisation status can be performed.

Radioisotope scintigraphy

- Gives an objective measure of isotope uptake and excretion using a gamma scintillation camera. After about 20 minutes, a salivary stimulant will be given to promote salivary flow through the gland. They are used to assess patients with persistent symptoms of dry mouth and also to evaluate salivary gland swelling due to infection, inflammation or obstruction.

=== Further tests ===
- Imagining techniques
  - Ultrasounds, CT Scans or MRIs can aid with disease localisation
- Sialoendoscopy
  - A camera is inserted into the duct of a salivary gland to assess blockages
- Biopsy
  - This can be done by fine needle aspiration biopsy, which provides an opportunity to obtain information about the histology of a salivary tumour prior to initiation of treatment.

== Additional images ==
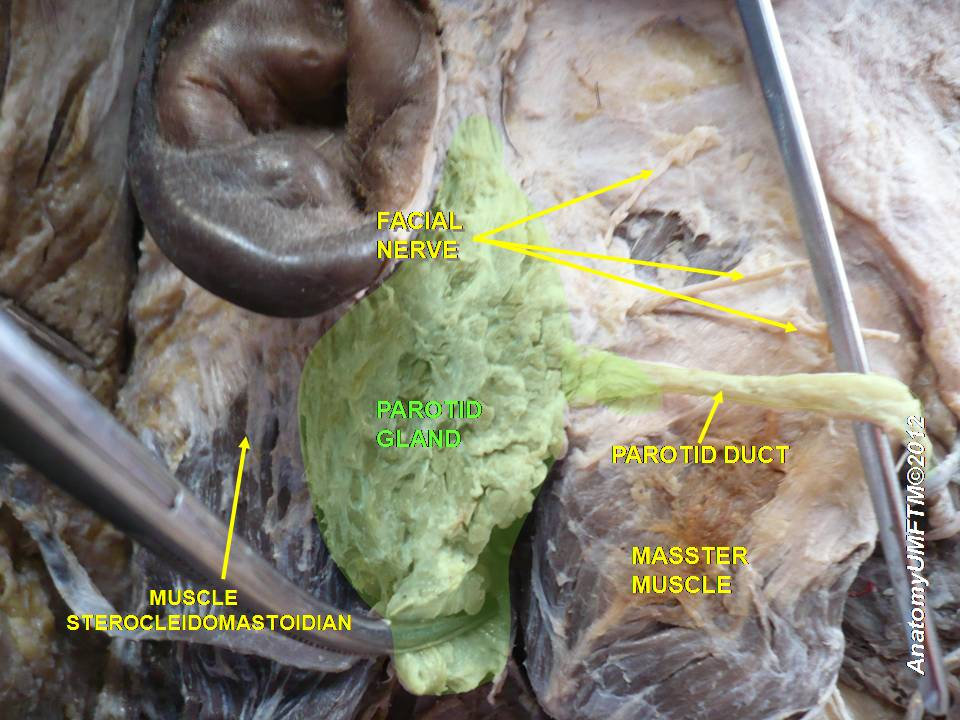
Parotid gland (incorrect muscle name)

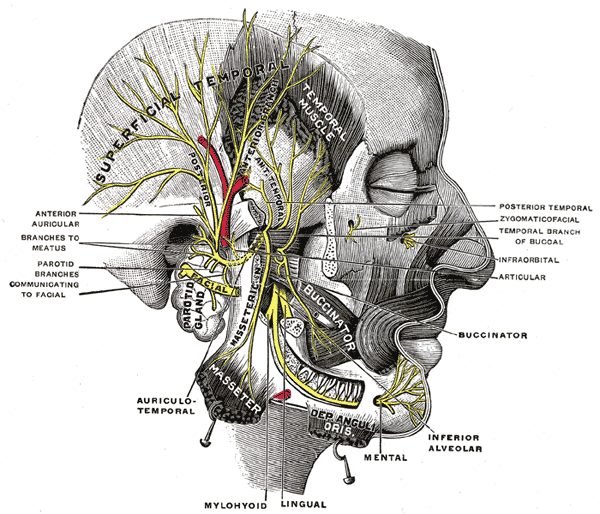
Mandibular division of the trigeminal nerve (fifth cranial nerve)

== See also ==
- Sjögren's syndrome
- John Leonora
- Juxtaoral organ of Chievitz
- List of organs of the human body
