= Tympanic canaliculus =

Passage of the tympanic branch of the glossopharyngeal nerve through the temporal bone

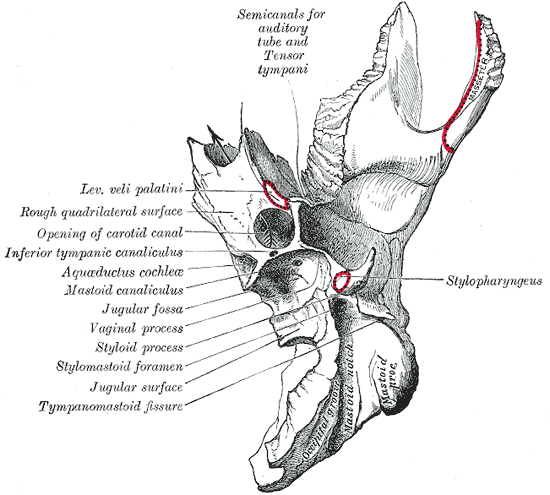
- Left temporal bone. Inferior surface. (tympanic canaliculus labeled at left, fourth from the top.)

Details

Identifiers
- Latin: canaliculus tympanicus
- TA98: A02.1.06.049
- TA2: 685
- FMA: 56460

The tympanic canaliculus (also Jacobson's canaliculus, tympanic canal, inferior tympanic canaliculus, or temporal canaliculus) is a minute canal in the bony ridge that separates the carotid canal and jugular foramen. The proximal opening of the canal is situated upon the inferior surface of the petrous part of the temporal bone; its distal opening is situated upon the floor of the tympanic cavity. The canal gives passage to the tympanic nerve (tympanic branch of the glossopharyngeal nerve) (CN IX)) and inferior tympanic artery
