= Parasympathetic nervous system =

Division of the autonomic nervous system

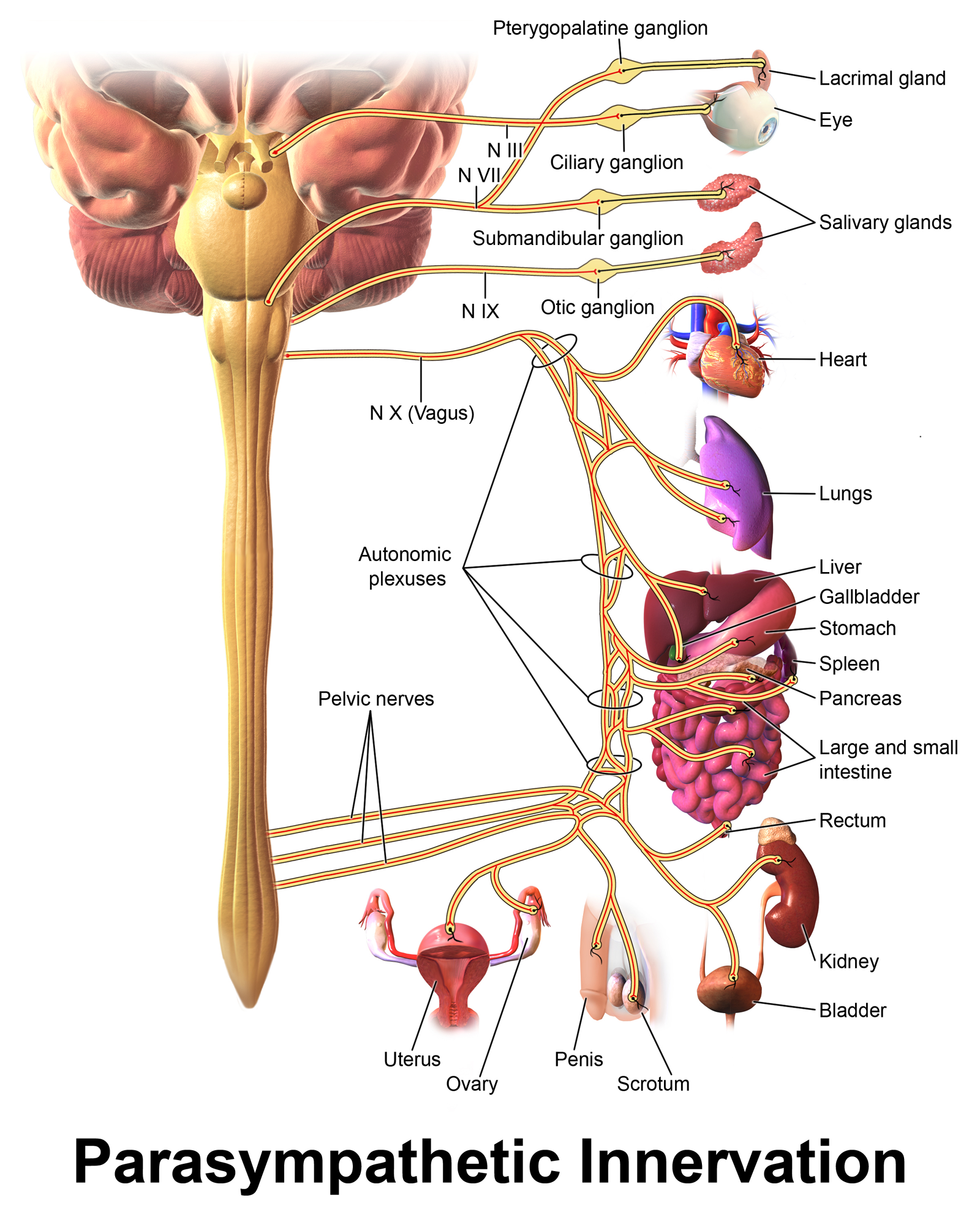
- Autonomic nervous system innervation, showing the parasympathetic (craniosacral) systems and target organs.

Details
- Synonyms: Parasympathetic autonomic nervous system

Identifiers
- Latin: pars parasympathica divisionis autonomici systematis
- Acronym: PSNS or PANS
- MeSH: D010275
- TA98: A14.3.02.001
- TA2: 6661
- FMA: 9907

The parasympathetic nervous system (PSNS) is one of the three divisions of the autonomic nervous system, the others being the sympathetic nervous system and the enteric nervous system.

The autonomic nervous system is responsible for regulating the body's unconscious actions. The parasympathetic system is responsible for stimulation of "rest-and-digest" or "feed-and-breed" activities that occur when the body is at rest, especially after eating, including sexual arousal, salivation, lacrimation (tears), urination, digestion, and defecation. Its action is described as being complementary to that of the sympathetic nervous system, which is responsible for stimulating activities associated with the fight-or-flight response. In contrast to the sympathetic division, which predominates during acute stress responses, parasympathetic activity promotes energy conservation, metabolic storage (for example by enhancing glycogen synthesis), and the maintenance of internal homeostasis over longer time scales.

Beyond its role in visceral motor control, parasympathetic activity—particularly via the vagus nerve—forms part of an "inflammatory reflex" in which efferent vagal fibers, acting through cholinergic signaling, dampen the release of pro-inflammatory cytokines and thereby modulate innate immune responses. Non-invasive indices such as heart rate variability (HRV), especially measures that reflect vagal modulation of the sinoatrial node, are widely used as surrogate markers of cardiac parasympathetic tone in research and clinical settings.

Nerve fibres of the parasympathetic nervous system arise from the central nervous system. Specific nerves include several cranial nerves, specifically the oculomotor nerve, facial nerve, glossopharyngeal nerve, and vagus nerve. Three spinal nerves in the sacrum (S2–4), commonly referred to as the pelvic splanchnic nerves, also act as parasympathetic nerves.

Because of its location, the parasympathetic system is commonly referred to as having "craniosacral outflow", which stands in contrast to the sympathetic nervous system, which is said to have "thoracolumbar outflow".

== Structure ==
The parasympathetic nerves are autonomic or visceral branches of the peripheral nervous system (PNS). Parasympathetic nerve supply arises through three primary areas:

1. Certain cranial nerves in the cranium, namely the preganglionic parasympathetic nerves (CN III, CN VII, CN IX and CN X) usually arise from specific nuclei in the central nervous system (CNS) and synapse at one of four parasympathetic ganglia: ciliary, pterygopalatine, otic, or submandibular. From these four ganglia the parasympathetic nerves complete their journey to target tissues via trigeminal branches (ophthalmic nerve, maxillary nerve, mandibular nerve).
2. The vagus nerve (CN X) does not participate in these cranial ganglia as most of its parasympathetic fibers are destined for a broad array of ganglia on or near thoracic viscera (esophagus, trachea, heart, lungs) and abdominal viscera (stomach, pancreas, liver, kidneys, small intestine, and about half of the large intestine). The vagus innervation ends at the junction between the midgut and hindgut, just before the splenic flexure of the transverse colon.
3. The pelvic splanchnic efferent preganglionic nerve cell bodies reside in the intermediolateral cell column (also termed the sacral parasympathetic nucleus) of the sacral spinal cord segments S2–S4, and their axons exit the vertebral column in the anterior rami of the corresponding spinal nerves before forming the pelvic splanchnic nerves. Their axons continue away from the CNS to synapse at autonomic ganglia that are usually in, or very close to, the wall of the organ of innervation. This differs from the sympathetic nervous system, where synapses between pre- and post-ganglionic efferent nerves in general occur at ganglia that are farther away from the target organ.

As in the sympathetic nervous system, efferent parasympathetic nerve signals are carried from the central nervous system to their targets by a system of two neurons. The first neuron in this pathway is referred to as the preganglionic or presynaptic neuron. Its cell body sits in the central nervous system and its axon usually extends to synapse with the dendrites of a postganglionic neuron somewhere else in the body. The axons of presynaptic parasympathetic neurons are usually long, extending from the CNS into a ganglion that is either very close to or embedded in their target organ. As a result, the postsynaptic parasympathetic nerve fibers are very short. In contrast to the relatively discrete end-organs of the somatic nervous system, many parasympathetic postganglionic fibers form varicosities along their length and release neurotransmitter diffusely, influencing a wider field of smooth muscle and glandular tissue.

=== Cranial nerves ===
The oculomotor nerve is responsible for a number of parasympathetic functions related to the eye. The oculomotor PNS fibers originate in the Edinger–Westphal nucleus in the central nervous system and travel through the superior orbital fissure to synapse in the ciliary ganglion located just behind the orbit (eye). From the ciliary ganglion the postganglionic parasympathetic fibers leave via short ciliary nerve fibers, a continuation of the nasociliary nerve (a branch of ophthalmic division of the trigeminal nerve (CN V_{1})). The short ciliary nerves innervate the orbit to control the ciliary muscle (responsible for accommodation) and the iris sphincter muscle, which is responsible for miosis or constriction of the pupil (in response to light or accommodation). There are two motors that are part of the oculomotor nerve known as the somatic motor and visceral motor. The somatic motor is responsible for moving the eye in precise motions and for keeping the eye fixated on an object. The visceral motor helps constrict the pupil.

The parasympathetic aspect of the facial nerve controls secretion of the sublingual and submandibular salivary glands, the lacrimal gland, and the glands associated with the nasal cavity. The preganglionic fibers originate within the CNS in the superior salivatory nucleus and leave as the intermediate nerve (which some consider a separate cranial nerve altogether) to connect with the facial nerve just distal (further out) to it surfacing the central nervous system. Just after the facial nerve geniculate ganglion (general sensory ganglion) in the temporal bone, the facial nerve gives off two separate parasympathetic nerves. The first is the greater petrosal nerve and the second is the chorda tympani. The greater petrosal nerve travels through the middle ear and eventually combines with the deep petrosal nerve (sympathetic fibers) to form the nerve of the pterygoid canal. The parasympathetic fibers of the nerve of the pterygoid canal synapse at the pterygopalatine ganglion, which is closely associated with the maxillary division of the trigeminal nerve (CN V_{2}). The postganglionic parasympathetic fibers leave the pterygopalatine ganglion in several directions. One division leaves on the zygomatic division of CN V_{2} and travels on a communicating branch to unite with the lacrimal nerve (branch of the ophthalmic nerve of CN V_{1}) before synapsing at the lacrimal gland. These parasympathetic to the lacrimal gland control tear production.

A separate group of parasympathetic leaving from the pterygopalatine ganglion are the descending palatine nerves (CN V_{2} branch), which include the greater and lesser palatine nerves. The greater palatine parasympathetic synapse on the hard palate and regulate mucous glands located there. The lesser palatine nerve synapses at the soft palate and controls sparse taste receptors and mucous glands. Yet another set of divisions from the pterygopalatine ganglion are the posterior, superior, and inferior lateral nasal nerves; and the nasopalatine nerves (all branches of CN V_{2}, maxillary division of the trigeminal nerve) that bring parasympathetic innervation to glands of the nasal mucosa. The second parasympathetic branch that leaves the facial nerve is the chorda tympani. This nerve carries secretomotor fibers to the submandibular and sublingual glands. The chorda tympani travels through the middle ear and attaches to the lingual nerve (mandibular division of trigeminal, CN V_{3}). After joining the lingual nerve, the preganglionic fibers synapse at the submandibular ganglion and send postganglionic fibers to the sublingual and submandibular salivary glands.

The glossopharyngeal nerve has parasympathetic fibers that innervate the parotid salivary gland. The preganglionic fibers depart CN IX as the tympanic nerve and continue to the middle ear where they make up a tympanic plexus on the cochlear promontory of the mesotympanum. The tympanic plexus of nerves rejoin and form the lesser petrosal nerve and exit through the foramen ovale to synapse at the otic ganglion. From the otic ganglion postganglionic parasympathetic fibers travel with the auriculotemporal nerve (mandibular branch of trigeminal, CN V_{3}) to the parotid salivary gland.

=== Vagus nerve ===
The vagus nerve, named after the Latin word vagus (because the nerve controls such a broad range of target tissues – vagus in Latin literally means "wandering"), contains parasympathetic fibers that originate in the dorsal nucleus of the vagus nerve and the nucleus ambiguus in the CNS. The vagus nerve can be readily identified in the neck both on ultrasound and magnetic resonance imaging. It has several branches. The largest branch is the recurrent laryngeal nerve. From the left vagus nerve the recurrent laryngeal nerve hooks around the aorta to travel back up to the larynx and proximal esophagus while, from the right vagus nerve, the recurrent laryngeal nerve hooks around the right subclavian artery to travel back up to the same location as its counterpart. These different paths are a direct result of embryological development of the circulatory system. Each recurrent laryngeal nerve supplies the larynx, the heart, the trachea and the esophagus.

Another set of nerves that come off the vagus nerves approximately at the level of entering the thorax are the cardiac branches of the vagus nerve. These cardiac branches go on to form cardiac and pulmonary plexuses around the heart and lungs. As the main vagus nerves continue into the thorax they become intimately linked with the esophagus and sympathetic nerves from the sympathetic trunks to form the esophageal plexus. This is very efficient as the major function of the vagus nerve from there on will be control of the gut smooth muscles and glands. As the esophageal plexus enter the abdomen through the esophageal hiatus anterior and posterior vagus trunks form. The vagus trunks then join with preaortic sympathetic ganglion around the aorta to disperse with the blood vessels and sympathetic nerves throughout the abdomen. The extent of the parasympathetic in the abdomen include the pancreas, kidneys, liver, gall bladder, stomach and gut tube. The vagus contribution of parasympathetic continues down the gut tube until the end of the midgut. The midgut ends two thirds of the way across the transverse colon near the splenic flexure. Centrally, vagal preganglionic neurons receive convergent input from the nucleus tractus solitarii, hypothalamus, and limbic structures such as the amygdala, integrating visceral sensory information with emotional and cognitive influences on autonomic output.

=== Pelvic splanchnic nerves ===
The pelvic splanchnic nerves, S2–4, work in tandem to innervate the pelvic viscera. Unlike in the cranium, where one parasympathetic is in charge of one particular tissue or region, for the most part the pelvic splanchnics each contribute fibers to pelvic viscera by traveling to one or more plexuses before being dispersed to the target tissue. These plexuses are composed of mixed autonomic nerve fibers (parasympathetic and sympathetic) and include the vesical, prostatic, rectal, uterovaginal, and inferior hypogastric plexuses. The preganglionic neurons in the pathway do not synapse in a ganglion as in the cranium but rather in the walls of the tissues or organs that they innervate. The fiber paths are variable and each individual's autonomic nervous system in the pelvis is unique. The visceral tissues in the pelvis that the parasympathetic nerve pathway controls include those of the urinary bladder, ureters, urinary sphincter, anal sphincter, uterus, prostate, glands, vagina, and penis. Unconsciously, the parasympathetic will cause peristaltic movements of the ureters and intestines, moving urine from the kidneys into the bladder and food down the intestinal tract and, upon necessity, the parasympathetic will assist in excreting urine from the bladder or defecation. Stimulation of the parasympathetic will cause the detrusor muscle (urinary bladder wall) to contract and simultaneously relax the internal sphincter muscle between the bladder and the urethra, allowing the bladder to void. Also, parasympathetic stimulation of the internal anal sphincter will relax this muscle to allow defecation. There are other skeletal muscles involved with these processes but the parasympathetic plays a huge role in continence and bowel retention.

A study published in 2016 suggests that all sacral autonomic output may be sympathetic; indicating that the rectum, bladder and reproductive organs may only be innervated by the sympathetic nervous system. This suggestion is based on detailed analysis of 15 phenotypic and ontogenetic factors differentiating sympathetic from parasympathetic neurons in the mouse. Assuming that the reported findings most likely applies to other mammals as well, this perspective suggests a simplified, bipartite architecture of the autonomic nervous system, in which the parasympathetic nervous system receives input from cranial nerves exclusively and the sympathetic nervous system from thoracic to sacral spinal nerves. This reinterpretation has been controversial, and subsequent anatomical and physiological analyses have argued that the sacral autonomic outflow fulfills classical criteria for a parasympathetic division and should continue to be classified as such, in line with Langley's original tripartite scheme.

Autonomic nervous system's jurisdiction to organs in the human body
| Organ | Nerves | Spinal column origin |
|---|---|---|
| stomach | PS: anterior and posterior vagal trunks; S: greater splanchnic nerves | T5, T6, T7, T8, T9, sometimes T10 |
| duodenum | PS: vagus nerves; S: greater splanchnic nerves | T5, T6, T7, T8, T9, sometimes T10 |
| jejunum and ileum | PS: posterior vagal trunks; S: greater splanchnic nerves | T5, T6, T7, T8, T9 |
| spleen | S: greater splanchnic nerves | T6, T7, T8 |
| gallbladder and liver | PS: vagus nerve; S: celiac plexus; right phrenic nerve | T6, T7, T8, T9 |
| colon | PS: vagus nerves and pelvic splanchnic nerves; S: lesser and least splanchnic nerves | T10, T11, T12 (proximal colon); L1, L2, L3, (distal colon) |
| pancreatic head | PS: vagus nerves; S: thoracic splanchnic nerves | T8, T9 |
| appendix | nerves to superior mesenteric plexus | T10 |
| bladder | PS: pelvic splanchnic nerves to detrusor muscles; S: inferior hypogastric nerves | S2-S4 |
| kidneys and ureters | PS: vagus nerve; S: thoracic and lumbar splanchnic nerves | T11, T12 |

== Function ==
=== Sensation ===
The afferent fibers of the autonomic nervous system, which transmit sensory information from the internal organs of the body back to the central nervous system, are not divided into parasympathetic and sympathetic fibers as the efferent fibers are. Instead, autonomic sensory information is conducted by general visceral afferent fibers.

General visceral afferent sensations are mostly unconscious visceral motor reflex sensations from hollow organs and glands that are transmitted to the CNS. While the unconscious reflex arcs normally are undetectable, in certain instances they may send pain sensations to the CNS masked as referred pain. If the peritoneal cavity becomes inflamed or if the bowel is suddenly distended, the body will interpret the afferent pain stimulus as somatic in origin. This pain is usually non-localized. The pain is also usually referred to dermatomes that are at the same spinal nerve level as the visceral afferent synapse.

=== Vascular effects ===
Heart rate is largely controlled by the heart's internal pacemaker activity. Considering a healthy heart, the main pacemaker is a collection of cells on the border of the atria and vena cava called the sinoatrial node. Heart cells have the ability to generate electrical activity independent of external stimulation. As a result, the cells of the node spontaneously generate electrical activity that is subsequently conducted throughout the heart, resulting in a regular heart rate.

In absence of any external stimuli, sinoatrial pacing contributes to maintain the heart rate in the range of 60–100 beats per minute (bpm). At the same time, the two branches of the autonomic nervous system act in a complementary way increasing or slowing the heart rate. In this context, the vagus nerve acts on sinoatrial node slowing its conduction thus actively modulating vagal tone accordingly. This modulation is mediated by the neurotransmitter acetylcholine and downstream changes to ionic currents and calcium of heart cells.

The vagus nerve plays a crucial role in heart rate regulation by modulating the response of sinoatrial node; vagal tone can be quantified by investigating heart rate modulation induced by vagal tone changes. As a general consideration, increased vagal tone (and thus vagal action) is associated with a diminished and more variable heart rate. The main mechanism by which the parasympathetic nervous system acts on vascular and cardiac control is the so-called respiratory sinus arrhythmia (RSA). RSA is described as the physiological and rhythmical fluctuation of heart rate at the respiration frequency, characterized by heart rate increase during inspiration and decrease during expiration.

Heart rate variability (HRV) analysis, particularly time-domain indices such as the root mean square of successive differences (RMSSD) and the high-frequency (HF) component of the HRV spectrum, primarily reflects parasympathetic modulation of the sinoatrial node and is therefore widely used as a non-invasive index of cardiac vagal tone. Reduced HRV and impaired vagal modulation are associated with adverse outcomes in heart failure and other cardiovascular diseases and are increasingly investigated as biomarkers of biological aging and "inflammaging".

=== Homeostatic and anti-inflammatory functions ===
Parasympathetic outflow, particularly via the vagus nerve, participates in several reflex circuits that stabilize internal milieu beyond classical cardiovascular and gastrointestinal control. The "cholinergic anti-inflammatory pathway" describes an efferent arm of the inflammatory reflex in which action potentials in vagal fibers ultimately signal to immune cells—predominantly via α7 nicotinic acetylcholine receptors—to suppress the production of tumor necrosis factor and other pro-inflammatory cytokines during systemic inflammatory responses.

Experimental studies in models of sepsis, inflammatory bowel disease, and rheumatoid arthritis have shown that electrical stimulation of the vagus nerve, stimulation of the splenic nerve, or pharmacological activation of nicotinic receptors can attenuate cytokine release and improve survival, supporting a role for parasympathetic pathways in controlling systemic inflammation. Early-phase clinical studies are exploring whether invasive or non-invasive vagus nerve stimulation can harness this pathway therapeutically in chronic inflammatory and autoimmune diseases.

=== Sexual activity ===
Another role that the parasympathetic nervous system plays is in sexual activity. In males, the cavernous nerves from the prostatic plexus stimulate smooth muscles in the fibrous trabeculae of the coiled helicine arteries of penis to relax and allow blood to fill the two corpora cavernosa and the corpus spongiosum of the penis, making it rigid to prepare for sexual activity. Upon emission of ejaculate, the sympathetics participate and cause peristalsis of the ductus deferens and closure of the internal urethral sphincter to prevent semen from entering the bladder. At the same time, parasympathetics cause peristalsis of the urethral muscle, and the pudendal nerve causes contraction of the bulbospongiosus (skeletal muscle is not via PN), to forcibly emit the semen. During remission the penis becomes flaccid again. In the female, there is erectile tissue analogous to the male yet less substantial that plays a large role in sexual stimulation. The PN cause release of secretions in the female that decrease friction. Also in the female, the parasympathetics innervate the fallopian tubes, which helps peristaltic contractions and movement of the oocyte to the uterus for implantation. The secretions from the female genital tract aid in sperm migration. The PN (and SN to a lesser extent) play a significant role in reproduction.

=== Receptors ===
The parasympathetic nervous system uses chiefly acetylcholine (ACh) as its neurotransmitter, although peptides (such as cholecystokinin) can be used. The ACh acts on two types of receptors, the muscarinic and nicotinic cholinergic receptors. Most transmissions occur in two stages: When stimulated, the preganglionic neuron releases ACh at the ganglion, which acts on nicotinic receptors of postganglionic neurons. The postganglionic neuron then releases ACh to stimulate the muscarinic receptors of the target organ. Nicotinic receptors transmit outgoing signals from the presynaptic to the postsynaptic cells within the sympathetic and parasympathetic nervous system, and are the receptors used in the somatic nervous system for signalling muscular contraction in the neuromuscular junction. The muscarinic receptors are mainly present in the parasympathetic nervous system but also appear in the sweat glands of the sympathetic nervous system.

==== Types of muscarinic receptors ====
The five main types of muscarinic receptors:

- The M1 muscarinic receptors (CHRM1) are located in the neural system.
- The M2 muscarinic receptors (CHRM2) are located in the heart, and act to bring the heart back to normal after the actions of the sympathetic nervous system: slowing down the heart rate, reducing contractile forces of the atrial cardiac muscle, and reducing conduction velocity of the sinoatrial node and atrioventricular node. They have a minimal effect on the contractile forces of the ventricular muscle due to sparse innervation of the ventricles from the parasympathetic nervous system.
- The M3 muscarinic receptors (CHRM3) are located at many places in the body, such as the endothelial cells of blood vessels, as well as the lungs causing bronchoconstriction. The net effect of innervated M3 receptors on blood vessels is vasodilation, as acetylcholine causes endothelial cells to produce nitric oxide, which diffuses to smooth muscle and results in vasodilation. They are also in the smooth muscles of the gastrointestinal tract, which help in increasing intestinal motility and dilating sphincters. The M3 receptors are also located in many glands that help to stimulate secretion in salivary glands and other glands of the body. They are also located on the detrusor muscle and urothelium of the bladder, causing contraction.
- The M4 muscarinic receptors: Postganglionic cholinergic nerves, possible CNS effects.
- The M5 muscarinic receptors: Possible effects on the CNS, including modulation of dopaminergic transmission in midbrain pathways.

==== Types of nicotinic receptors ====
In vertebrates, nicotinic receptors are broadly classified into two subtypes based on their primary sites of expression: muscle-type nicotinic receptors (N1) primarily for somatic motor neurons; and neuronal-type nicotinic receptors (N2) primarily for autonomic nervous system.

=== Relationship to sympathetic nervous system ===
Sympathetic and parasympathetic divisions typically function in opposition to each other. The sympathetic division typically functions in actions requiring quick responses. The parasympathetic division functions with actions that do not require immediate reaction. A mnemonic to summarize the functions of the parasympathetic nervous system is SSLUDD (sexual arousal, salivation, lacrimation, urination, digestion and defecation).

== Clinical significance ==
The functions promoted by activity in the parasympathetic nervous system are associated with day-to-day living. The parasympathetic nervous system promotes digestion and the synthesis of glycogen, and allows for normal function and behavior.

Parasympathetic action helps in digestion and absorption of food by increasing the activity of the intestinal musculature, increasing gastric secretion, and relaxing the pyloric sphincter. It is called the “rest and digest” division of the ANS.

The parasympathetic nervous system decreases respiration and heart rate and increases digestion. Stimulation of the parasympathetic nervous system results in:

- Constriction of pupils
- Decreased heart rate and blood pressure
- Constriction of bronchial muscles
- Stimulation of digestion and gastric emptying
- Increased production of saliva and mucus
- Increase in urine secretion

=== Autonomic imbalance and cardiovascular disease ===
An imbalance between sympathetic and parasympathetic activity, often characterized by heightened sympathetic drive and reduced vagal tone, is a common feature of chronic heart failure, post–myocardial infarction states, and certain arrhythmias. Reduced HRV and impaired baroreflex sensitivity are associated with higher mortality and sudden cardiac death in these populations. Therapies such as β-adrenergic blockade, exercise training, and in some cases vagus nerve stimulation have been investigated as means to restore autonomic balance and improve outcomes.

=== Inflammatory, gastrointestinal and metabolic disorders ===
Dysregulation of parasympathetic activity has been implicated in inflammatory bowel disease (IBD) and other chronic inflammatory conditions. Patients with IBD and functional gastrointestinal disorders show evidence of reduced vagal tone and altered brain–gut autonomic regulation, which may contribute to increased disease activity and comorbid anxiety and depression. Similarly, decreased HRV and impaired parasympathetic function are reported in metabolic disorders such as type 2 diabetes mellitus and obesity, and are associated with increased cardiovascular risk.

=== Psychiatric and stress-related conditions ===
Low resting vagal tone and reduced HRV have been linked to a variety of psychiatric and stress-related conditions, including major depressive disorder, generalized anxiety disorder, and post-traumatic stress disorder. These findings support models in which parasympathetic flexibility contributes to adaptive emotional regulation and social engagement. HRV biofeedback and other behavioral interventions that aim to enhance vagal tone are being studied as adjunctive treatments in these disorders.

=== Therapeutic modulation of parasympathetic activity ===
Invasive cervical vagus nerve stimulation is an established treatment for refractory epilepsy and treatment-resistant depression and is being investigated for additional indications such as heart failure and inflammatory diseases. Non-invasive approaches, including transcutaneous auricular vagus nerve stimulation and HRV-guided neuromodulation, seek to modulate parasympathetic activity without surgery and are under active investigation.

== History ==
The terminology "parasympathetic nervous system" was introduced by John Newport Langley in 1921. He was the first person who put forward the concept of PSNS as the second division of the autonomic nervous system.

== See also ==
- Sympathetic nervous system
- Acetylcholine
- Choline
- Cholinergic receptor
- Nicotinic acetylcholine receptor
- Muscarinic acetylcholine receptor
