= Lesser petrosal nerve =

Nerve of the parotid gland

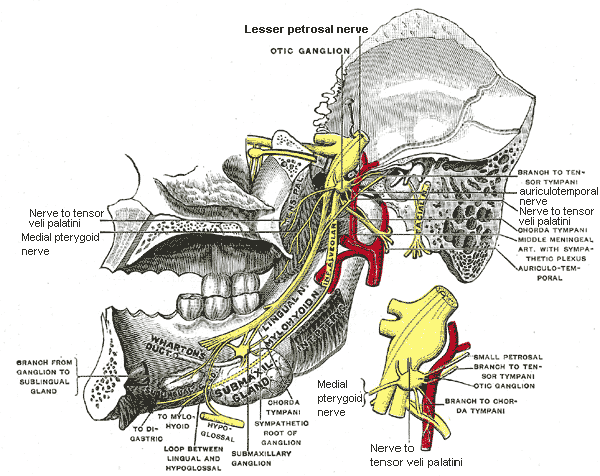
- Mandibular division of trigeminal nerve, seen from the middle line. The small figure is an enlarged view of the otic ganglion. (Small petrosal labeled at center top and bottom right.)

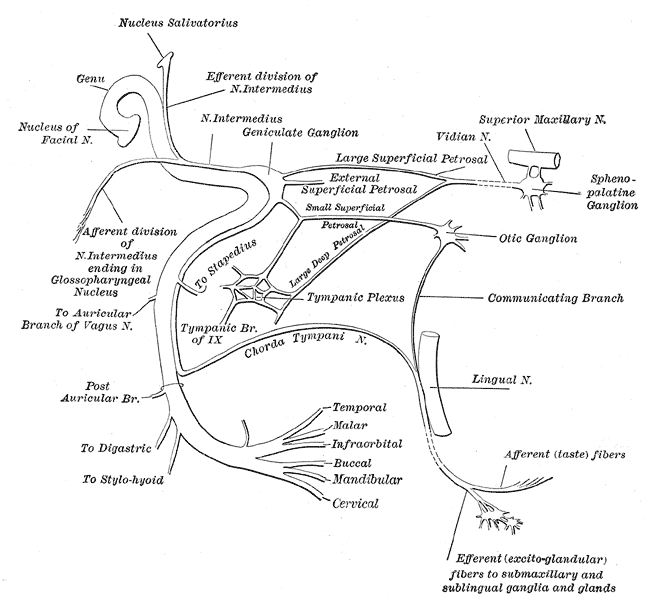
- Plan of the facial and intermediate nerves and their communication with other nerves.

Details
- From: Tympanic plexus
- To: Otic ganglion
- Innervates: Parotid gland

Identifiers
- Latin: nervus petrosus minor
- TA98: A14.2.01.149
- TA2: 6326
- FMA: 53491

The lesser petrosal nerve (also known as the small superficial petrosal nerve) is the general visceral efferent (GVE) nerve conveying pre-ganglionic parasympathetic secretomotor fibers for the parotid gland from the tympanic plexus to the otic ganglion (where they synapse). It passes out of the tympanic cavity through the petrous part of the temporal bone into the middle cranial fossa of the cranial cavity, then exits the cranial cavity through its own canaliculus to reach the infratemporal fossa.

Cell bodies of the lesser petrosal nerve are situated in the inferior salivatory nucleus, and are conveyed first by the glossopharyngeal nerve (CN IX) and then by the tympanic nerve to the tympanic plexus.

== Structure ==
=== Course ===
The nucleus of the lesser petrosal nerve is the inferior salivatory nucleus. The lesser petrosal nerve may be considered a continuation of the tympanic nerve.

After arising in the tympanic plexus, the lesser petrosal nerve passes anterior-ward, then through the hiatus for lesser petrosal nerve on the anterior surface of the petrous part of the temporal bone into the middle cranial fossa.

It runs across the floor of this fossa along a groove oriented in the direction the foramen ovale and situated parallel and anterolateral to the groove for the greater petrosal nerve and its groove.

It exits the skull via canaliculus innominatus and enters the infratemporal fossa. In the fossa, its fibres synapse at the otic ganglion. Post-ganglionic fibres then exit the ganglion to briefly travel along with the auriculotemporal nerve (a branch of the mandibular nerve (CN V_{3})) before entering the substance of the parotid gland.

The lesser petrosal nerve distributes its post-ganglionic parasympathetic (GVE) fibers to the parotid gland via the intraparotid plexus (or parotid plexus), the branches from the facial nerve in the parotid gland.

== See also ==
- Tympanic nerve
- Glossopharyngeal Nerve, Overview of visceral motor component
