= Stylopharyngeal branch of glossopharyngeal nerve =

Details
- From: glossopharyngeal nerve

Identifiers
- Latin: ramus musculi stylopharyngei nervi glossopharyngei
- TA98: A14.2.01.145
- TA2: 6328
- FMA: 53487

The stylopharyngeal branch of glossopharyngeal nerve is distributed to the Stylopharyngeus.
