= Tonsillar branches of glossopharyngeal nerve =

Nerves supplying the tonsils

Details
- From: Glossopharyngeal nerve

Identifiers
- Latin: Rami tonsillares nervi glossopharyngei
- TA98: A14.2.01.147; A14.2.01.048
- TA2: 6330
- FMA: 53489

The tonsillar branches of glossopharyngeal nerve supply the palatine tonsil, forming around it a plexus from which filaments are distributed to the soft palate and fauces, where they communicate with the palatine nerves.
