= Inferior ganglion of glossopharyngeal nerve =

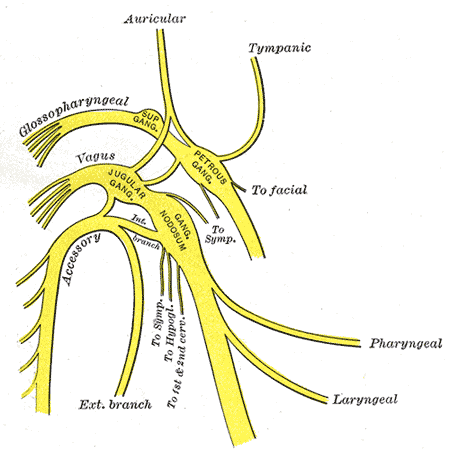
- Plan of upper portions of glossopharyngeal, vagus, and accessory nerves. (Inferior ganglion of the glossopharyngeal nerve labeled as ‘petrous gang’.

Details
- From: Glossopharyngeal nerve

Identifiers
- Latin: ganglion inferius nervi glossopharyngei, ganglion petrosum
- TA98: A14.2.01.137
- TA2: 6322
- FMA: 53475

The inferior ganglion of the glossopharyngeal nerve (petrosal ganglion) is a sensory ganglion. It is larger than and inferior to the superior ganglion of the glossopharyngeal nerve. It is located within the jugular foramen.

The pseudounipolar neurons of the inferior ganglion of the glossopharyngeal nerve provide sensory innervation to areas around the tongue and pharynx. More specifically:

1. innervation of taste buds on the posterior 1/3 of tongue
2. general sensory innervation of posterior 1/3 of tongue, soft palate, palatine tonsils, upper pharynx and Eustachian tubes
3. innervation of baroreceptor cells in the carotid sinus
4. innervation of glomus type I chemoreceptor cells in the carotid body

The central processes of the neurons which provide taste sensation synapse in the rostral portion of the solitary nucleus (also called the gustatory nucleus). The central processes of the neurons which provide general sensory information synapse in the spinal trigeminal nucleus. Finally, the central processes of the neurons which innervate the carotid sinus and carotid body synapse in the caudal portion of the solitary nucleus.

== Tympanic nerve ==
The tympanic nerve is the first branch of the glossopharyngeal nerve. It branches at the level of the inferior ganglion. Importantly, the axons which form the tympanic nerve do not synapse in this ganglion or have their cell bodies in it. The neuron cell bodies of the axons which form the tympanic nerve are found in the inferior salivatory nucleus and superior ganglion of the glossopharyngeal nerve.
