= Juxtaoral organ of Chievitz =

Brain structure

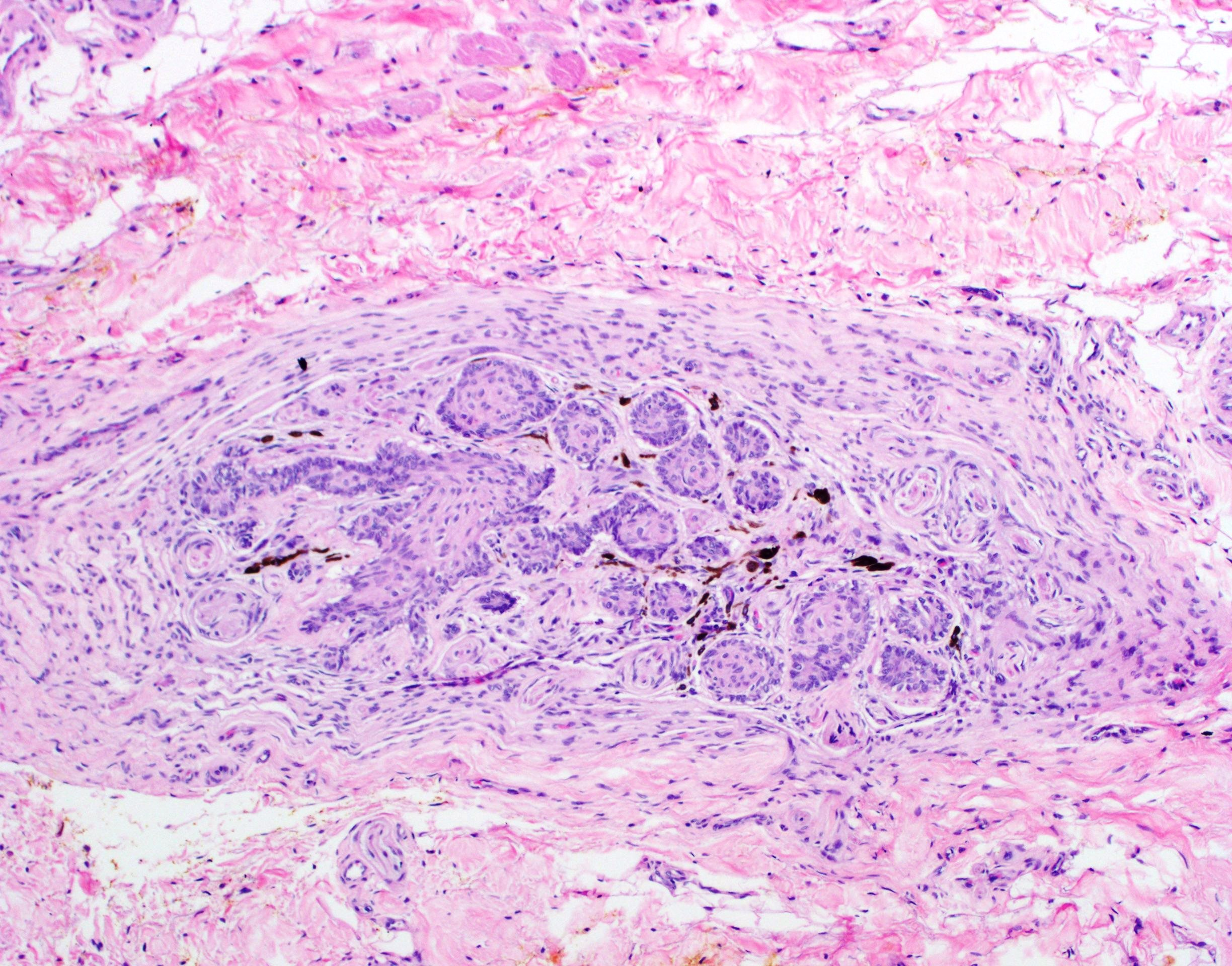
- The juxtaoral organ of Chievitz is composed of nests of benign squamoid epithelium closely associated with multiple nerve bundles. The deep location and squamous appearance can histologically mimic invasive squamous cell carcinoma. (Hematoxylin and Eosin stained section, 100x magnification)

Details
- Precursor: ectoderm

Identifiers
- TA98: A05.1.01.016
- TA2: 2142
- FMA: 77270

The juxtaoral organ in humans is a small longish structure (12.7 mm (half an inch) in length, 1–2 mm in diameter), situated medially to the medial pterygoid muscle. The organ consists of a central ramified cord of epithelial parenchyma, embedded in connective tissue particularly rich in nerve fibers and sensory receptors. Close relations exist between epithelial cells and nerve endings. Histochemically, the parenchyma displays a characteristic pattern of various enzymes. Sporadically, epithelial follicles containing colloidal material can be found. The organ is surrounded by a dense, perineurium-like connective tissue.

Originally, the formation was known to embryologists only ("Chievitz Organ") and was considered to be a transient rudimentary structure, disappearing before birth. In 1953, Wolfgang Zenker proved that the formation shows further development and can be found in adult humans with regularity. Since then, several studies have been performed on its comparative anatomy, histology, cytochemistry, and ultrastructural level. As soon as this structure had been shown to occur not only at all stages of human life but also in many other mammals and reptiles and since no signs of involution could be detected in any of the species investigated, it was renamed – from a topographical point of view – as "Juxtaoral organ" by Zenker and Salzer 1962.

The results of the studies of Zenker and his group on this organ as well as the history of research are summarised in the monograph Juxtaoral Organ: Morphology and Clinical aspects, Urban and Schwarzenberg, 1982.

It can very rarely be the site of a tumor. It was first noted in embryos by Johan Henrik Chievitz in 1885.
