= Promontory of tympanic cavity =

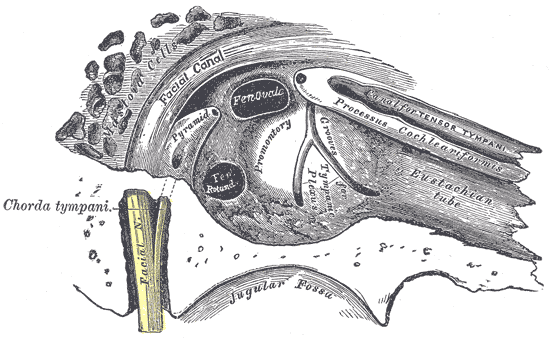
- View of the inner wall of the tympanum. (Promontory visible near center.)

Details

Identifiers
- Latin: promontorium tympani
- TA98: A15.3.02.011
- TA2: 6899
- FMA: 77694

The promontory of the tympanic cavity, also known as the cochlear promontory or petrosal promontorium, is a rounded hollow prominence upon - and most prominent feature of - the medial wall of the tympanic cavity formed by the underlying first turn of the cochlea. The surface of the promontory is furrowed by fine grooves that accommodate to the strands of the tympanic plexus.

The oval window is situated superoposteriorly to the promontory, and the round window inferoposteriorly to it.

A minute spicule of bone frequently connects the promontory to the pyramidal eminence.

== Evolution ==
In non-mammalian synapsids, the promontorium was not present. During the evolution of mammals, the shrinking and displacement of the basisphenoid allowed for the enlargement of the petrosal, of which the promontorium is a part. This is a major apomorphy by which the earliest mammals can be distinguished from their closest relatives.

== Additional images ==
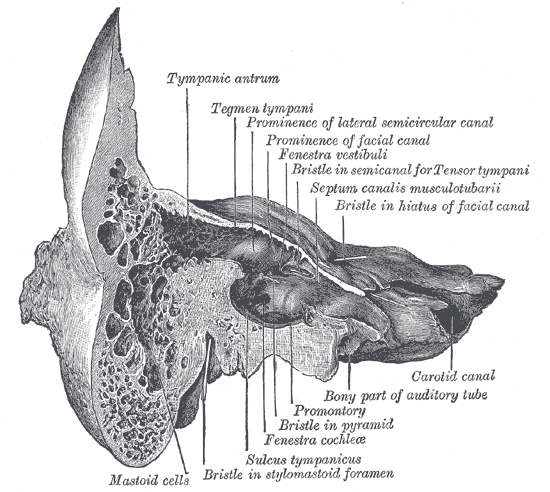
Coronal section of right temporal bone.

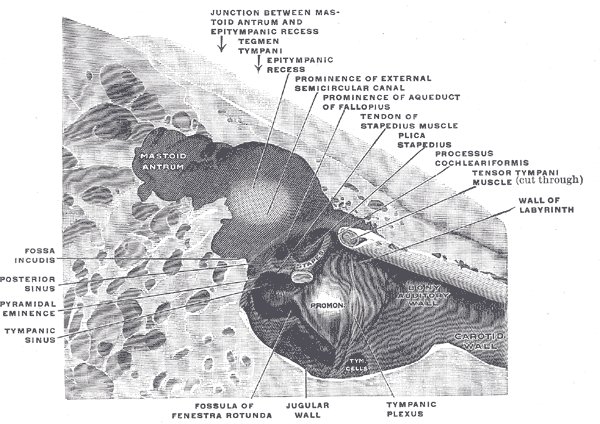
The medial wall and part of the posterior and anterior walls of the right tympanic cavity, lateral view.
