= Glossopharyngeal nerve =

Cranial nerve IX, for the tongue and pharynx

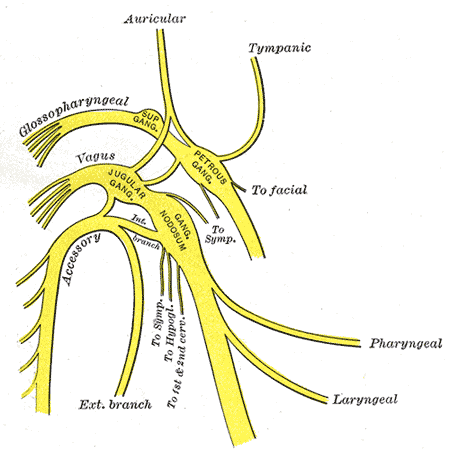
- Plan of the upper portions of the glossopharyngeal, vagus, and accessory nerves.

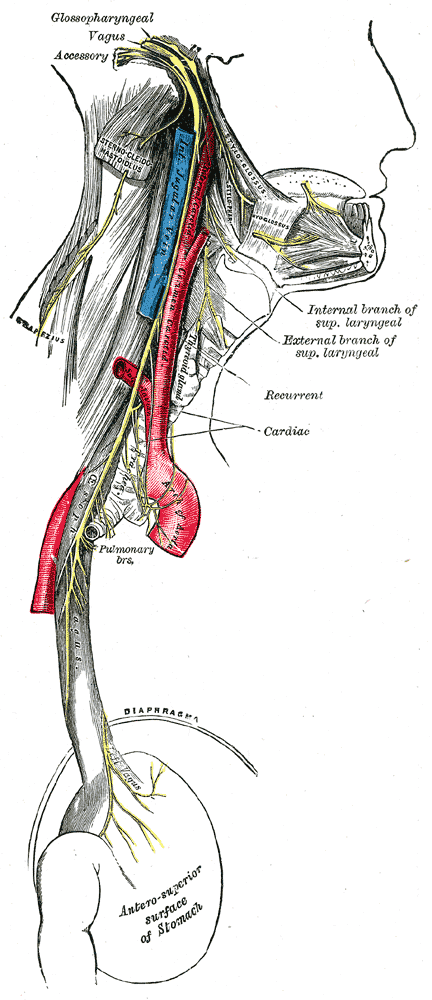
- Course and distribution of the glossopharyngeal, vagus, and accessory nerves. (Label for glossopharyngeal is at upper left.)

Details
- To: Tympanic nerve
- Innervates: Motor: stylopharyngeus Sensory: Oropharynx, Eustachian tube, middle ear, posterior third of tongue, carotid sinus, carotid body Special sensory: Taste to posterior third of tongue

Identifiers
- Latin: nervus glossopharyngeus
- MeSH: D005930
- NeuroNames: 701, 793
- NeuroLex ID: birnlex_1274
- TA98: A14.2.01.135
- TA2: 6320
- FMA: 50870

The glossopharyngeal nerve (/ˌɡlɒsoʊfəˈrɪn(d)ʒiəl, -ˌfærənˈdʒiːəl/), also known as the ninth cranial nerve, cranial nerve IX, or simply CN IX, is a cranial nerve that exits the brainstem from the sides of the upper medulla, just anterior (closer to the nose) to the vagus nerve. Being a mixed nerve (sensorimotor), it carries afferent sensory and efferent motor information. The motor division of the glossopharyngeal nerve is derived from the basal plate of the embryonic medulla oblongata, whereas the sensory division originates from the cranial neural crest.

== Structure ==
From the anterior portion of the medulla oblongata, the glossopharyngeal nerve passes laterally across or below the flocculus, and leaves the skull through the central part of the jugular foramen. From the superior and inferior ganglia in jugular foramen, it has its own sheath of dura mater. The inferior ganglion on the inferior surface of petrous part of temporal is related with a triangular depression into which the aqueduct of cochlea opens. On the inferior side, the glossopharyngeal nerve is lateral and anterior to the vagus nerve and accessory nerve.

In its passage through the foramen (with X and XI), the glossopharyngeal nerve passes between the internal jugular vein and internal carotid artery. It descends in front of the latter vessel and beneath the styloid process and the muscles connected with it, to the posterior lower border of the stylopharyngeus muscle. It then curves forward, forming an arch on the side of the neck and lying upon the stylopharyngeus and middle pharyngeal constrictor muscle. From there, it passes under cover of the hyoglossus muscle and is finally distributed to the palatine tonsil, the mucous membrane of the fauces and base of the tongue, and the serous glands of the mouth.

=== Branches ===
- tympanic nerve
- stylopharyngeal nerve
- tonsillar nerve
- carotid sinus nerve
- Branches to the posterior third of tongue
- lingual branches
- A communicating branch to the vagus nerve

Note: The glossopharyngeal nerve contributes in the formation of the pharyngeal plexus along with the vagus nerve.

The glossopharyngeal nerve has five distinct general functions:

1. Branchial motor (special visceral efferent) – supplies the stylopharyngeus muscle.
2. Visceral motor (general visceral efferent) – provides parasympathetic innervation of the parotid gland via the otic ganglion
3. Visceral sensory (general visceral afferent) – carries visceral sensory information from the carotid sinus and carotid body.
4. General sensory (general somatic afferent) – provides general sensory information from inner surface of the tympanic membrane, upper pharynx (GVA), and the posterior one-third of the tongue.
5. Visceral afferent (special visceral afferent) – provides taste sensation from the posterior one-third of the tongue, including circumvallate papillae.

The glossopharyngeal nerve as noted above is a mixed nerve consisting of both sensory and motor nerve fibers. The sensory fibers' origin include the pharynx, middle ear, posterior one-third of the tongue (including taste buds); and the carotid body and sinus. These fibers terminate at the medulla oblongata. The motor fibers' origin is the medulla oblongata, and they terminate at the parotid salivary gland, the glands of the posterior tongue, and the stylopharyngeus muscle (which dilates the pharynx during swallowing).

=== Overview of branchial motor component ===
The branchial motor component of CN IX provides voluntary control of the stylopharyngeus muscle, which elevates the pharynx during swallowing and speech.

Origin and central course

The branchial motor component originates from the nucleus ambiguus in the reticular formation of the rostral medulla. Fibers leaving the nucleus ambiguus travel anteriorly and laterally to exit the medulla, along with the other components of CN IX, between the olive and the inferior cerebellar peduncle.

Intracranial course

Upon emerging from the lateral aspect of the medulla the branchial motor component joins the other components of CN IX to exit the skull via the jugular foramen. The glossopharyngeal fibers travel just anterior to the cranial nerves X and XI, which also exit the skull via the jugular foramen.

Extra-cranial course and final innervation

Upon exiting the skull the branchial motor fibers descend deep to the temporal styloid process and wrap around the posterior border of the stylopharyngeus muscle before innervating it.

Voluntary control of the stylopharyngeus muscle

Signals for the voluntary movement of stylopharyngeus muscle originate in the pre-motor and motor cortex (in association with other cortical areas) and pass via the corticobulbar tract in the genu of the internal capsule to synapse bilaterally on the ambiguus nuclei in the medulla.

=== Overview of visceral motor component ===
Parasympathetic component of the glossopharyngeal nerve that innervates the ipsilateral parotid gland.

Origin and central course

The preganglionic nerve fibers originate in the inferior salivatory nucleus of the rostral medulla and travel anteriorly and laterally to exit the brainstem between the medullary olive and the inferior cerebellar peduncle with the other components of CN IX. Note: These neurons do not form a distinct nucleus visible on cross-section of the brainstem. The position indicated on the diagram is representative of the location of the cell bodies of these fibers.

Intracranial course

Upon emerging from the lateral aspect of the medulla, the visceral motor fibers join the other components of CN IX to enter the jugular foramen. Within the jugular foramen, there are two glossopharyngeal ganglia that contain nerve cell bodies that mediate general, visceral, and special sensation. The visceral motor fibers pass through both ganglia without synapsing and exit the inferior ganglion with CN IX general sensory fibers as the tympanic nerve. Before exiting the jugular foramen, the tympanic nerve enters the petrous portion of the temporal bone and ascends via the inferior tympanic canaliculus to the tympanic cavity. Within the tympanic cavity the tympanic nerve forms a plexus on the surface of the promontory of the middle ear to provide general sensation. The visceral motor fibers pass through this plexus and merge to become the lesser petrosal nerve. The lesser petrosal nerve re-enters and travels through the temporal bone to emerge in the middle cranial fossa just lateral to the greater petrosal nerve. It then proceeds anteriorly to exit the skull via the foramen ovale along with the mandibular nerve component of CN V (V3).

Extra-cranial course and final innervations

Upon exiting the skull, the lesser petrosal nerve synapses in the otic ganglion, which is suspended from the mandibular nerve immediately below the foramen ovale. Postganglionic fibers from the otic ganglion travel with the auriculotemporal branch of CN V3 to enter the substance of the parotid gland.

Hypothalamic Influence

Fibers from the hypothalamus and olfactory system project via the dorsal longitudinal fasciculus to influence the output of the inferior salivatory nucleus. Examples include: 1) dry mouth in response to fear (mediated by the hypothalamus); 2) salivation in response to smelling food (mediated by the olfactory system)

=== Overview of visceral sensory component ===
This component of CN IX innervates the baroreceptors of the carotid sinus and chemoreceptors of the carotid body.

Peripheral and intracranial course.
Sensory fibers arise from the carotid sinus and carotid body at the common carotid artery bifurcation, ascend in the carotid sinus nerve, and join the other components of CN IX at the inferior glossopharyngeal ganglion. The cell bodies of these neurons reside in the inferior glossopharyngeal ganglion. The central processes of these neurons enter the skull via the jugular foramen.
Central course – visceral sensory component
Once inside the skull, the visceral sensory fibers enter the lateral medulla between the olive and the inferior cerebellar peduncle and descend in the solitary tract to synapse in the caudal solitary nucleus. From the solitary nucleus, connections are made with several areas in the reticular formation and hypothalamus to mediate cardiovascular and respiratory reflex responses to changes in blood pressure, and serum concentrations of CO2 and O2.

Clinical correlation The visceral sensory fibers of CN IX mediate the afferent limb of the pharyngeal reflex in which touching the back of the pharynx stimulates the patient to gag (i.e., the gag reflex). The efferent signal to the musculature of the pharynx is carried by the branchial motor fibers of the vagus nerve.

=== Overview of somatic sensory component ===
This component of CN IX carries general sensory information (pain, temperature, and touch) from the skin of the external ear, internal surface of the tympanic membrane, the walls of the upper pharynx, and the posterior one-third of the tongue, anterior surface of the epiglottis, vallecula.

Peripheral course
Sensory fibers from the skin of the external ear initially travel with the auricular branch of CN X, while those from the middle ear travel in the tympanic nerve as discussed above (CN IX visceral motor section). General sensory information from the upper pharynx and posterior one-third of the tongue travel via the pharyngeal branches of CN IX. These peripheral processes have their cell body in either the superior or inferior glossopharyngeal ganglion.
Central course
The central processes of the general sensory neurons exit the glossopharyngeal ganglia and pass through the jugular foramen to enter the brainstem at the level of the medulla. Upon entering the medulla these fibers descend in the spinal trigeminal tract and synapse in the caudal spinal nucleus of the trigeminal.

=== Overview of special sensory component ===
The special sensory component of CN IX provides taste sensation from the posterior one-third of the tongue.

Peripheral course
Special sensory fibers from the posterior one-third of the tongue travel via the pharyngeal branches of CN IX to the inferior glossopharyngeal ganglion where their cell bodies reside.
Central course – special sensory component
The central processes of these neurons exit the inferior ganglion and pass through the jugular foramen to enter the brainstem at the level of the rostral medulla between the olive and inferior cerebellar peduncle. Upon entering the medulla, these fibers ascend in the tractus solitarius and synapse in the gustatory part of nucleus solitarius. Taste fibers from CN VII and X also ascend and synapse here. Ascending secondary neurons originating in nucleus solitarius project bilaterally to the ventral posteromedial (VPM) nuclei of the thalamus via the central tegmental tract. Tertiary neurons from the thalamus project via the posterior limb of the internal capsule to the inferior one-third of the primary sensory cortex (the gustatory cortex of the parietal lobe).

=== Associated brainstem nuclei ===
- Solitary nucleus: taste from the posterior 1/3 of the tongue and information from carotid sinus baroreceptors and carotid body chemoreceptors
- Spinal nucleus of the trigeminal nerve: Somatic sensory fibers from the internal surface of the tympanic membrane, middle ear, upper part of the pharynx, soft palate and posterior 1/3 of the tongue
- Nucleus ambiguus: lower motor neurons for the stylopharyngeus muscle
- Inferior salivatory nucleus: preganglionic parasympathetic neurons to the otic ganglion and then to the parotid gland

== Functions ==
- It receives general somatic sensory fibers (ventral trigeminothalamic tract) from the tonsils, the pharynx, the middle ear and the posterior 1/3 of the tongue.
- It receives special visceral sensory fibers (taste) from the posterior 1/3 of the tongue.
- It receives visceral sensory fibers from the carotid bodies, carotid sinus.
- It supplies parasympathetic fibers to the parotid gland via the otic ganglion.
- It supplies motor fibers to stylopharyngeus muscle, the only motor component of this cranial nerve.
- It contributes to the pharyngeal plexus.

== Clinical significance ==
=== Damage ===
Damage to the glossopharyngeal nerve can result in loss of taste sensation to the posterior one third of the tongue, and impaired swallowing.

=== Examination ===
The clinical tests used to determine if the glossopharyngeal nerve has been damaged include testing the gag reflex of the mouth, asking the patient to swallow or cough, and evaluating for speech impediments. The clinician may also test the posterior one-third of the tongue with bitter and sour substances to evaluate for impairment of taste.

The integrity of the glossopharyngeal nerve may be evaluated by testing the patient's general sensation and that of taste on the posterior third of the tongue. The gag reflex can also be used to evaluate the glossopharyngeal nerve.

== Additional images ==
Inferior view of the human brain, with the cranial nerves labelled.

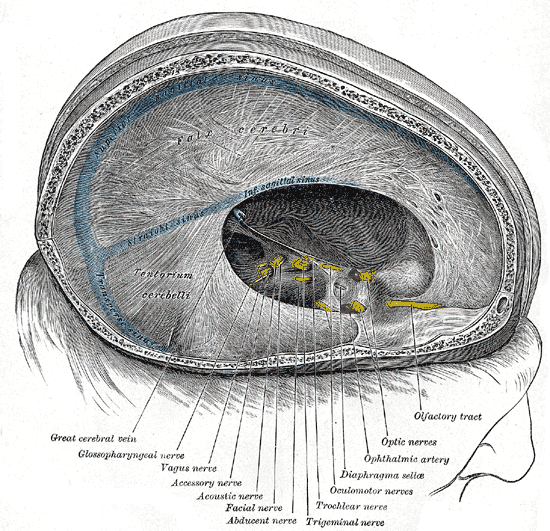
Dura mater and its processes exposed by removing part of the right half of the skull, and the brain.

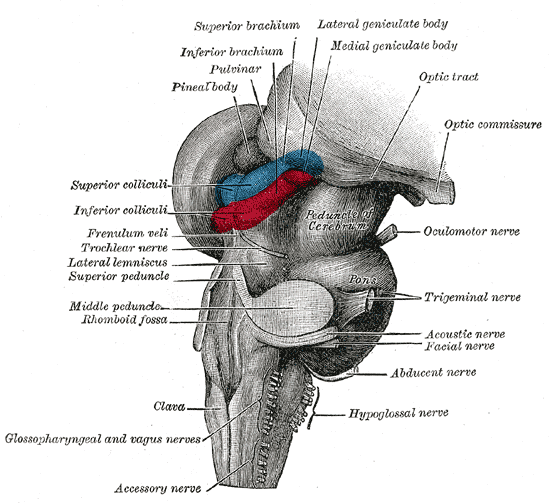
Hind- and mid-brains; postero-lateral view.(

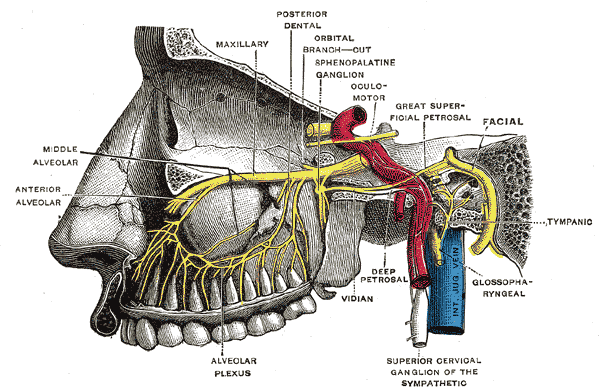
Alveolar branches of superior maxillary nerve and sphenopalatine ganglion.

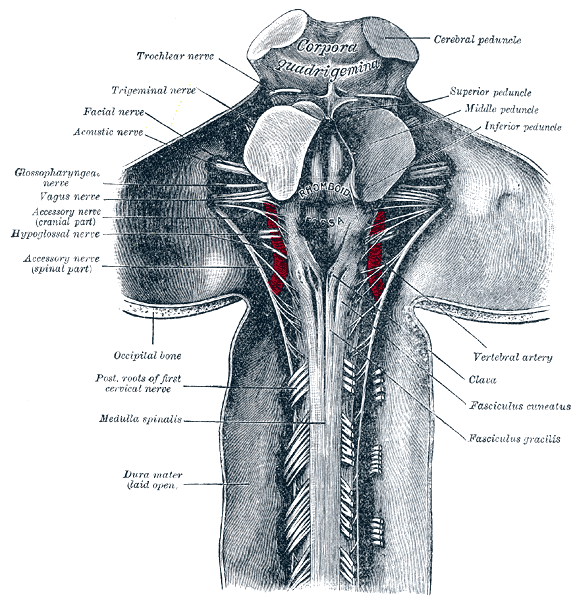
Upper part of medulla spinalis and hind- and mid-brains; posterior aspect, exposed in situ.

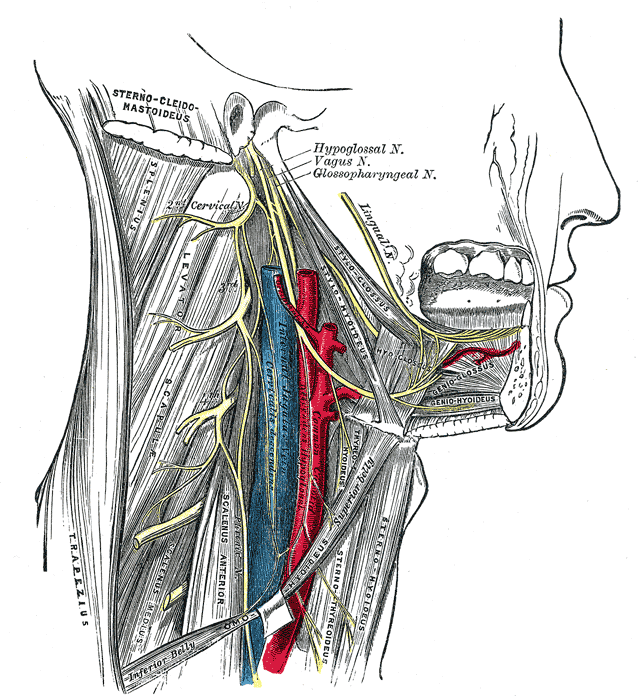
Hypoglossal nerve, cervical plexus, and their branches.
