= Tympanic plexus =

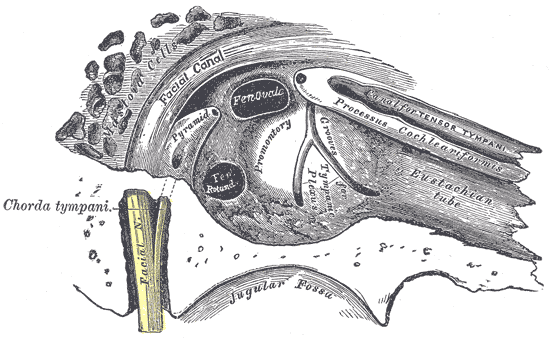
- View of the inner wall of the tympanum. (Grooves for tympanic plexus labeled at center.)

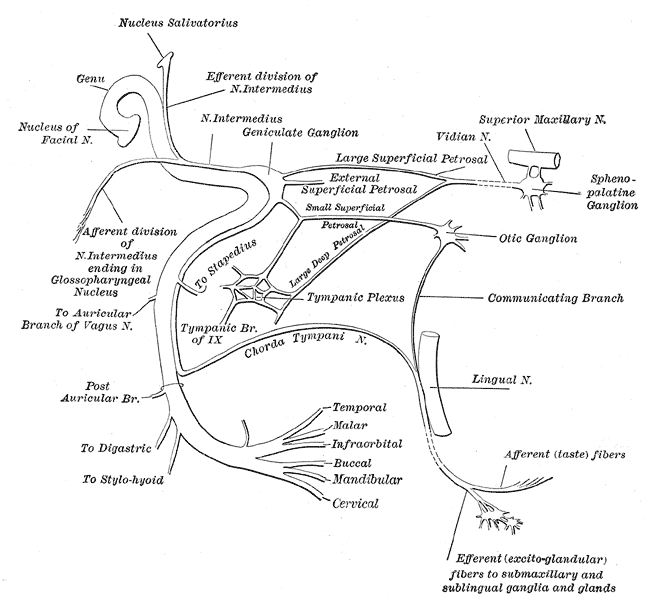
- Plan of the facial and intermediate nerves and their communication with other nerves. (Tympanic plexus labeled at center.)

Details
- From: Caroticotympanic nerves, tympanic nerve

Identifiers
- Latin: plexus tympanicus
- TA98: A14.2.01.140
- TA2: 6324
- FMA: 77533

The tympanic plexus is a nerve plexus within the tympanic cavity formed upon the promontory of tympanic cavity by the tympanic nerve (branch of the inferior ganglion of glossopharyngeal nerve (CN IX)), and the superior and inferior caroticotympanic nerves (post-ganglionic sympathetic branches of the internal carotid plexus).

The lesser petrosal nerve (which may be considered a continuation of the tympanic nerve) traverses the tympanic plexus.

== Anatomy ==
=== Distribution ===
The tympanic plexus innervates the mucosa of the tympanic cavity, pharyngotympanic tube, and mastoid air cell. It issues a branch to the greater petrosal nerve (through an opening anterior to the oval window).
