= Jugular foramen =

Opening in the base of the skull allowing many structures to pass

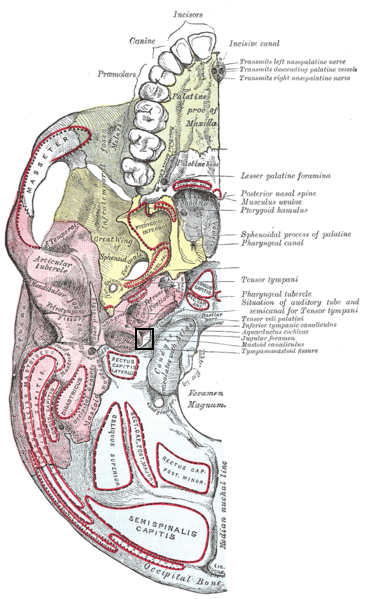
- Base of skull. Inferior surface. (label for jugular foramen is at right, third from the bottom)

Details
- Part of: Skull
- System: Skeletal system

Identifiers
- Latin: foramen jugulare
- MeSH: D000080869
- TA98: A02.1.00.054
- TA2: 458
- FMA: 56432

A jugular foramen is one of the two (left and right) large foramina (openings) in the base of the skull, located behind the carotid canal. It is formed by the temporal bone and the occipital bone. It allows many structures to pass, including the inferior petrosal sinus, three cranial nerves, the sigmoid sinus, and the posterior meningeal artery.

== Structure ==
The jugular foramen is formed in front by the petrous portion of the temporal bone, and behind by the occipital bone. It is generally slightly larger on the right side than on the left side.

=== Contents ===
The jugular foramen may be subdivided into three compartments, each with their own contents.

- The anterior compartment transmits the inferior petrosal sinus.
- The intermediate compartment transmits the glossopharyngeal nerve, the vagus nerve, and the accessory nerve.
- The posterior compartment transmits the sigmoid sinus (becoming the internal jugular vein), and some meningeal branches from the occipital artery and ascending pharyngeal artery.

An alternative imaging based subclassification exists, delineated by the jugular spine which is a bony ridge partially separating the jugular foramen into two parts:

- The smaller, anteromedial, "pars nervosa" compartment contains CN IX, (tympanic nerve, a branch of CN IX), and receives the venous return from inferior petrosal sinus.
- The larger, posterolateral, "pars vascularis" compartment contains CN X, CN XI, Arnold's nerve (or the auricular branch of CN X involved in the Arnold's reflex, where external auditory meatus stimulation causes cough), jugular bulb, and posterior meningeal branch of ascending pharyngeal artery.

== Clinical significance ==
Obstruction of the jugular foramen can result in jugular foramen syndrome.

== Additional images ==
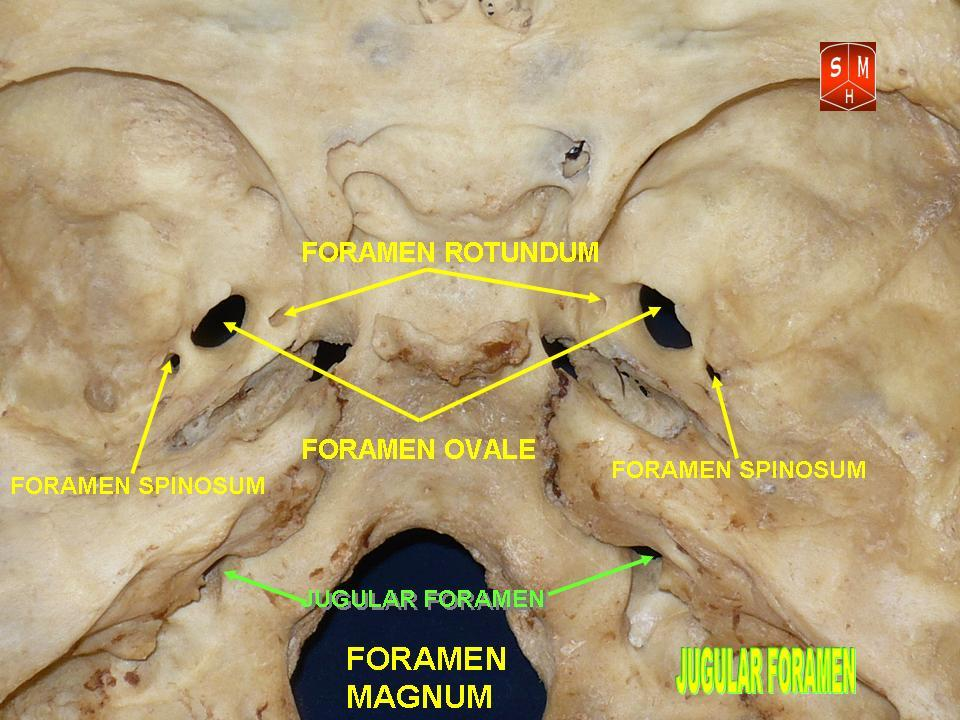
Jugular foramen

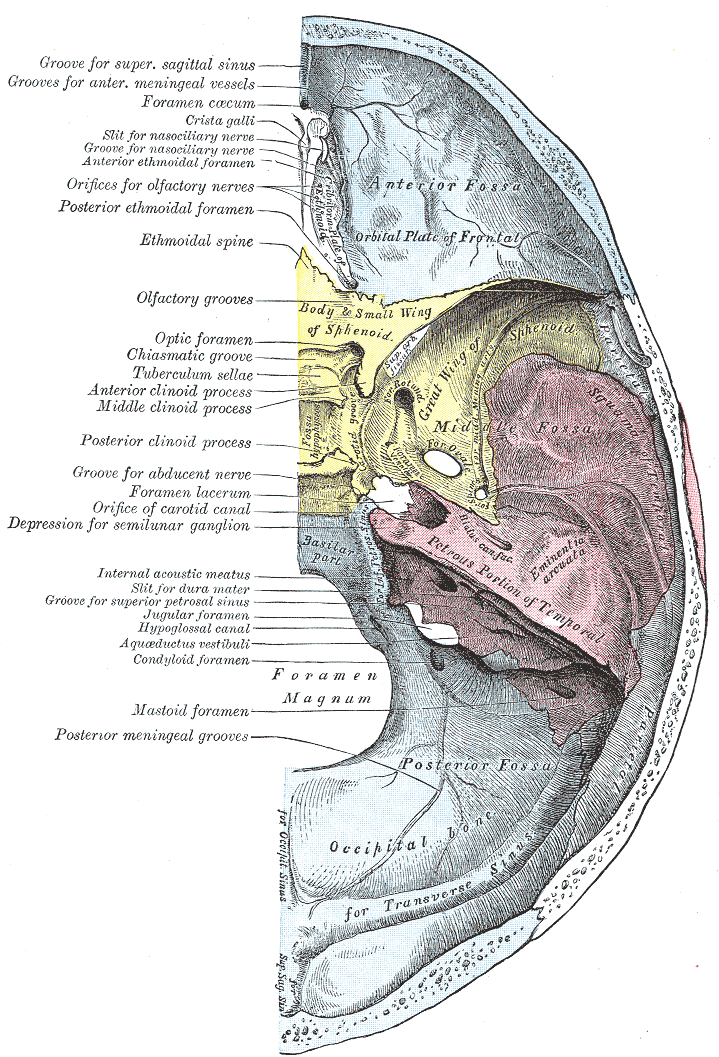
Base of the skull. Upper surface.

== See also ==
- Occipitomastoid suture
