= Outline of the human nervous system =

Overview of and topical guide to the human nervous system

The following diagram is provided as an overview of and topical guide to the human nervous system:

Human nervous system

The human nervous system is the part of the body that coordinates a person's voluntary and involuntary actions and transmits signals between different parts of the body. The human nervous system consists of two main parts: the central nervous system (CNS) and the peripheral nervous system (PNS). The CNS contains the brain and spinal cord. The PNS consists mainly of nerves, which are long fibers that connect the CNS to every other part of the body. The PNS includes motor neurons, mediating voluntary movement; the autonomic nervous system, comprising the sympathetic nervous system and the parasympathetic nervous system and regulating involuntary functions; and the enteric nervous system, a semi-independent part of the nervous system whose function is to control the gastrointestinal system.

== Anatomy ==
The following list of human anatomical structures is based on the Terminologia Anatomica, the international standard for anatomical nomenclature. While the order is standardized, the hierarchical relationships in the TA are somewhat vague, and thus are open to interpretation.

=== Central nervous system ===
- General terms
- Meninges
- Spinal cord
  - Gray columns
  - White substance
- Brain
  - Brainstem
  - Cerebellum
  - Diencephalon
  - Telencephalon
    - Cerebral hemisphere

=== Peripheral nervous system ===
- Cranial nerves
  - Olfactory nerve
  - Optic nerve
  - Oculomotor nerve
  - Trochlear nerve
  - Trigeminal nerve
    - Sensory root
      - Trigeminal ganglion
    - Ophthalmic nerve
      - Lacrimal nerve
      - Frontal nerve
        - Supra-orbital nerve
        - Supratrochlear nerve
      - Nasociliary nerve
      - Posterior ethmoidal nerve
      - Anterior ethmoidal nerve
        - External nasal nerve
      - Infratrochlear nerve
    - Maxillary nerve
      - Nasopalatine nerve
      - Pharyngeal nerve
      - Greater palatine nerve
      - Lesser palatine nerves
      - Superior alveolar nerves
      - Zygomatic nerve
      - Infra-orbital nerve
    - Mandibular nerve
      - Masseteric nerve
      - Deep temporal nerves
      - Buccal nerve
      - Auriculotemporal nerve
      - Lingual nerve
        - Chorda tympani
        - Sublingual nerve
        - Inferior alveolar nerve
          - Nerve to mylohyoid
        - Mental nerve
  - Abducent nerve
  - Facial nerve
    - Posterior auricular nerve
    - Intermediate nerve
      - Greater petrosal nerve
      - Chorda tympani (also in trigeminal? redundancy?)
  - Vestibulocochlear nerve
    - Vestibular nerve
    - Cochlear nerve
  - Glossopharyngeal nerve
    - Tympanic nerve
      - Tympanic plexus
    - Lesser petrosal nerve
  - Vagus nerve
    - Superior laryngeal nerve
    - Recurrent laryngeal nerve
  - Accessory nerve
  - Hypoglossal nerve
- Spinal nerves
  - Cervical nerves
    - Suboccipital nerve
    - Greater occipital nerve
    - Third occipital nerve
    - Cervical plexus
      - Ansa cervicalis
      - Lesser occipital nerve
      - Great auricular nerve
      - Transverse cervical nerve
      - Supraclavicular nerves
      - Phrenic nerve
    - Brachial plexus
      - Supraclavicular part
        - Dorsal scapular nerve
        - Long thoracic nerve
        - Subclavian nerve
        - Suprascapular nerve
        - Subscapular nerves
          - Lower subscapular nerve
          - Upper subscapular nerve
        - Thoracodorsal nerve
        - Medial pectoral nerve
        - Lateral pectoral nerve
      - Infraclavicular part
        - Musculocutaneous nerve
        - Medial cutaneous nerve of arm
        - Medial cutaneous nerve of forearm
        - Median nerve
        - Ulnar nerve
        - Radial nerve
        - Axillary nerve
  - Thoracic nerves
  - Lumbar nerves
    - Medial clunial nerves
  - Sacral nerves and coccygeal nerve
    - Lumbar plexus
      - Iliohypogastric nerve
      - Ilio-inguinal nerve
        - Anterior labial nerves
        - Anterior scrotal nerves
      - Genitofemoral nerve
      - Lateral cutaneous nerve of thigh
      - Obturator nerve
      - Accessory obturator nerve
      - Femoral nerve
        - Saphenous nerve
          - Medial cutaneous nerve of leg
      - Lumbosacral trunk
    - Sacral plexus
      - Nerve to obturator internus
      - Nerve to piriformis
      - Nerve to quadratus femoris
      - Superior gluteal nerve
      - Inferior gluteal nerve
      - Posterior cutaneous nerve of thigh
        - Inferior clunial nerves
      - Perforating cutaneous nerve
      - Pudendal nerve
        - Inferior anal nerves
        - Perineal nerves
          - Posterior labial nerves
          - Posterior scrotal nerves
          - Dorsal nerve of clitoris
          - Dorsal nerve of penis
      - Coccygeal nerve
        - Anococcygeal nerve
    - Sciatic nerve
      - Common fibular nerve
        - Lateral sural cutaneous nerve
        - Superficial fibular nerve
        - Deep fibular nerve
      - Tibial nerve
        - Interosseous nerve of leg
        - Medial sural cutaneous nerve
        - Sural nerve
        - Medial plantar nerve
        - Lateral plantar nerve

=== Autonomic nervous system ===
  - Sympathetic part
    - Sympathetic trunk
      - Rami communicantes
    - Superior cervical ganglion
    - Middle cervical ganglion
    - Cervicothoracic ganglion (Stellate - should prob. include inferior cerv. ganglion)
    - Thoracic ganglia
      - Greater splanchnic nerve
      - Lesser splanchnic nerve
      - Least splanchnic nerve
    - Lumbar ganglia
      - Lumbar splanchnic nerves
    - Sacral ganglia
      - Sacral splanchnic nerves
      - Ganglion impar
  - Parasympathetic part
    - Cranial part
      - Ciliary ganglion
        - Short ciliary nerves
      - Pterygopalatine ganglion
        - Nerve of pterygoid canal
      - Submandibular ganglion
      - Sublingual ganglion
      - Otic ganglion
    - Pelvic part
      - Pelvic ganglia
        - Parasympathetic root of pelvic ganglia = Pelvic splanchnic nerves
  - Peripheral autonomic plexuses and ganglia
    - Craniocervical part
      - Internal carotid plexus
    - Thoracic part
      - Cardiac plexus
      - Esophageal plexus
      - Pulmonary plexus
    - Abdominal part
      - Celiac plexus
      - Aorticorenal ganglia
      - Superior mesenteric plexus
      - Inferior mesenteric plexus
    - Pelvic part
      - Superior hypogastric plexus
      - Inferior hypogastric plexus

== Structures ==
=== Central nervous system ===
The central nervous system (CNS) is the largest part of the nervous system and includes the brain and spinal cord.

- Spinal cord

==== Brain ====
Brain – center of the nervous system.

- Outline of the human brain
- List of regions of the human brain

Principal regions of the vertebrate brain:

Brain	Forebrain	Telencephalon	Rhinencephalon, Amygdala, Hippocampus, Neocortex, Lateral ventricles, Basal ganglia
Brain	Forebrain	Diencephalon	Epithalamus, Thalamus, Hypothalamus, Subthalamus, Pituitary gland, Pineal gland
Brain	Midbrain		Tectum, Cerebral peduncle, Pretectum, Mesencephalic duct
Brain	Hindbrain	Metencephalon	Pons, Cerebellum,
Brain	Hindbrain	Myelencephalon	Medulla oblongata

=== Peripheral nervous system ===
Peripheral nervous system (PNS) – nervous system structures that do not lie within the CNS.

Peripheral nervous system	by direction	afferent system	
Peripheral nervous system	by direction	efferent system	
Peripheral nervous system	By function	Somatic	
Peripheral nervous system	By function	Autonomic	Sympathetic
Peripheral nervous system	By function	Autonomic	Parasympathetic
Peripheral nervous system	By function	Autonomic	Enteric

==== Sensory system ====
A sensory system is a part of the nervous system responsible for processing sensory information. A sensory system consists of sensory receptors, neural pathways, and parts of the brain involved in sensory perception.

- List of sensory systems
- Sensory neuron
- Perception
- Visual system
- Auditory system
- Somatosensory system
- Vestibular system
- Olfactory system
- Taste
- Pain

=== Components of the nervous system ===
- Neuron
- Interneuron
- Ganglion (PNS) vs Nucleus (neuroanatomy) (CNS) except basal ganglia (CNS)
- Nerve (PNS) vs Tract (neuroanatomy) (CNS)
- White matter (more myelinated) vs Grey matter

==== Glial cells ====
Glial cells, commonly called neuroglia or glia, are supportive cells that maintain homeostasis, form myelin, and provide support and protection for the brain's neurons.

- Microglia
- Astrocyte
- Oligodendrocyte (CNS) vs Schwann cell (PNS)

==== Neuron ====
Structure of a typical neuron

A neuron (also known as a neurone or nerve cell) is an excitable cell in the nervous system that processes and transmits information by electrochemical signaling. Neurons are the core components of the brain, spinal cord, and peripheral nerves.

- Soma
- Axon
- Myelin
- Dendrite
- Dendritic spine

==== Action potential ====
An action potential (or nerve impulse) is a transient alteration of the transmembrane voltage (or membrane potential) across the membrane in an excitable cell generated by the activity of voltage-gated ion channels embedded in the membrane. The best known action potentials are pulse-like waves that travel along the axons of neurons.

- Membrane potential
- Ion channel
- Voltage-gated ion channels

==== Synapse ====
Structure of a typical chemical synapse

Synapses are specialized junctions through which neurons signal to each other and to non-neuronal cells such as those in muscles or glands.

- Chemical synapse
- Gap junction
- Synaptic plasticity
- Long-term potentiation

==== Neurotransmitter ====
Neurotransmitter – endogenous chemical that relays, amplifies, and modulates signals between neurons and other cells to which they are synaptically connected.

- List of neurotransmitters
- Neuromodulator
- Monoamine neurotransmitter
- Neuropeptide

==== Neurotransmitter receptor ====
Neurotransmitter receptor – membrane receptor that can be activated by a neurotransmitter. Interactions between neurotransmitters and neurotransmitter receptors can evoke a wide range of differing responses from the cell receiving the signal, including excitation, inhibition, and various types of modulation.

== Evolution of the human nervous system ==
- Evolution of nervous systems
- Evolution of human intelligence
- Evolution of the human brain
- Paleoneurology

== Branches of science that study the human nervous system ==
- Neuroscience
  - Neurology
    - Paleoneurology
- Category:Receptors

== Biological neural network ==
Biological neural network – population of physically interconnected neurons that act cooperatively to form a functional circuit. Computer scientists and engineers also study artificial neural networks formed by simplified mathematical abstractions of the signaling properties of biological neurons.

- Central pattern generator
- Reflex arc
- Neural oscillations

== Neural development ==
Neural development – comprises the processes that generate, shape, and reshape the nervous system, from the earliest stages of embryogenesis to the final years of life.

- Neural plasticity
- Neurogenesis
- Neuroregeneration

=== Prenatal development of the nervous system ===
==== Neurogenesis ====
- General neural development
  - Neurulation
  - Neurula
  - Notochord
  - Neuroectoderm
  - Neural plate
    - Neural fold
    - Neural groove
  - Neuropoiesis
- Neural crest
  - Cranial neural crest
    - Cardiac neural crest complex
  - Truncal neural crest
- Neural tube
  - Rostral neuropore
  - Neuromere/Rhombomere
  - Cephalic flexure
  - Pontine flexure
  - Alar plate
    - sensory
  - Basal plate
    - motor
  - Glioblast
  - Neuroblast
  - Germinal matrix

==== Eye development ====
Eye development

- Neural tube: Optic vesicle
- Optic stalk
- Optic cup
- Surface ectoderm: Lens placode

==== Auditory development ====
- Otic placode
  - Otic pit
  - Otic vesicle

== Motor control ==
Motor control – comprises the activities carried out by the nervous system that organize the musculoskeletal system to create coordinated movements and skilled actions.

- Motor system
- Motor vortex
- cerebrum
- Basal ganglia
- Reflex

== Learning and memory ==
Memory – organism's ability to store, retain, and recall information. "Learning" means acquiring new knowledge, behaviors, skills, values, preferences or understanding, and may involve synthesizing different types of information.

- Amnesia
- Synaptic plasticity
- Classical conditioning
- Operant conditioning
- Imprinting (psychology)

== Cognition ==
Cognition – activities involved in processing information, applying knowledge, and changing preferences. Cognition, or cognitive processes, can be natural or artificial, conscious or unconscious.

- Mind
- Consciousness
- Neural correlates of consciousness
- Attention
- Emotion
- Intelligence
- Decision-making
- Executive function

== Arousal ==
Arousal – physiological and psychological state of being awake or reactive to stimuli.

- Sleep
- Anesthesia
- Coma
- Reticular formation

== See also ==
- List of regions in the human brain
- List of nerves of the human body
- Outline of human anatomy
- Outline of neuroscience
