= Pterygopalatine =

Pterygopalatine is used to refer to structures of the pterygoid processes of the sphenoid and the palatine bone. Specifically, it can refer to:

- Pterygopalatine fossa
- Palatovaginal canal (Greater palatine canal or Pterygopalatine canal)
- Pterygopalatine ganglion (also known as the Sphenopalatine ganglion)
