= Greater palatine =

Greater palatine may refer to:

- Greater palatine artery
- Greater palatine canal
- Greater palatine foramen
- Greater palatine nerve
