= Palatine nerves =

Group of nerves of the head

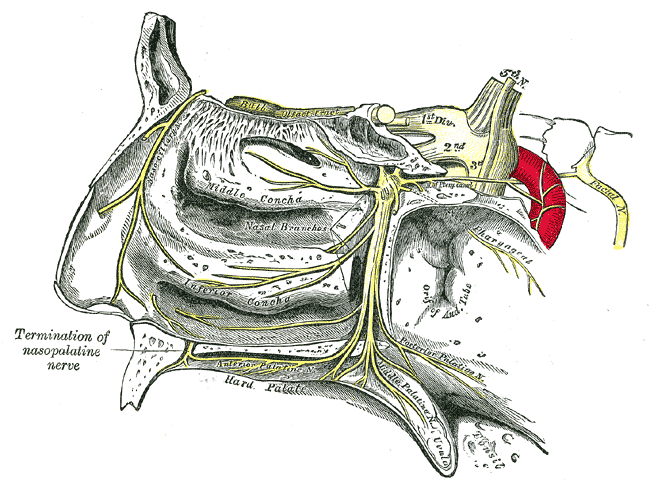
- The sphenopalatine ganglion and its branches. (Anterior palatine at bottom right, middle palatine at bottom center, and posterior palatine at bottom right.)

Details

Identifiers
- Latin: nervi palatini

The palatine nerves (descending branches) are distributed to the roof of the mouth, soft palate, tonsil, and lining membrane of the nasal cavity.

Most of their fibers are derived from the sphenopalatine branches of the maxillary nerve.

In older texts, they are usually categorized as three in number: anterior, middle, and posterior. (In newer texts, and in Terminologia anatomica, they are broken down into "greater palatine nerve" and "lesser palatine nerve".)
