= Palatine canal =

Palatine canal may refer to:

- Greater palatine canal
- Lesser palatine canals
