= Sphenopalatine =

Sphenopalatine may refer to:

- sphenopalatine artery, an artery of the head, commonly known as the artery of epistaxis
- sphenopalatine ganglion (or "pterygopalatine ganglion")
- sphenopalatine nerves
- sphenopalatine foramen, a foramen in the skull that connects the nasal cavity with the pterygopalatine fossa
