= Deep petrosal nerve =

Nerve in the cranial cavity

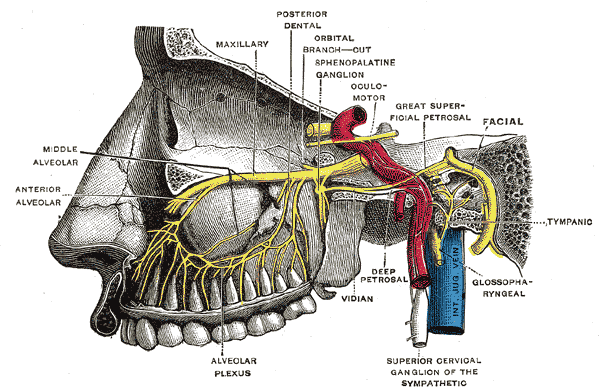
- Alveolar branches of superior maxillary nerve and sphenopalatine ganglion. (Deep petrosal labeled at bottom, center-right.)

Details
- From: Internal carotid plexus
- To: Nerve of pterygoid canal

Identifiers
- Latin: nervus petrosus profundus
- TA98: A14.3.02.008
- TA2: 6647
- FMA: 67549

The deep petrosal nerve is a post-ganglionic branch of the (sympathetic) internal carotid (nervous) plexus (which is in turn derived from the superior cervical ganglion, a part of the cervical sympathetic trunk) that enters the cranial cavity through the carotid canal. It then passes perpendicular to the carotid canal in the cartilaginous substance which fills the foramen lacerum to unite with the (parasympathetic) greater petrosal nerve (a branch of the facial nerve (CV VII)) to form the nerve of pterygoid canal (Vidian nerve). Through this connection it conveys sympathetic fibers through the pterygopalatine ganglion without synapsing. These post-ganglionic fibers are distributed to the nasal cavity, palate, and lacrimal gland via branches of the maxillary nerve. The deep petrosal nerve contributes to autonomic regulation of glandular secretion and vascular tone in regions of the nasal cavity and palate and is relevant in surgical approaches involving the pterygopalatine fossa.

== Anatomy ==
The path of the fibers from the spine to the lacrimal gland is as follows: intermediate grey column (of spinal cord at around the level of T1) → white rami communicantes (of cervical part of sympathetic chain) → superior cervical ganglion (synapse) → gray rami communicantes → internal carotid plexus → deep petrosal nerve → nerve of pterygoid canal → pterygopalatine ganglion (fibres pass through without synapsing) → zygomatic nerve → zygomaticotemporal nerve → lacrimal nerve.

=== Origin ===
The cell bodies of pre-ganglionic sympathetic axons that subsequently give synapse with neurons of the deep petrosal nerve reside in the intermediate grey column of the spinal cord at around the spinal level of T1. The pre-ganglionic axons ascend in the sympathetic trunk to synapse at the superior cervical ganglion where the cell bodies of the fibres of the deep petrosal nerve are situated. The post-ganglionic fibres do not synapse again and ultimately innervate their target tissues directly.

== Function ==
The deep petrosal nerve carries post-ganglionic sympathetic axons which are ultimately distributed to the blood vessels (to mediate vasoconstriction), and exocrine glands of the lacrimal gland, nasal cavity, and oral cavity (to mediate secretomotor function).

== Additional images ==
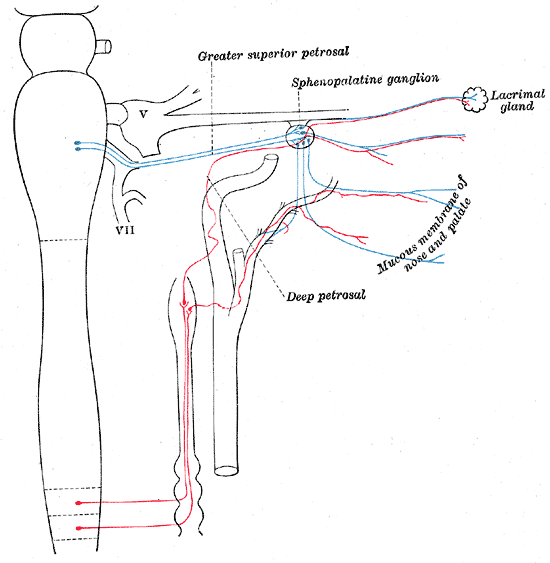
Sympathetic connections of the pterygopalatine and superior cervical ganglia.

Depicts nerve branches that are involved in the autonomic innervation of the lacrimal gland. The terminal parts of the pathway are variable between individuals and differ for the other glands of the deep face.
