= Greater petrosal nerve =

Nerve in the skull

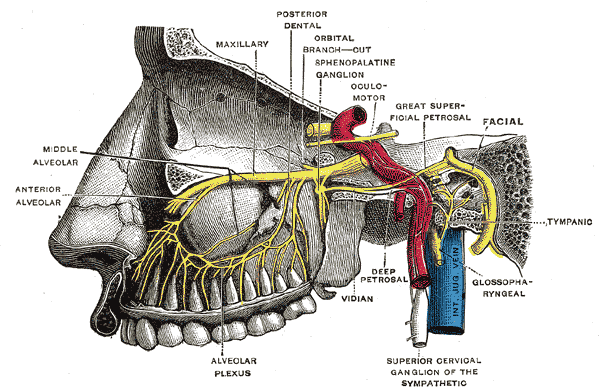
- Alveolar branches of superior maxillary nerve and sphenopalatine ganglion.

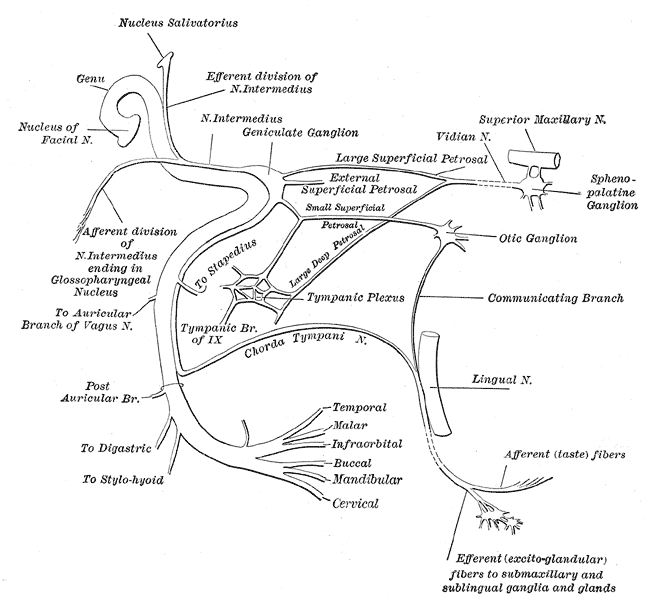
- Plan of the facial and intermediate nerves and their communication with other nerves.

Details
- From: Facial nerve
- To: Nerve of pterygoid canal
- Innervates: Parasympathetics to lacrimal glands

Identifiers
- Latin: nervus petrosus major
- TA98: A14.2.01.117
- TA2: 6289
- FMA: 53417

The greater petrosal nerve (or greater superficial petrosal nerve) is a nerve of the head mainly containing pre-ganglionic parasympathetic fibres which ultimately synapse in the pterygopalatine ganglion.

It branches from the facial nerve (CN VII) and is derived from the parasympathetic part of the nervus intermedius component of CN VII, with its cell bodies located in the superior salivary nucleus. In the connective tissue substance of the foramen lacerum, the greater petrosal nerve unites with the (sympathetic) deep petrosal nerve to form the nerve of the pterygoid canal (Vidian nerve) which proceeds to the pterygopalatine ganglion.

It forms part of a chain of nerves that provide secretomotor innervation to the lacrimal gland and mucosal glands of nasal cavity and palate.

== Structure ==
=== Origin ===
==== Parasympathetic component ====
Preganglionic parasympathetic fibres arise in the superior salivary nucleus of the pontine tegmentum. They join with general somatic sensory and special sensory fibres to form the nervus intermedius. The nervus intermedius exits the cranial cavity at the internal auditory meatus, and joins with the motor root of the facial nerve at the geniculate ganglion. While preganglionic parasympathetic fibres pass through the geniculate ganglion, they neither synapse, nor have their cell bodies located there.

Preganglionic parasympathetic fibres exit the geniculate ganglion as the greater petrosal nerve.

==== Gustatory sensory component ====
The greater petrosal nerve also conveys some special sensory nerve fibres which carry gustatory (taste) sensory information from the palate that are relayed to the pterygopalatine ganglion by the lesser palatine nerves and are in turn conveyed to the geniculate ganglion by the greater petrosal nerve to synapse in the ganglion.

=== Course ===
The greater petrosal nerve enters the petrous part of the temporal bone and travels anteromedially through it at a 45° angle. It emerges into the middle cranial fossa upon the anterosuperior surface of the bone through the hiatus for greater petrosal nerve alongside the petrosal branch of the middle meningeal artery.

In the middle cranial fossa, the nerve is situated between the two layers of the dura mater and passes obliquely anterior-ward along a groove upon the floor of the fossa - the groove for the greater petrosal nerve - that is situated upon the anterosuperior aspect of the petrous part of the temporal bone and anteromedial to the arcuate eminence, and adjacent and parallel to the lesser petrosal nerve and its own groove. The nerve passes deep to the trigeminal ganglion to reach the foramen lacerum.

At the foramen lacerum, it unites with the (sympathetic) deep petrosal nerve, forming the nerve of the pterygoid canal (which continues anterior-ward through the pterygoid canal to reach the pterygopalatine fossa and form the pterygopalatine ganglion).

== Clinical significance ==
During surgery of the middle cranial fossa, manipulation of the dura mater may damage the greater petrosal nerve, causing bleeding or swelling at the geniculate ganglion; this can compress the facial nerve and cause facial paralysis.

== Additional images ==
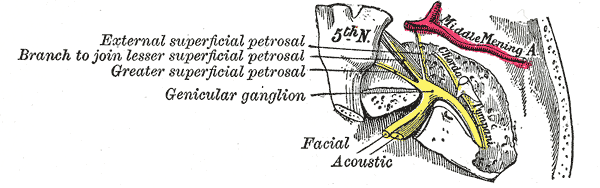
Course and connections of the facial nerve in the temporal bone.

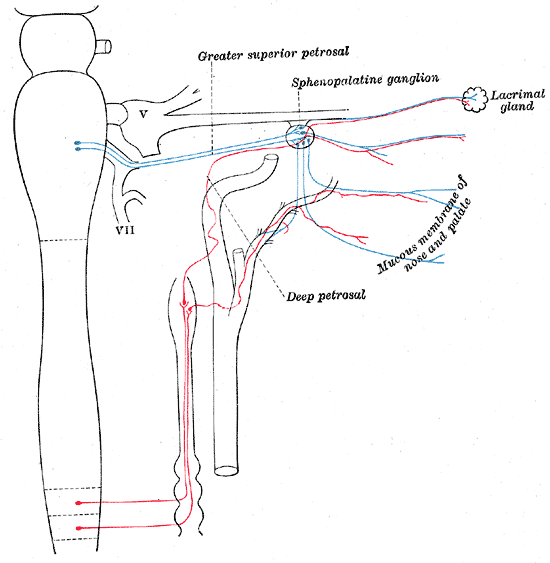
Sympathetic connections of the sphenopalatine and superior cervical ganglia.

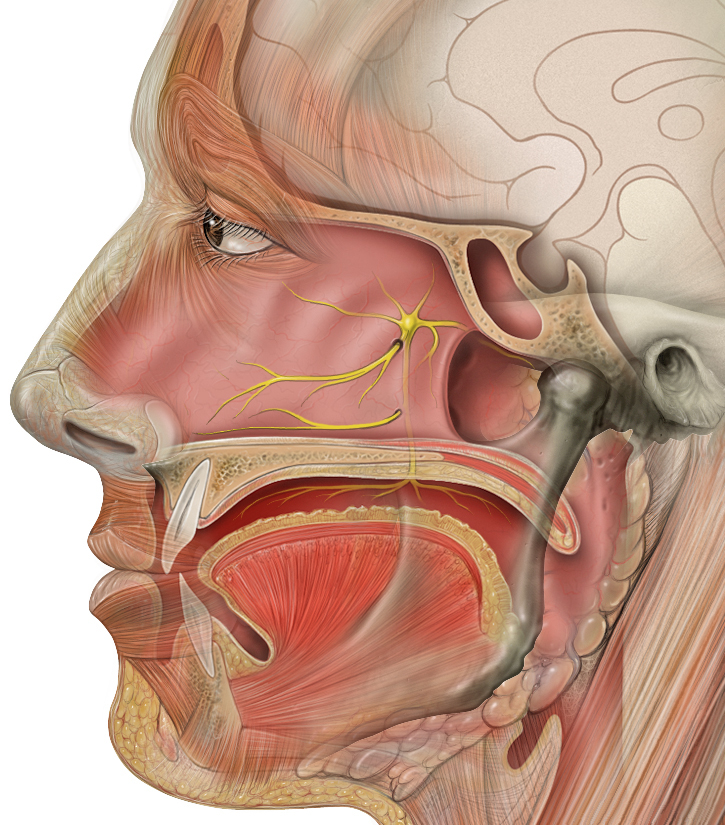
Head lateral gr petrosal nerve

Depicts nerve branches that are involved in the autonomic innervation of the lacrimal gland. The terminal parts of the pathway are variable between individuals and differ for the other glands of the deep face.
