= Outline of neuroscience =

Overview of and topical guide to neuroscience

The following outline is provided as an overview of and topical guide to neuroscience:

Neuroscience is the scientific study of the structure and function of the nervous system. It encompasses the branch of biology that deals with the anatomy, biochemistry, molecular biology, and physiology of neurons and neural circuits. It also encompasses cognition, and human behavior. Neuroscience has multiple concepts that each relate to learning abilities and memory functions. Additionally, the brain is able to transmit signals that cause conscious/unconscious behaviors that are responses verbal or non-verbal. This allows people to communicate with one another.

== Branches of neuroscience ==
=== Neurophysiology ===
Neurophysiology is the study of the function (as opposed to structure) of the nervous system.

- Brain mapping
- Electrophysiology
- Extracellular recording
- Intracellular recording
- Brain stimulation
- Electroencephalography
  - Intermittent rhythmic delta activity
- Category: Neurophysiology
- Category: Neuroendocrinology
- Neuroendocrinology

=== Neuroanatomy ===
Neuroanatomy is the study of the anatomy of nervous tissue and neural structures of the nervous system.

- Immunostaining
- Category: Neuroanatomy

=== Neuropharmacology ===
Neuropharmacology is the study of how drugs affect cellular function in the nervous system.

- Drug
- Psychoactive drug
- Anaesthetic
- Narcotic

=== Behavioral neuroscience ===
Behavioral neuroscience, also known as biological psychology, biopsychology, or psychobiology, is the application of the principles of biology to the study of mental processes and behavior in human and non-human animals.

- Neuroethology

=== Developmental neuroscience ===
Developmental neuroscience aims to describe the cellular basis of brain development and to address the underlying mechanisms. The field draws on both neuroscience and developmental biology to provide insight into the cellular and molecular mechanisms by which complex nervous systems develop.

- Human brain development timeline
- Development of the nervous system in humans
- Prenatal development - Cognitive development
- Aging and memory

(see also Child development - Mechanisms)

=== Cognitive neuroscience ===
Cognitive neuroscience is concerned with the scientific study of biological substrates underlying cognition, with a focus on the neural substrates of mental processes.

- Neurolinguistics
- Neuroimaging
- Functional magnetic resonance imaging
- Positron emission tomography

=== Systems neuroscience ===
Systems neuroscience is a subdiscipline of neuroscience which studies the function of neural circuits and systems. It is an umbrella term, encompassing a number of areas of study concerned with how nerve cells behave when connected together to form neural networks.

- Neural circuit
- Neural network (biology)
- Neural oscillation

=== Molecular neuroscience ===
Molecular neuroscience is a branch of neuroscience that examines the biology of the nervous system with molecular biology, molecular genetics, protein chemistry and related methodologies (ie. concerning neurotransmitters moving via physiology of synapses etc)

- Neurochemistry
- Nutritional neuroscience
- Neuropeptide

[ also see Neuropharmacology above]

=== Computational neuroscience ===
Computational neuroscience includes both the study of the information processing functions of the nervous system, and the use of digital computers to study the nervous system. It is an interdisciplinary science that links the diverse fields of neuroscience, cognitive science and psychology, electrical engineering, computer science, physics and mathematics.

- Neural network
- Neuroinformatic
- Neuroengineering
- Brain–computer interface
- Mathematical neuroscience

=== Neurophilosophy ===
Neurophilosophy or "philosophy of neuroscience" is the interdisciplinary study of neuroscience and philosophy. Work in this field is often separated into two distinct approaches. The first approach attempts to solve problems in philosophy of mind with empirical information from the neurosciences. The second approach attempts to clarify neuroscientific results using the conceptual rigor and methods of philosophy of science.

- Philosophy of mind
- Neuroethics
- Neuroscience of free will

=== Neurology ===
Neurology is the medical specialty dealing with disorders of the nervous system. It deals with the diagnosis and treatment of all categories of disease involving the central, peripheral, and autonomic nervous systems.

- Stroke
- Parkinson's disease
- Alzheimer's disease
- Huntington's disease
- Multiple sclerosis
- Amyotrophic lateral sclerosis
- Rabies
- Schizophrenia
- Epilepsy
- Hydrocephalus
  - Brain damage
- Traumatic brain injury
- Closed head injury
- Coma
- Paralysis
- Level of consciousness
- Neurosurgery

=== Neuropsychology ===
Neuropsychology studies the structure and function of the brain related to psychological processes and behaviors. The term is used most frequently with reference to studies of the effects of brain damage in humans and animals.

- Agraphia
- Agnosia
- Alexia
- Amnesia
- Anosognosia
- Aphasia
- Apraxia
- Dementia
- Dyslexia
- Hemispatial neglect
- Neurobiological effects of physical exercise

=== Neuroevolution and neuroeconomics ===
- Evolution of nervous systems
- Neuroevolution

== History of neuroscience ==
- History of neuroscience
- Neuron doctrine
- Category: History of neuroscience
- Cephalocentric hypothesis

== Nervous system ==
Outline of the human nervous system

- Action potential
- Acetylcholinesterase
- Central nervous system (CNS)
  - Brain
- Dendrite
- Glial cells
- List of regions in the human brain
- Nervous system
- Neurite
- Neuron
- Neuroplasticity
  - Synaptic plasticity
    - Long-term potentiation
- Neurotransmitter
  - Acetylcholine
  - Dopamine
- Synapse

== Persons influential in the field of neuroscience ==
- List of neuroscientists
- Category: Neuroscientists

== Related sciences ==
- Genetics
- Neurochemistry
- Cognitive science
- Psychology
- Molecular biology
- Psychiatry
- Neurosurgery
- Linguistics
- Developmental biology
- Biotechnology
- Neurophilosophy

== See also ==
- Fundamentals of Neuroscience at Wikiversity
