= Pterygopalatine canal =

Pterygopalatine canal may refer to:

- Greater palatine canal
- Palatovaginal canal
