= Spheno-maxillary fossa =

Space between bones of the human eye socket

The spheno-maxillary fossa is a small triangular space situated at the angle of the junction of the sphenomaxillary fissure and the pterygomaxillary fissure beneath the apex of the orbit. It is formed above by the under surface of the body of the sphenoid and by the orbital process of the palate bone.
