= Inferior posterior nasal branches of greater palatine nerve =

Nerves in the nasal cavity

Details
- From: greater palatine nerve

Identifiers
- Latin: rami nasales posteriores inferiores nervi palatini majoris
- TA98: A14.2.01.046
- TA2: 6225
- FMA: 52823

The Inferior posterior nasal branches of greater palatine nerve are small nerves which largely supply the posterior aspect of the nasal cavity. They pass through small foramina in the palatine canal to supply the lateral walls of the nasal cavity - including the superior, middle, and inferior nasal concha. These nerves run alongside the lateral posterior nasal arteries, which are branches of the sphenopalatine artery.

Note that superior posterior branches of the greater palatine nerve are responsible for innervating the posterosuperior aspect of the lateral nasal cavity. As well as this, they carry sensory and parasympathetic fibers.
