= Pterygopalatine fossa =

Fossa in the skull

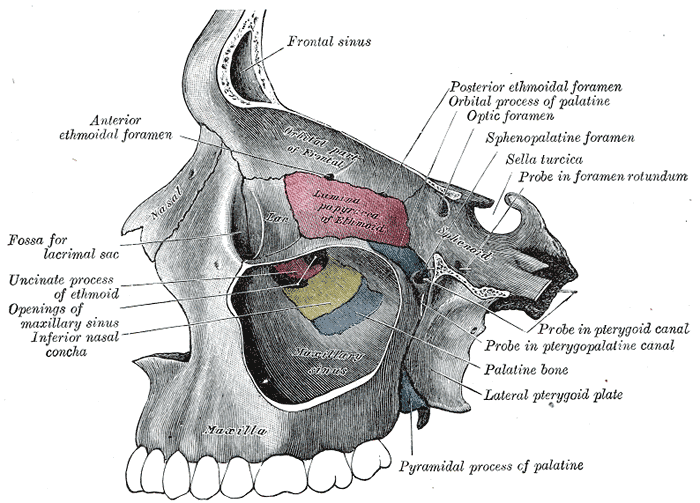
- Left maxillary sinus opened from the exterior.

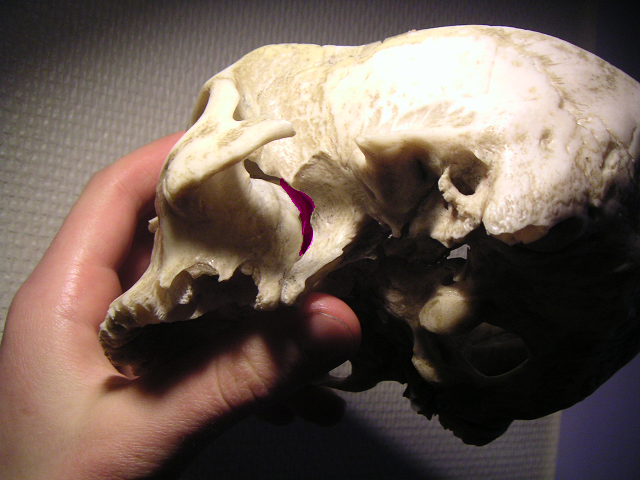
- Human skull with entrance to pterygopalatine fossa marked in red

Details

Identifiers
- Latin: fossa pterygopalatina
- MeSH: D056739
- TA98: A02.1.00.025
- TA2: 429
- FMA: 75309

In human anatomy, the pterygopalatine fossa (sphenopalatine fossa) is a fossa in the skull. A human skull contains two pterygopalatine fossae—one on the left side, and another on the right side. Each fossa is a cone-shaped paired depression deep to the infratemporal fossa and posterior to the maxilla on each side of the skull, located between the pterygoid process and the maxillary tuberosity close to the apex of the orbit. It is the indented area medial to the pterygomaxillary fissure leading into the sphenopalatine foramen. It communicates with the nasal and oral cavities, infratemporal fossa, orbit, pharynx, and middle cranial fossa through eight foramina.

== Structure ==
=== Boundaries ===
It has the following boundaries:

- anterior: superomedial part of the infratemporal surface of maxilla
- posterior: root of the pterygoid process and adjoining anterior surface of the greater wing of sphenoid bone
- medial: perpendicular plate of the palatine bone and its orbital and sphenoidal processes
- lateral: pterygomaxillary fissure
- inferior: part of the floor is formed by the pyramidal process of the palatine bone.

=== Passages ===
The following passages connect the fossa with other parts of the skull:

Direction	Passage	Connection
Posteriorly	foramen rotundum	middle cranial fossa
Posteriorly	pterygoid canal (Vidian)	middle cranial fossa, foramen lacerum
Posteriorly	palatovaginal canal (pharyngeal)	nasal cavity/nasopharynx
Anteriorly	inferior orbital fissure	orbit
Medially	sphenopalatine foramen	nasal cavity
Laterally	pterygomaxillary fissure	infratemporal fossa
Inferiorly	greater palatine canal (pterygopalatine)	oral cavity, lesser palatine canals

== Functions ==
The pterygopalatine fossa contains

- the pterygopalatine ganglion suspended by nerve roots from the maxillary nerve
- the terminal third of the maxillary artery
- the maxillary nerve (CN V_{2}, the second division of the trigeminal nerve), with which is the nerve of the pterygoid canal, a combination of the greater petrosal nerve (preganglionic parasympathetic) and the deep petrosal nerve (postganglionic sympathetic). To obtain block anesthesia of the entire second division of the trigeminal nerve, an intraoral injection can be administered into this area.

== See also ==
- Pterygopalatine canal (disambiguation)
- Fossa in the Human Body

== Additional images ==
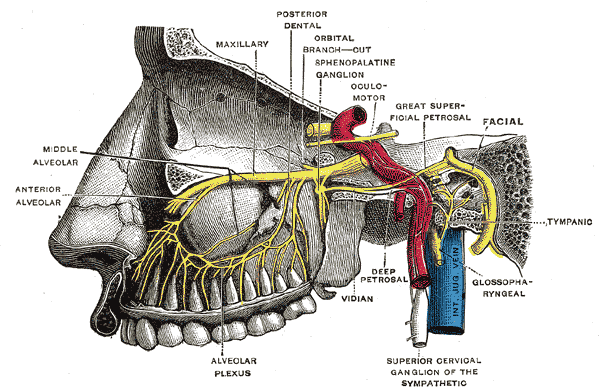
Alveolar branches of superior maxillary nerve and pterygopalatine ganglion

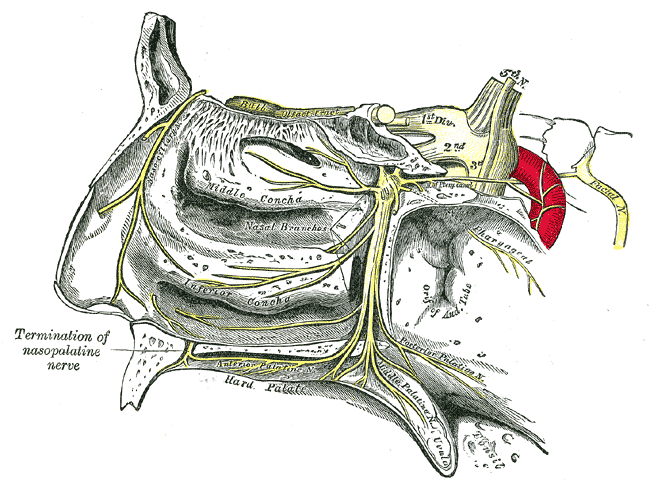
The pterygopalatine ganglion and its branches

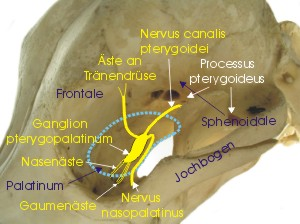
Pterygopalatine fossa in a dog

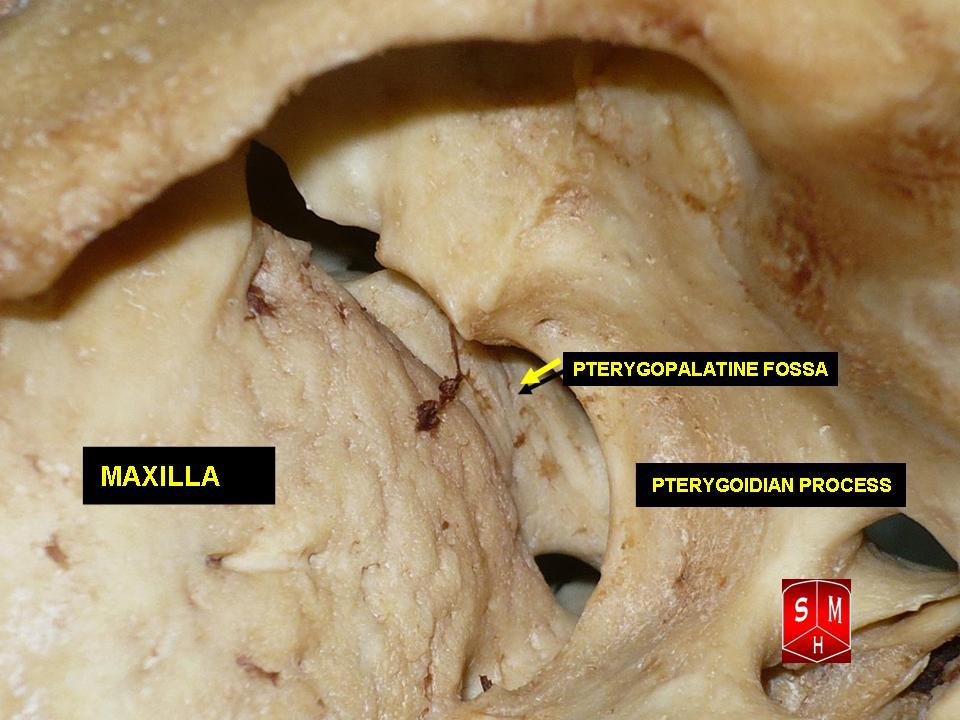
Pterygopalatine fossa
