= Trigeminal cave =

Dura mater pouch

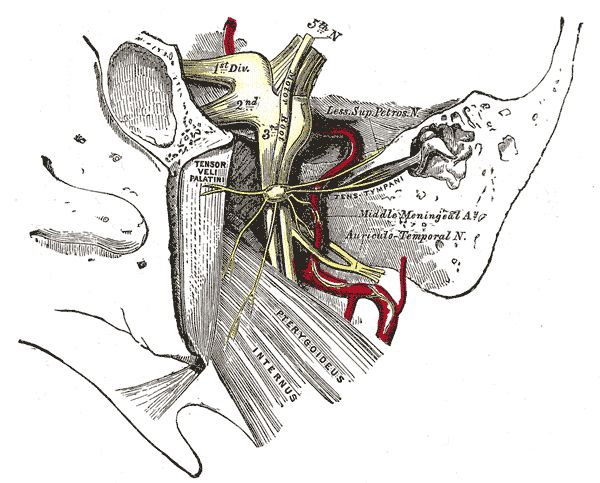
- The trigeminal ganglion and its branches represented here as 1st division, 2nd division, and 3rd division. The trigeminal cave houses this ganglion.

Details

Identifiers
- Latin: cavum Meckeli, cavum trigeminale
- TA98: A14.1.01.108
- TA2: 5379

The trigeminal cave (also known as Meckel's cave or cavum trigeminale) is a pouch of dura mater containing cerebrospinal fluid.

== Structure ==
The trigeminal cave is formed by the two layers of dura mater (endosteal and meningeal) which are part of an evagination of the cerebellar tentorium near the apex of the petrous part of the temporal bone. It envelops the trigeminal ganglion. It is bounded by the dura overlying four structures:

1. cerebellar tentorium superolaterally
2. lateral wall of the cavernous sinus superomedially
3. clivus medially
4. posterior petrous face inferolaterally

Within the dural confines of the trigeminal cave, there is a continuation of subarachnoid space along the posterior aspect of the cave, representing a continuation of the cerebral basal cisterns.

== History ==
=== Etymology ===
It is named for Johann Friedrich Meckel, the Elder.
