= Artery of the pterygoid canal =

- Plan of branches of the maxillary artery (artery of the pterygoid canal visible at upper right)

Details
- Precursor: Aortic arch 1
- Source: Maxillary artery

Identifiers
- Latin: arteria canalis pterygoidei
- TA98: A12.2.05.082; A12.2.06.006
- TA2: 4454
- FMA: 85528

The artery of the pterygoid canal (or Vidian artery) is an artery in the pterygoid canal, in the head.

It usually arises from the external carotid artery, but can arise from either the internal or external carotid artery or serve as an anastomosis between the two.

The eponym, Vidian artery, is derived from the Italian surgeon and anatomist Vidus Vidius.

== From external carotid artery ==
In this case; the artery passes backward along the pterygoid canal with the corresponding nerve. It is distributed to the upper part of the pharynx and to the auditory tube, sending into the tympanic cavity a small branch which anastomoses with the other tympanic arteries.

It can end in the oropharynx.

== From internal carotid artery ==
In this case; the artery passes inferiorly through foramen lacerum towards the oropharynx, with its main trunk continuing anteriorly through the pterygoid canal to anastomose with the pterygopalatine part of the maxillary artery. The artery is small and inconstant, passing through the pterygoid canal in an opposite direction to its corresponding nerve.

== See also ==
- Nerve of pterygoid canal
