= Carotid canal =

Passage in the skull's temporal bone

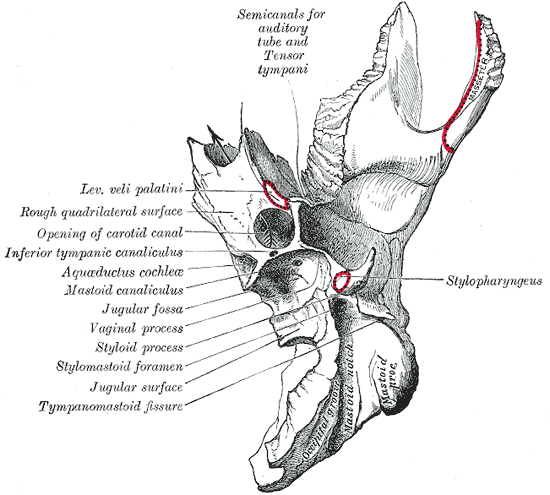
- Left temporal bone. Inferior surface. ("Opening of carotid canal" labeled at center left.)

Details
- Part of: Temporal bone
- System: Skeletal

Identifiers
- Latin: canalis caroticus
- TA98: A02.1.06.013
- TA2: 651
- FMA: 55805

The carotid canal is a passage in the petrous part of the temporal bone of the skull through which the internal carotid artery and its internal carotid (nervous) plexus pass from the neck into (the middle cranial fossa of) the cranial cavity.

Observing the trajectory of the canal from exterior to interior, the canal is initially directed vertically before curving anteromedially to reach its internal opening.

== Anatomy ==
The carotid canal has two openings, namely internal and external openings.

It is divided in three parts, namely, ascending petrous, transverse petrous, and ascending cavernous parts.

=== Boundaries ===
The carotid canal opens into the middle cranial fossa, at the petrous part of the temporal bone. Anteriorly, it is limited by posterior margin of the greater wing of sphenoid bone. Posteromedially, it is limited by basilar part of occipital bone.

=== Relations ===
The external opening of carotid canal (Latin: "apertura externa canalis carotici") is located upon the inferior aspect of the petrous part of the temporal bone. It is situated anterior to the jugular fossa (the two being separated by a ridge upon which the tympanic canaliculus opens inferiorly), and posterolateral to the foramen lacerum.

The internal opening of carotid canal (Latin: "apertura interna canalis carotici") opens into the middle cranial fossa at the apex of petrous part of temporal bone. It is situated lateral to foramen lacerum.

Both internal and external openings of the carotid canal lie anterior to the jugular foramen (which opens into the posterior cranial fossa).

The carotid canal is separated from middle ear and inner ear by a thin plate of bone.

=== Contents ===
The canal transmits internal carotid artery together with its associated nervous plexus and venous plexus.

== Clinical significance ==
Any skull fractures that damage the carotid canal can put the internal carotid artery at risk. Angiography can be used to ensure that there is no damage, and to aid in treatment if there is.

== Other animals ==
The carotid canal starts on the inferior surface of the temporal bone of the skull at the external opening of the carotid canal (also referred to as the carotid foramen). The canal ascends at first superiorly, and then, making a bend, runs anteromedially. Its internal opening is near the foramen lacerum, above which the internal carotid artery passes on its way anteriorly to the cavernous sinus.

The carotid canal allows the internal carotid artery to pass into the cranium, as well as the carotid plexus traveling on the artery.

The carotid plexus contains sympathetics to the head from the superior cervical ganglion. They have several motor functions: raise the eyelid (superior tarsal muscle), dilate pupil (pupillary dilator muscle), innervate sweat glands of face and scalp and constricts blood vessels in the head.

== Additional images ==
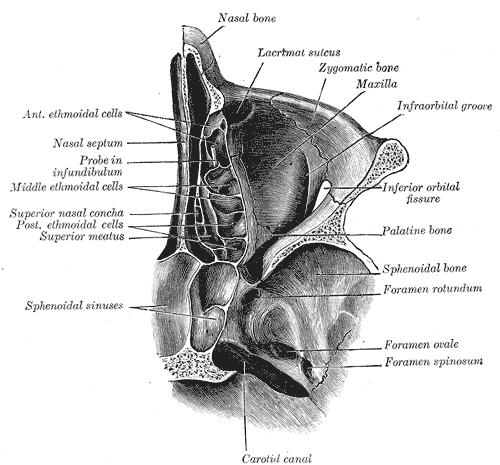
Horizontal section of nasal and orbital cavities.

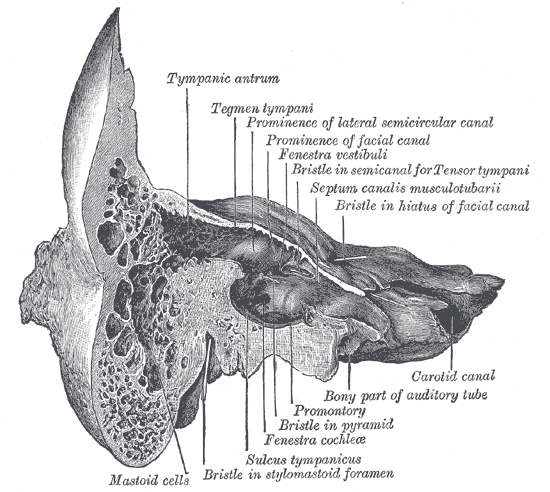
Coronal section of right temporal bone.

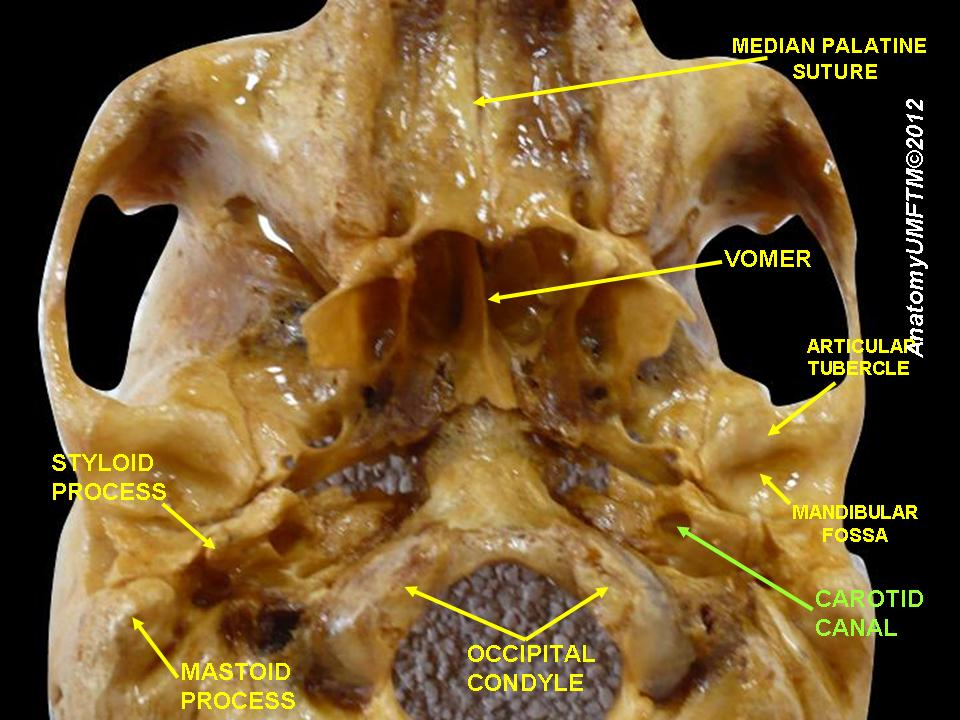
Carotid canal.
