= Trigeminal ganglion =

Sensory ganglion of the trigeminal nerve

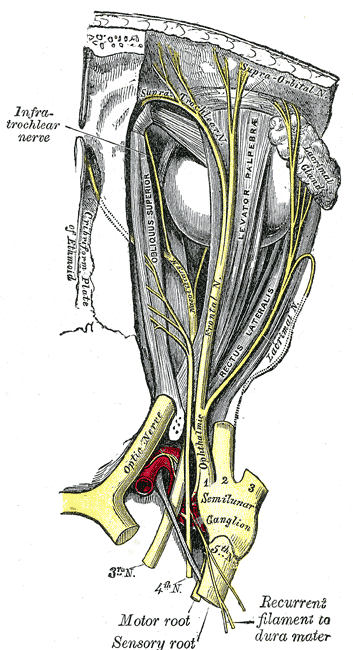
- Nerves of the orbit. Seen from above. (Trigeminal ganglion, labeled Semilunar Ganglion, visible near bottom.)

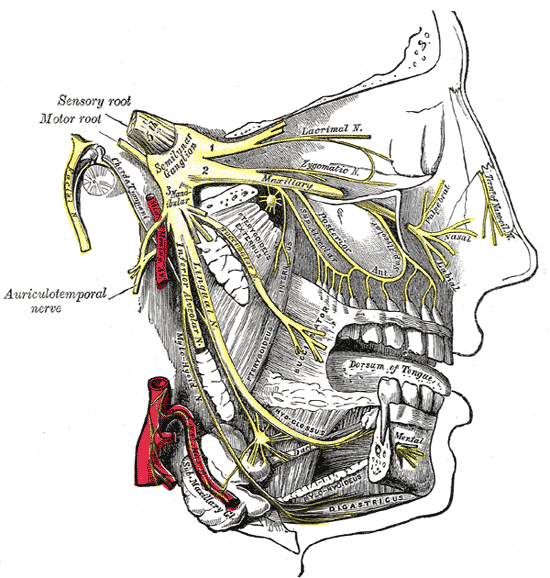
- Distribution of the maxillary and mandibular nerves, and the submaxillary ganglion. (Trigeminal ganglion, labeled Semilunar Ganglion, visible in upper left.)

Details

Identifiers
- Latin: ganglion trigeminale, ganglion semilunare (Gasseri)
- MeSH: D012668
- TA98: A14.2.01.014
- TA2: 6194
- FMA: 52618

The trigeminal ganglion (also known as: Gasserian ganglion, semilunar ganglion, or Gasser's ganglion) is the sensory ganglion of each trigeminal nerve (CN V). The trigeminal ganglion is located within the trigeminal cave (Meckel's cave), a cavity formed by dura mater.

== Anatomy ==
The trigeminal ganglion contains cell bodies of the pseudo-unipolar sensory neurons of the trigeminal nerve which extend their axons both distally/peripherally into the three divisions of the trigeminal nerve on the one end, and proximally/centrally to the brainstem on the other end; the trigeminal root extends from the trigeminal ganglion to the ventrolateral aspect of the pons.

The trigeminal ganglion is situated within the trigeminal cave (or Meckel's cave), a cerebrospinal fluid-filled cavity formed by a double layer of dura mater overlying the trigeminal impression near the apex of the petrous part of the temporal bone.

=== Structure ===
The trigeminal ganglion is somewhat crescent-shaped, with its convexity directed anterolaterally. From its convex border arise the ophthalmic nerve (V_{1}), maxillary nerve (V_{2}), and mandibular nerve (V_{3}).

The ganglion receives, on its medial side, filaments from the carotid plexus of the sympathetic. It issues minute branches to the tentorium cerebelli, and the dura mater in the middle cranial fossa.

=== Relations ===
Medially to the trigeminal ganglion are the internal carotid artery, and the posterior part of the cavernous sinus.

The motor root of the trigeminal nerve passes beneath the trigeminal ganglion to exit the skull through the foramen ovale. The greater petrosal nerve passes underneath the trigeminal ganglion to reach the foramen lacerum.

== Clinical significance ==
=== Herpes virus dormancy ===
After recovery from a primary herpes infection, the virus is not cleared from the body, but rather lies dormant in a non-replicating state within the trigeminal ganglion.

=== Lesions ===
If the trigeminal ganglion is damaged, by infection or surgery, it gives rise to the trigeminal trophic syndrome, which involves paresthesias and anesthesia, and may lead to erosions of the nasal ala.

=== Ablation in trigeminal neuralgia ===
The thermocoagulation or injection of glycerol into the trigeminal ganglion has been used in the treatment of trigeminal neuralgia.

== Other animals ==
=== Rodents ===
In rodents, the trigeminal ganglion is important as it is the first part of the pathway from the whiskers to the brain. Cell bodies of the whisker primary afferents are found here. These afferents are mechanoreceptor cells that fire in response to whisker deflection.

There are around 26,000–43,000 cell bodies in rodent trigeminal ganglion. It is possible that there are two distinct (or perhaps continuous) populations of cells having slowly and rapidly adapting responses to stimuli.

It is found at the base of the skull and projects to trigeminal brain stem areas including principalis, spinal trigeminal nucleus, interpolaris, and caudalis.

== Additional images ==
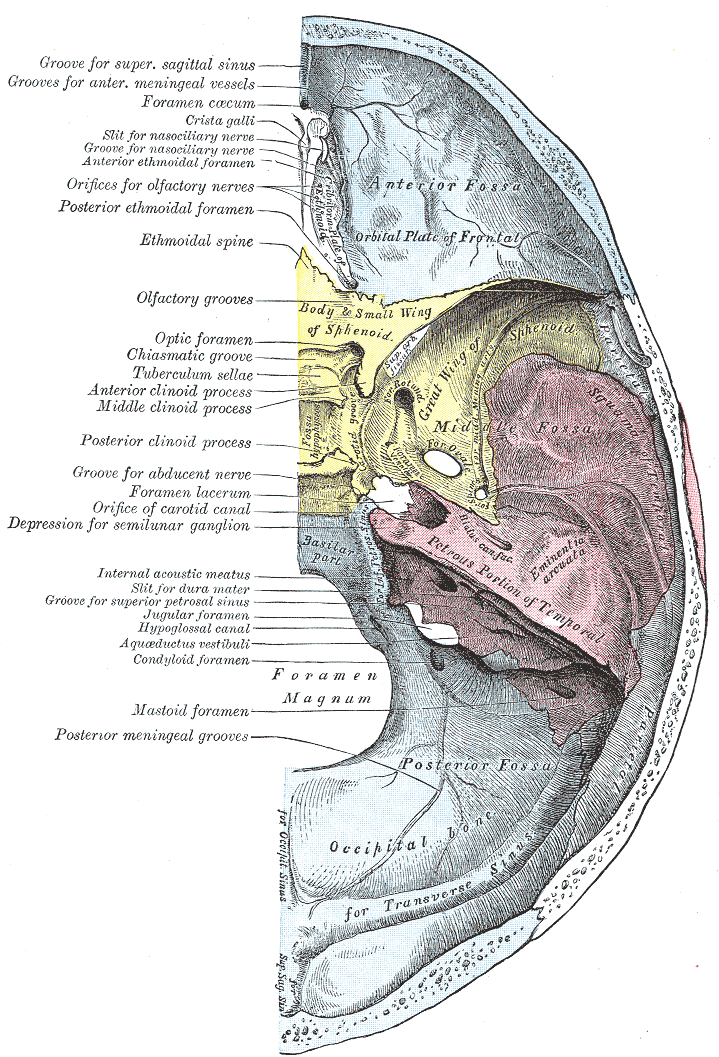
Base of the skull. Upper surface.

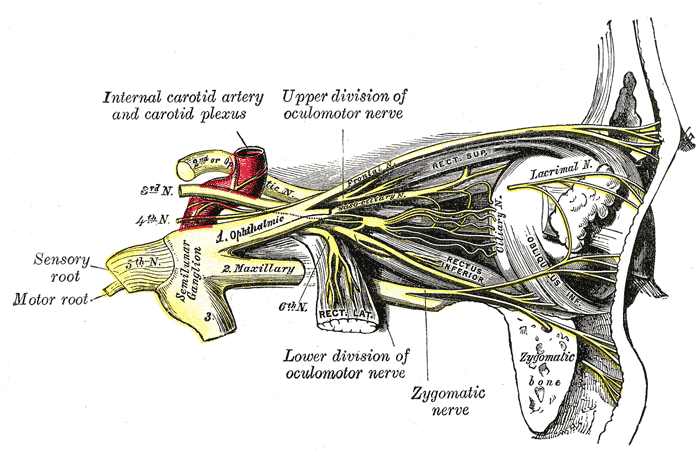
Nerves of the orbit, and the ciliary ganglion. Side view.

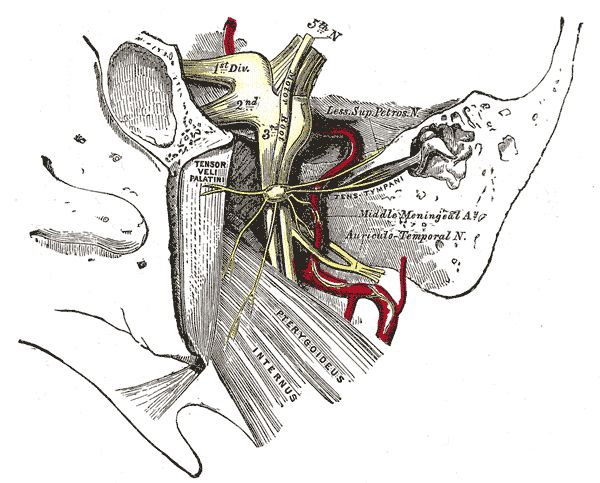
The otic ganglion and its branches.

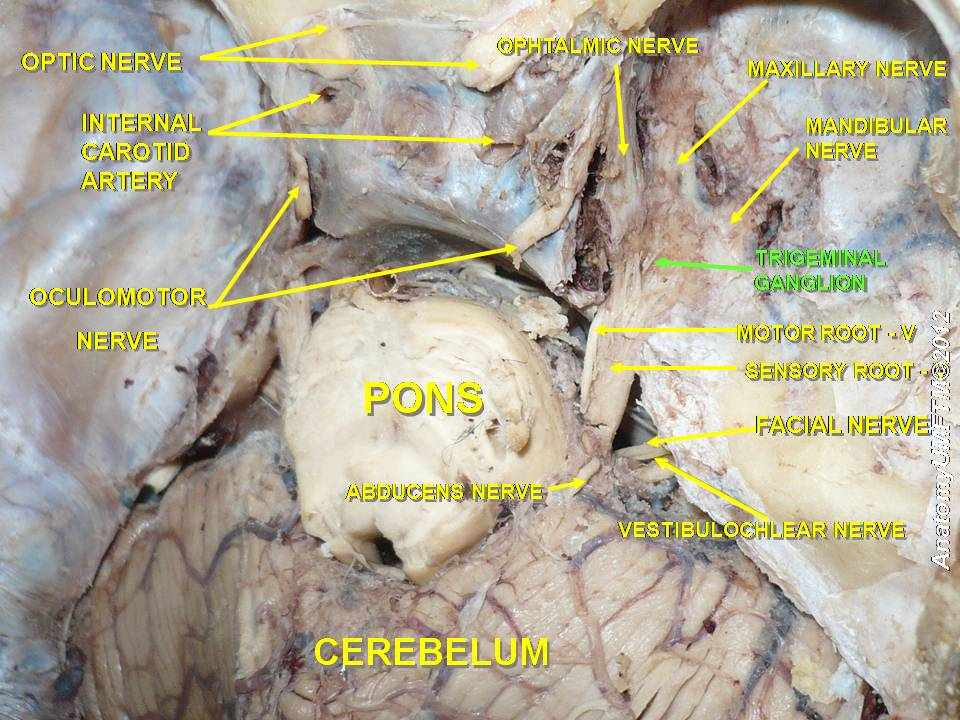
Trigeminal ganglion

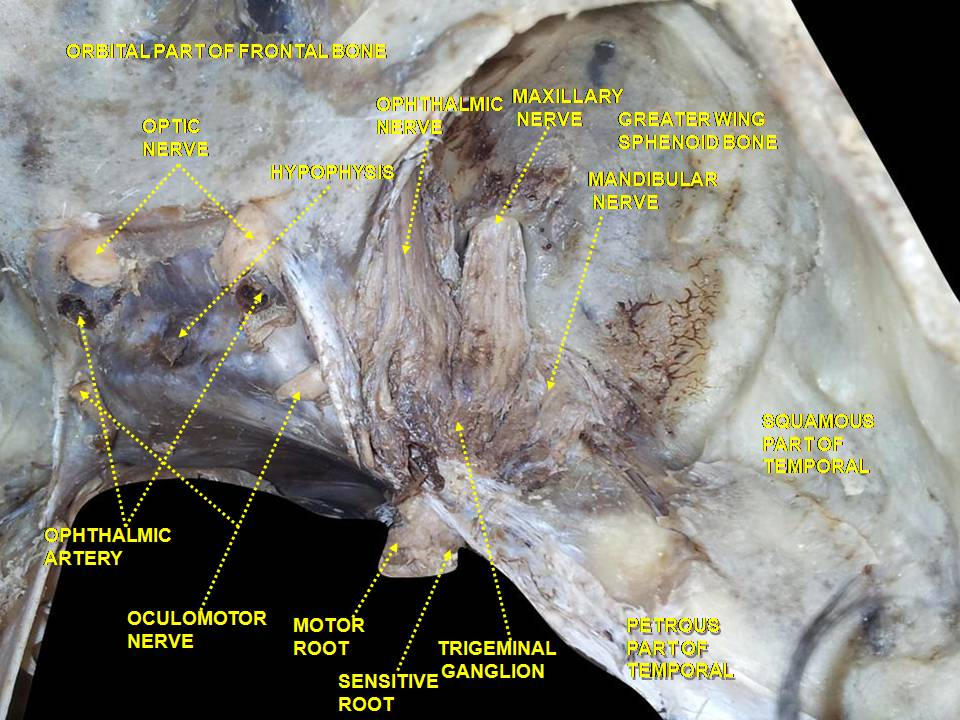
Trigeminal ganglion. Deep dissection. Superior view.
