= Arcuate eminence =

Subarcuate fossa
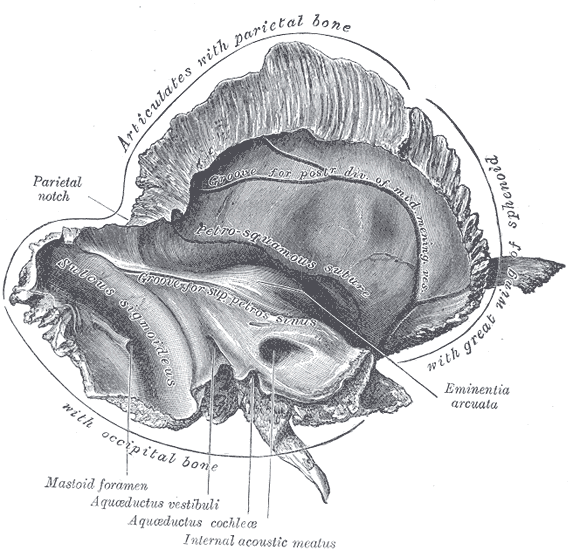

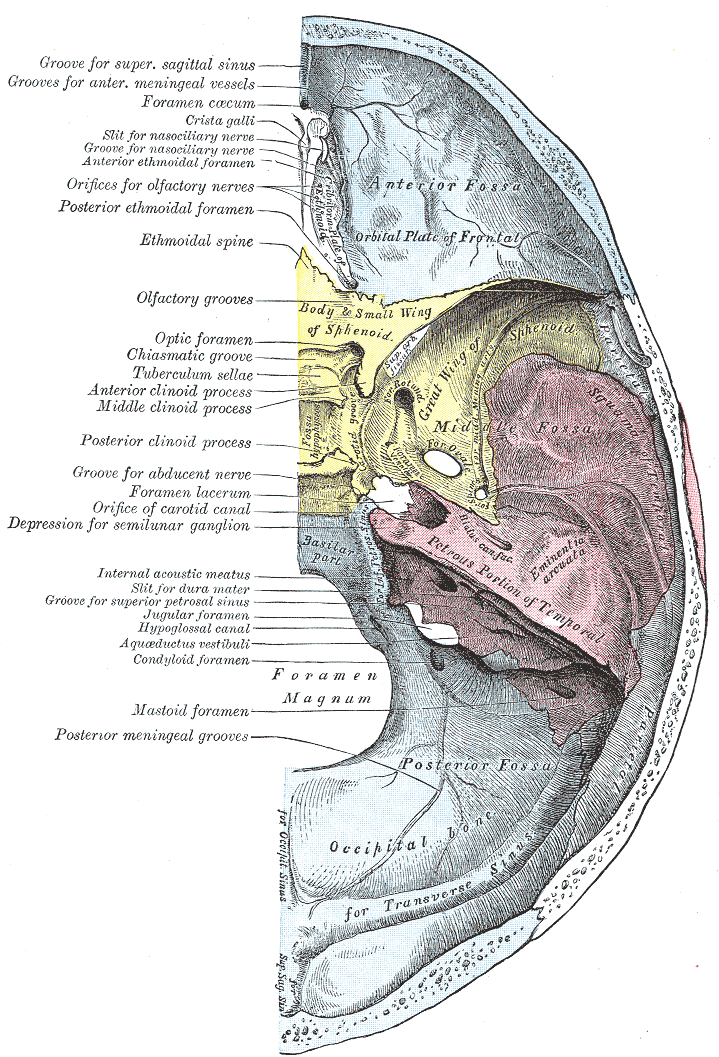

Details

Identifiers
- Latin: eminentia arcuata, jugum petrosum
- TA98: A02.1.06.023
- TA2: 661
- FMA: 55966

The arcuate eminence is a rounded prominence upon the superior surface of the petrous part of the temporal bone forming the lateral part of the posterior wall of the middle cranial fossa. The arcuate eminence indicates the position of the underlying superior semicircular canal (anterior semicircular canal).

The groove for the greater petrosal nerve is situated anteromedially to the arcuate eminence.
