= Internal carotid venous plexus =

Details

Identifiers
- Latin: plexus venosus caroticus internus
- FMA: 50797

The internal carotid venous plexus is a network of veins surrounding the internal carotid artery as it passes through the carotid canal. The plexus interconnects the internal jugular vein (extracranially) and cavernous sinus (intracranially).
