= Pterygoid canal =

Passage in the human skull

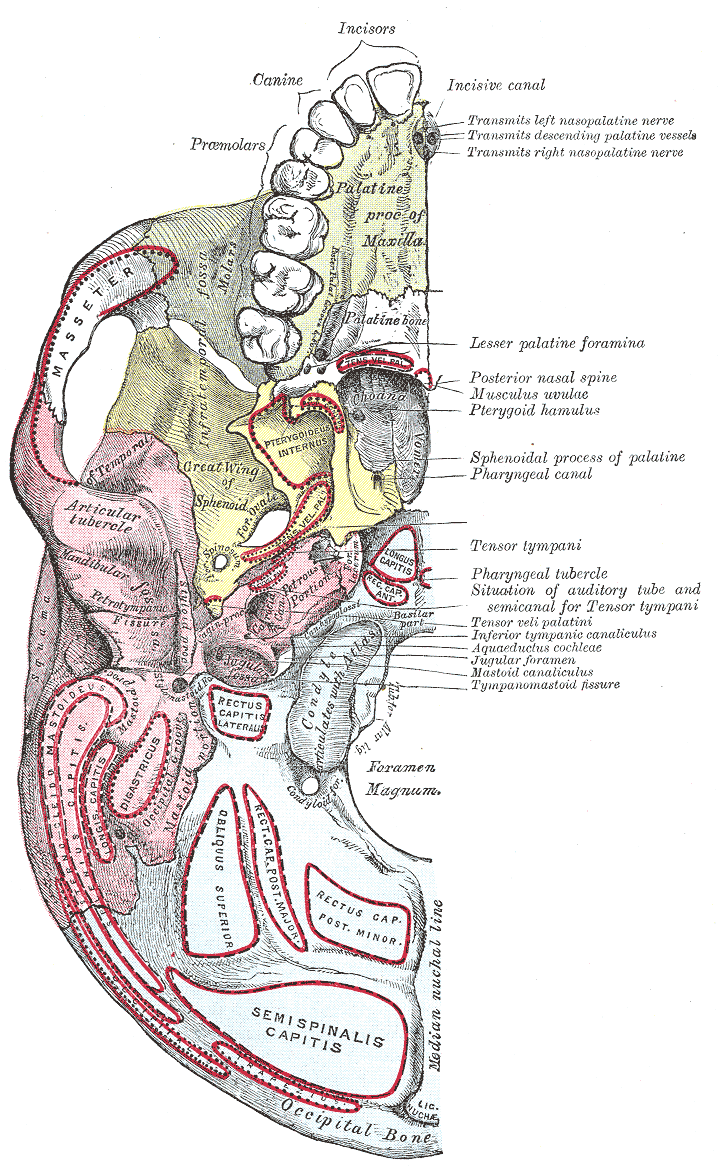
- Base of skull. Inferior surface. (Sphenoid is yellow.)

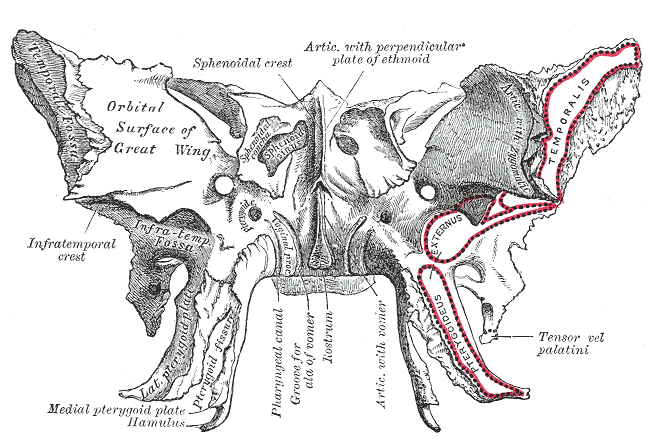
- Sphenoid bone. Anterior and inferior surfaces. (Pterygoid c. labeled at center left.)

Details
- Artery: Artery of the pterygoid canal
- Nerve: Nerve of pterygoid canal

Identifiers
- Latin: canalis pterygoideus
- TA98: A02.1.05.053
- TA2: 639
- FMA: 54756

The pterygoid canal (also vidian canal) is a passage in the sphenoid bone of the skull leading from just anterior to the foramen lacerum in the middle cranial fossa to the pterygopalatine fossa.

It transmits the nerve of pterygoid canal (Vidian nerve), the artery of the pterygoid canal (Vidian artery), and the vein of the pterygoid canal (Vidian vein).

== Structure ==
The pterygoid canal runs through the medial pterygoid plate of the sphenoid bone to the back wall of the pterygopalatine fossa.

== Additional images ==
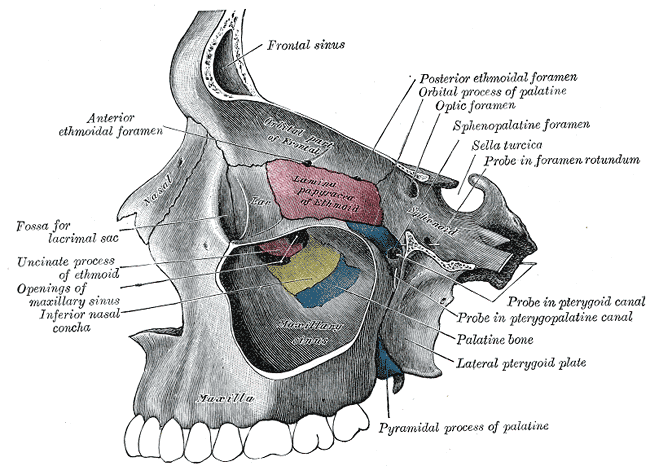
Medial wall of left orbit
