= Vidus Vidius =

Italian surgeon and anatomist

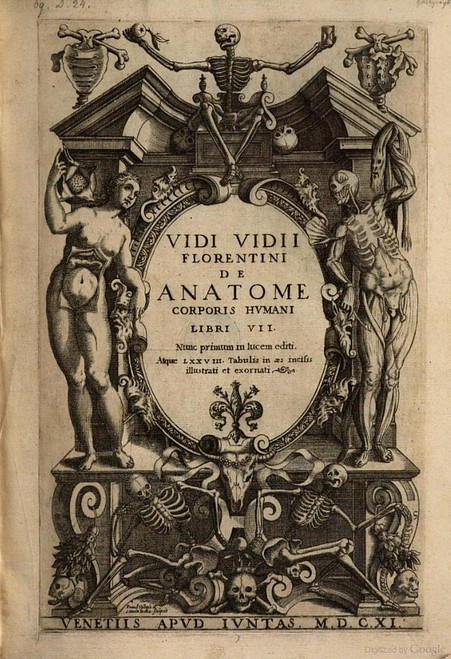
De anatome corporis humani libri VII

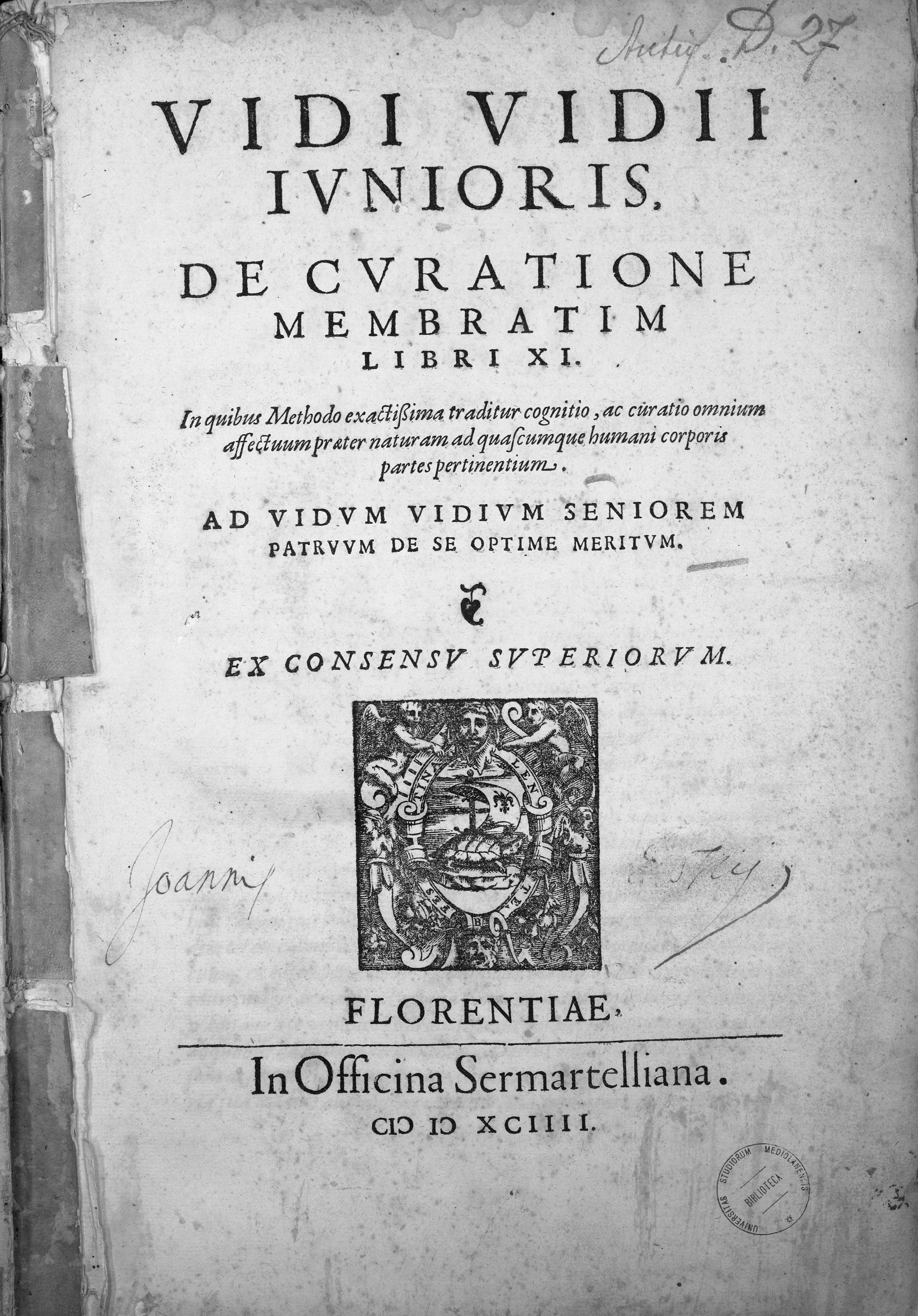
De curatione membratim libri, 1594

Guido Guidi (Latinized name Vidus Vidius) (10 February 1509 – 26 May 1569), was an Italian surgeon, anatomist and translator.

== Biography ==
His father was a physician and his mother was the daughter of the painter Domenico Ghirlandajo.

After practicing at Florence and Rome, he was invited by Francis I of France to come to Paris to be his personal doctor and teach at the Collège de France. While in Paris, Guidi befriended artist Benvenuto Cellini and published a book on surgery titled: Chirurgia, in 1544. This book was one of the best illustrated at the time and was based on works of Hippocrates, Galen, and Oribasius.

In 1547, Guidi returned to Italy to become the personal physician of Cosimo di Medici and teach at Pisa. He took holy orders and was ennobled. A book on medicine, incomplete at his death in 1569, was finished by his nephew as Ars Medicinalis between 1596 and 1611.

Today, the Vidian nerve in the skull and the Vidian artery are named after him.

== Works ==
- Chirurgia è graeco in latinum conuersa, Vido Vidio Florentino interprete cum nonnullis ejusdem Vidii cõmentarijs (Surgery, a translation from Greek to Latin by Guido Guidi, with commentaries by the translator), Paris, 1544 Digitization by Gallica
- De anatome corporis humani libri VII (The anatomy of the human body. In seven books), Venice, 1611 Digitization by the University of Iowa

== Bibliography ==
- Brief biography
