= Lesser palatine foramina =

Hole in the human palate

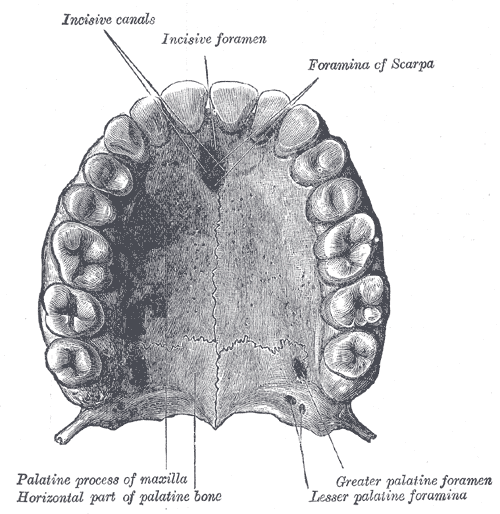
- Permanent teeth of upper dental arch, seen from below. (Lesser palatine foramina labeled at bottom right.)

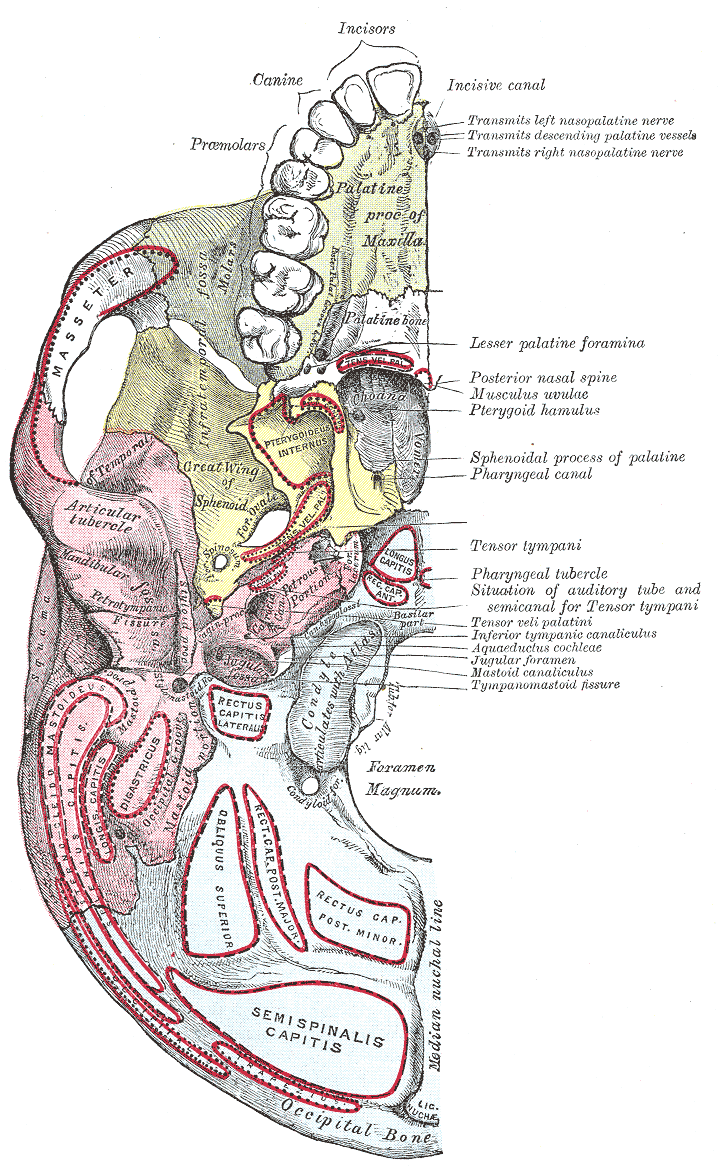
- Base of skull. Inferior surface. (Lesser palatine foramina visible near top.)

Details

Identifiers
- Latin: foramina palatina minora
- TA98: A02.1.00.059; A02.1.13.016
- TA2: 814
- FMA: 53167

The lesser palatine foramina are a pair of foramina (openings) on each of the palatine bones, which form the posterior roof of the human mouth. They are sometimes referred to as the minor palatine foramina. The lesser palatine foramina form a passage through the bone for the lesser palatine nerves and the lesser palatine arteries so that they may reach the soft palate from above. They are positioned posterior to the greater palatine foramen, in the pyramidal process of the palatine bone.
