= Brain stimulation =

Brain stimulation may refer to:

- Brain Stimulation (journal), a medical journal published by Elsevier
- Brain stimulation reward, a process of directly stimulating reward centers in the brain
- Cranial electrotherapy stimulation
- Deep brain stimulation, a surgical treatment that stimulates parts of the brain with electrical impulses
- Electrical brain stimulation, direct or indirect stimulation of the brain with electricity for therapeutic or research purposes
- Low field magnetic stimulation
- RNS System, a deep brain stimulation treatment for epilepsy patients
- Transcranial alternating current stimulation, delivering an oscillatory current over the occipital cortex
- Transcranial direct current stimulation, the direct application of weak dc electrical currents to neurons
- Transcranial magnetic stimulation, the stimulation of the brain by inducing magnetic fields
- Vagus nerve stimulation, a medical treatment that involves electrical stimulation of the vagus, or tenth cranial nerve
- Wirehead (science fiction), an electronic brain implant to stimulate the pleasure centers of the brain
