= Pterygopalatine nerves =

Two nerves that descend to the pterygopalatine ganglion

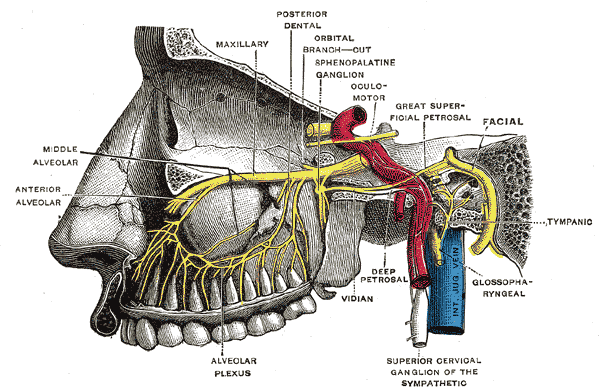
- Alveolar branches of superior maxillary nerve and pterygopalatine ganglion. (Pterygopalatine nerves visible but not labeled.)

- An illustration of the path of the maxillary nerve.

Details
- From: Maxillary nerve
- To: Pterygopalatine ganglion

Identifiers
- Latin: nervi pterygopalatini, nervi sphenopalatini
- TA98: A14.2.01.039
- TA2: 6218
- FMA: 52731

The two pterygopalatine nerves (or sphenopalatine branches) descend to the pterygopalatine ganglion.

Although it is closely related to the pterygopalatine ganglion, it is still considered a branch of the maxillary nerve and does not synapse in the ganglion.

It is found in the pterygopalatine fossa.

== Additional images ==
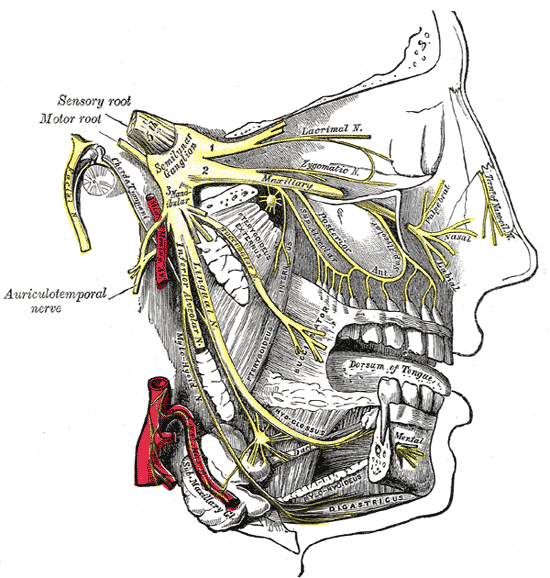
Distribution of the maxillary and mandibular nerves, and the submaxillary ganglion.
