= Pterygomaxillary fissure =

Fissure of the human skull

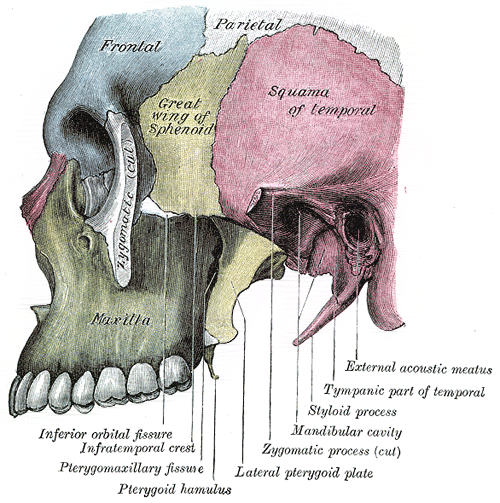
- Left infratemporal fossa. (Pterygomaxillary fissure labeled at bottom left.)

Details

Identifiers
- Latin: fissura pterygomaxillaris
- TA98: A02.1.00.026
- TA2: 430
- FMA: 76627

The pterygomaxillary fissure is a fissure of the human skull. It is vertical, and descends at right angles from the medial end of the inferior orbital fissure. It is a triangular interval, formed by the divergence of the maxilla from the pterygoid process of the sphenoid.

It connects the infratemporal with the pterygopalatine fossa, and transmits the terminal part of the maxillary artery. The posterior superior alveolar nerve of the maxillary nerve goes from the pterygopalatine fossa to the infratemporal region via this fissure. The pterygopalatine plates are separated laterally from the posterior surface of the body of the maxilla by the pterygomaxillary fissure.

In older texts, the pterygomaxillary fissure is sometimes called the pterygopalatine fissure.
