= Rostral neuropore =

Rostral neuropore or Anterior neuropore

Details

Identifiers
- Latin: neuroporus rostralis
- TE: neuropore_by_E5.14.1.0.0.0.6 E5.14.1.0.0.0.6

The rostral neuropore or anterior neuropore is a region corresponding to the opening of the embryonic neural tube in the anterior portion of the developing prosencephalon. The central nervous system develops from the neural tube, which initially starts as a plate of cells in the ectoderm and this is called the neural plate, the neural plate then undergoes folding and starts closing from the center of the developing fetus, this leads to two open ends, one situated cranially/rostrally and the other caudally. Bending of the neural plate begins on day 22, and the cranial neuropore closes on day 24, giving rise to the lamina terminalis of the brain.

== Failure to close ==
- Failure of closure of the anterior neuropore during embryogenesis will lead to anencephaly, the failure of the brain and skull to develop. In less severe situations it may lead to different forms of encephalocele (i.e. cranium bifidum). There are three forms of cranium bifidum: meningocele, meningo-encephalocele and meningohydro-encephalocele. In which respectively protrude the meninges, the meninges and brain tissue and lastly meninges, brain tissue and cranial ventricles.
- Failure of closure of the posterior neuropore (caudal neuropore) during embryogenesis will lead to spina bifida. This condition is always marked by a local lack of osteogenesis, or bone growth. The reason is that the correct differentiation and placement of underlying tissues (the spinal cord and spinal nerves and associated tissues) induce the osteogenesis, even small flaws in the underlying tissues can lead to a problem in the formation of the spine (vertebrae). Occasionally spina bifida is accompanied by a protrusion of the meninges and cerebrospinal fluid (meningocele) or protrusion of meninges, cerebrospinal fluid and nerve tissue (meningomyelocele).
