= Pharyngeal nerve =

Small branch of the maxillary nerve

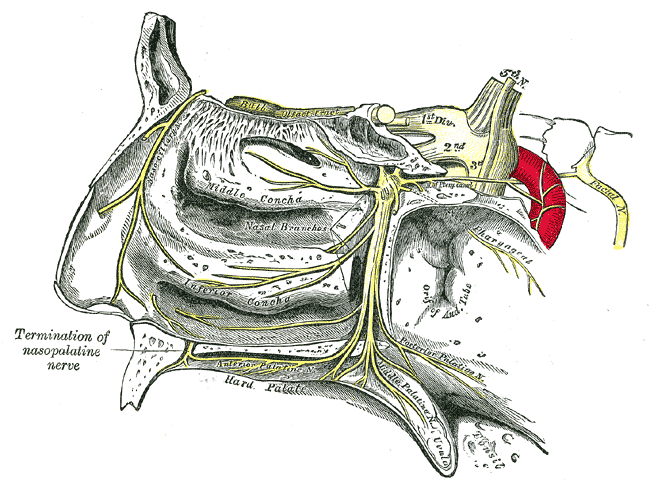
- The pterygopalatine ganglion and its branches. (Pharyngeal visible at center right.)

Details
- From: pterygopalatine ganglion

Identifiers
- Latin: nervus pharyngeus
- TA98: A14.2.01.044
- TA2: 6223
- FMA: 77524

The pharyngeal nerve is a small branch of the maxillary nerve (CN V_{2}), arising at the posterior part of the pterygopalatine ganglion. It passes through the palatovaginal canal with the pharyngeal branch of the maxillary artery.

It is distributed to the mucous membrane of the nasopharynx (its posterior wall, posterior to the pharyngotympanic tube). It also issues some minute orbital branches which pass through the inferior orbital fissure to enter the orbit and innervate the periosteum of the floor of the orbit, and the mucosa of the sphenoid sinus and ethmoid sinus.

== See also ==
- Pharyngeal branch of vagus nerve
