= Lesser palatine canals =

Passages in Palatine bone for nerves and vessels

Details

Identifiers
- Latin: canales palatini minores
- TA98: A02.1.13.008
- TA2: 805
- FMA: 75361

The lesser palatine canals (also accessory palatine canals) are passages in the palatine bone that carry the lesser and middle palatine nerves and vessels.

== Structure ==
The lesser palatine canals start from the greater palatine canal, and run with them, also opening into the roof of the oral cavity. Their openings are known as the lesser palatine foramina, and they transmit the lesser palatine artery, vein, and nerve, as well as the middle palatine vessels and nerve.

== See also ==
- Pterygopalatine fossa
