= Greater palatine foramen =

Hole in the human palate

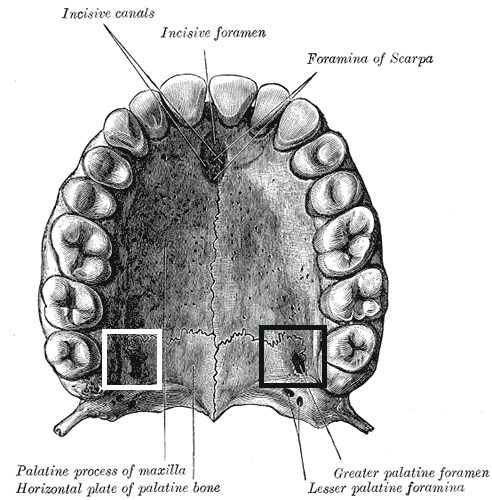
- Permanent teeth of upper dental arch, seen from below. (Greater palatine foramen labeled at lower right.)

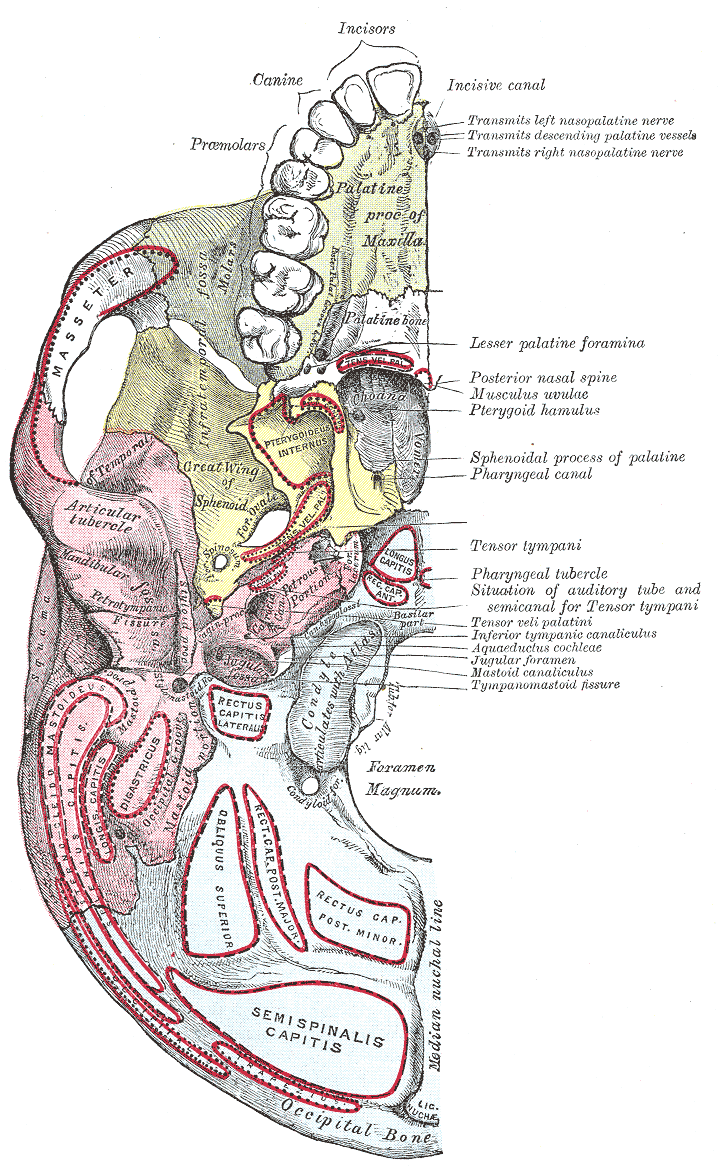
- Base of skull. Inferior surface.

Details

Identifiers
- Latin: foramen palatinum majus
- TA98: A02.1.00.058
- TA2: 463
- FMA: 53173

The greater palatine foramen is, along with the lesser palatine foramen, one of two foramina (holes) in each of the left and right palatine bones which form the posterior roof of the human mouth, known as the palate. It is sometimes known as the major palatine foramen.

The greater palatine foramen functions primarily for the transmission of the descending palatine vessels and greater palatine nerve; running anteriorly (forward) and medially (towards the center-line) from it is a groove, for the same vessels and nerve.

== Anatomy ==
The greater palatine foramen is slightly larger than the lesser, and is positioned more anteriorly and laterally on the palatine bone, nearly bordering the maxilla.

== Variations ==
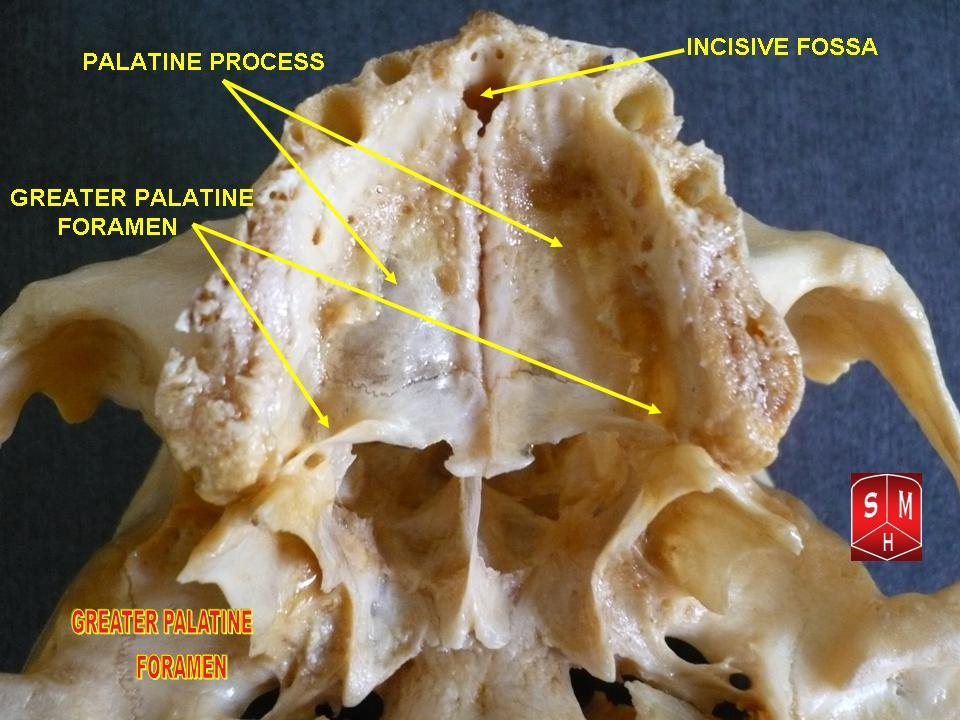
Greater palatine foramen

The greater palatine foramen (GPF) is related to the upper 3rd molar tooth in most of the skulls (55%), 2nd molar in (12%), between the 2nd and 3rd molar in (19%) and retromolar in (14%). The shape of the foramen is elongated antero-posteriorly; however, an unusually crescent shaped foramen is rare.

== See also ==
- Greater palatine canal
- Lesser palatine foramina
