= Neuropoiesis =

Neuropoiesis is the process by which neural stem cells differentiate to form mature neurons, astrocytes, and oligodendrocytes in the adult mammal. This process is also referred to as adult neurogenesis.

== History ==
While rapid neurogenesis was known to occur in the early stages of life, the production and differentiation of neural stem cells was believed to cease upon maturity. This belief was overturned in the 1960s by the work of Joseph Altman. Using injections of thymidine-H^{3} to label the nuclei of dividing cells, Altman was able to use autoradiography to determine a neuronal birthdate for each cell in a rat's brain. This research revealed some degree of adult neurogenesis in the hippocampus and olfactory bulb of rats, and paved the way for the possibility of neuropoiesis in the adult mammalian brain.

Following Altman's work, thymidine-H^{3} injections were used to examine the brains of a variety of other species. In the late 1970s Steven Goldman used this technique to examine the vocal control centers of songbirds, and he found widespread evidence of adult neurogenesis in this area of a canary's brain. Subsequent studies by Goldman and others revealed the precise mechanisms for neuronal cell differentiation and migration in adult songbirds, and, along with studies done in fish and other species, laid the groundwork for the study of neuropoiesis in humans.

== Neuropoietic areas in the human brain ==
The most recognized initial sites of neuropoiesis ending with neurons in adults are the subventricular zone (SVZ), the thin layer of cells just beneath the surface of the lateral ventricles of the brain, and the dentate gyrus of the hippocampus. Neural precursor cells in the human SVZ are known to yield offspring which can then produce glial cells or even migrate and form new neurons in specific areas such as the mammalian olfactory bulb.

== Mechanisms of neuropoiesis ==
Although the exact chemical signaling pathways which regulate Neuropoiesis are still poorly understood, there have been some recent advances in this field. Hematopoiesis, the differentiation of stem cells in the bone marrow to form blood cells, is a comparatively well studied phenomenon, and the study of hematopoiesis has yielded some insight into the mechanisms of neuropoiesis. Several developmental genes (e.g. Notch, Delta, neurogenin, neuregulin, OCT, Presenilin) growth factors (e.g. epidermal growth factor, NGF, brain-derived neurotrophic factor), and extracellular matrix proteins (e.g. tenascin, CD34) have been linked to the mechanisms of neuropoiesis. Many of these factors were originally identified as involved in hematopoiesis, but have since been found in neuropoetic cells in the SVZ.

== Research applications ==
While a full understanding of neuropoiesis is still some time away, there are numerous applications for this research. A complete understanding of the mechanisms for neural differentiation and proliferation could prove to be crucial to the treatment of neurodegenerative diseases. Towards this end, many researchers are attempting to control the differentiation and proliferation of neural stem cells in vivo by altering the expression of key genes such as presenilins and the sonic hedgehog pathway.

== See also ==
- Neurogenesis
