= Foramen lacerum =

Triangular hole in the base of the skull

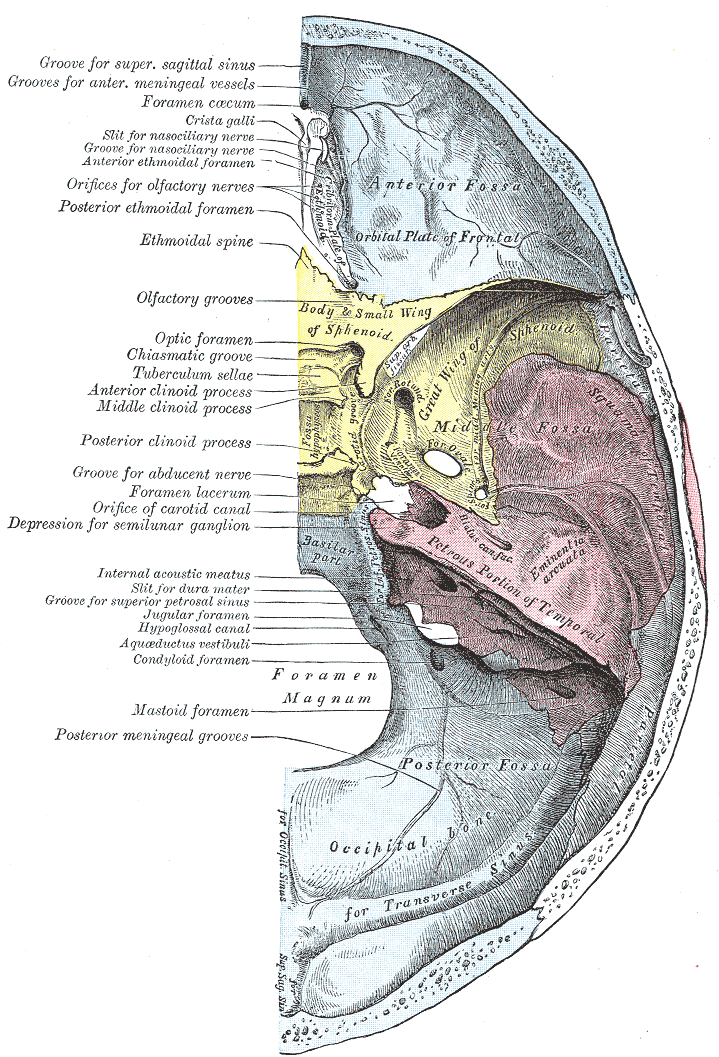
- Base of the skull. Upper surface. (Foramen lacerum is labeled at center left, and is visible as the large hole between yellow sphenoid, red temporal, and blue occipital)

Details
- System: Skeletal
- Parts: Temporal bone, sphenoid bone, occipital bone

Identifiers
- Latin: foramen lacerum
- TA98: A02.1.00.055
- TA2: 459
- FMA: 54809

The foramen lacerum (Latin: lacerated piercing) is a triangular hole in the base of the skull. It is located between the sphenoid bone, the apex of the petrous part of the temporal bone, and the basilar part of the occipital bone.

== Structure ==
The foramen lacerum (Latin: lacerated piercing) is a triangular hole in the base of skull. It is located between 3 bones:

- sphenoid bone (forming the anterior border)
- apex of petrous part of temporal bone (forming the posterolateral border)
- basilar part of occipital bone (forming the posteromedial border)

It is the junction point of 3 sutures of the skull:

- petroclival (petrooccipital) suture
- sphenopetrosal suture
- sphenooccipital suture

=== Contents ===
Structures passing through the foramen lacerum include:

- greater petrosal nerve and deep petrosal nerve which merge within the foramen to form the nerve of the pterygoid canal
- nerve of the pterygoid canal
- artery of the pterygoid canal
- recurrent artery of the foramen lacerum (supplies the internal carotid plexus)
- emissary veins (connecting extracranial pterygoid plexus with the intracranial cavernous sinus)
- one of the terminal branches of the ascending pharyngeal artery

=== Relations ===
It is situated anteromedially to the carotid canal.

The internal carotid artery passes from the carotid canal in the base of the skull, emerging and coursing superior to foramen lacerum as it exits the carotid canal; the internal carotid artery does not travel through foramen lacerum (the segment of the internal carotid artery that travels superior to the foramen lacerum is called the lacerum segment).

=== Development ===
The foramen lacerum fills with cartilage after birth.

== Clinical significance ==
The foramen lacerum has been described as a portal of entry into the cranium for tumours, including nasopharyngeal carcinoma, juvenile angiofibroma, adenoid cystic carcinoma, melanoma, and lymphoma.

== History ==
The first recorded mention of the foramen lacerum was by anatomist Wenzel Gruber in 1869. Study of the foramen has been neglected for many years because of the small role it plays in intracranial surgery.

== Additional images ==
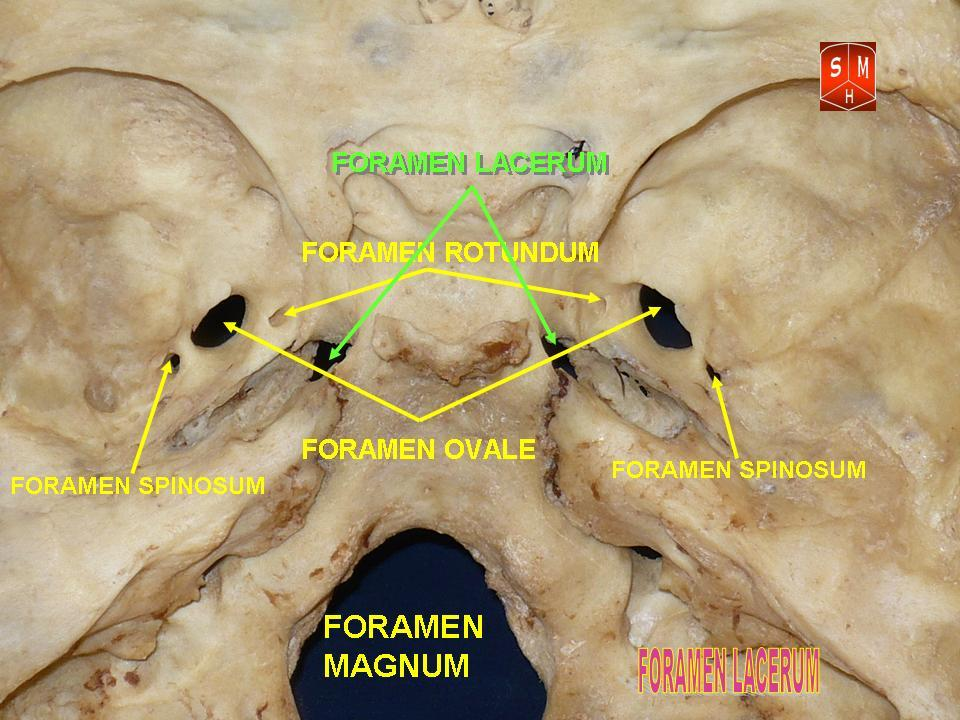
Foramen lacerum
