= Nerve of pterygoid canal =

Nerve group in the skull

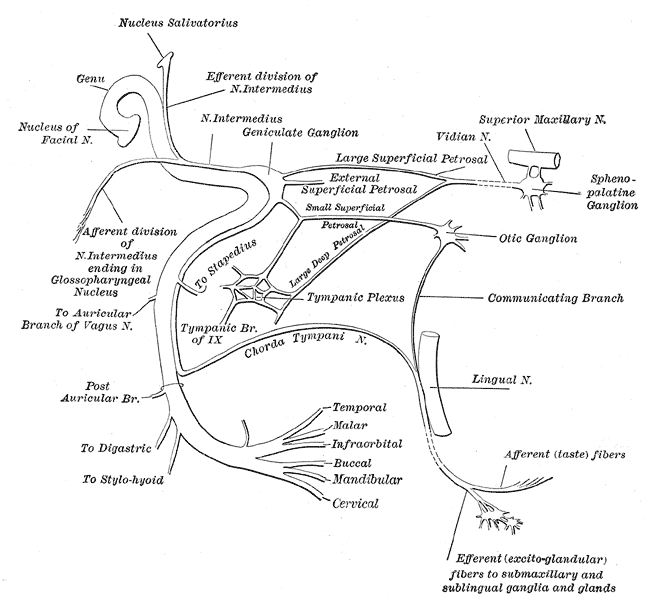
- Plan of the facial and intermediate nerves and their communication with other nerves. (Vidian nerve labeled at upper right.)

Details
- From: Greater petrosal nerve, deep petrosal nerve
- To: Pterygopalatine ganglion

Identifiers
- Latin: n. canalis pterygoidei
- TA98: A14.3.02.007
- TA2: 6290
- FMA: 67584

The nerve of the pterygoid canal (Vidian nerve) is formed by the union of the (parasympathetic) greater petrosal nerve and (sympathetic) deep petrosal nerve within the cartilaginous substance filling the foramen lacerum. From the foramen lacerum, the nerve of the pterygoid canal passes through the pterygoid canal to reach the pterygopalatine fossa, ending at the pterygopalatine ganglion.

== Structure ==
The nerve of the pterygoid canal forms from the junction of the greater petrosal nerve and the deep petrosal nerve within the foramen lacerum. This combined nerve exits the foramen lacerum and travels to the pterygopalatine fossa through the pterygoid canal in the sphenoid.

The nerve of the pterygoid canal contains axons of both sympathetic and parasympathetic axons, specifically;

- preganglionic parasympathetic axons from the greater petrosal nerve, a branch of the facial nerve (cell bodies are located in the superior salivatory nucleus)
- postganglionic sympathetic axons from the deep petrosal nerve, a branch of the internal carotid plexus (cell bodies are located in the superior cervical ganglion)

== Function ==
The preganglionic parasympathetic axons synapse in the pterygopalatine ganglion, which contains the postganglionic neurons which provide secretomotor innervation to the lacrimal gland, as well as the nasal and palatine glands.

The postganglionic sympathetic axons do not synapse in the pterygopalatine ganglion, they travel on the branches of the maxillary nerve to provide sympathetic innervation to blood vessels.

== Additional images ==
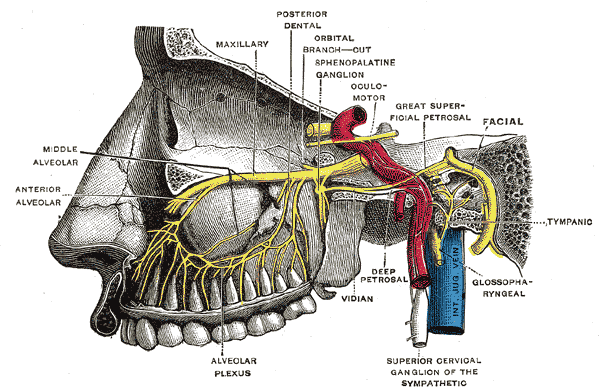
Alveolar branches of superior maxillary nerve and pterygopalatine ganglion.

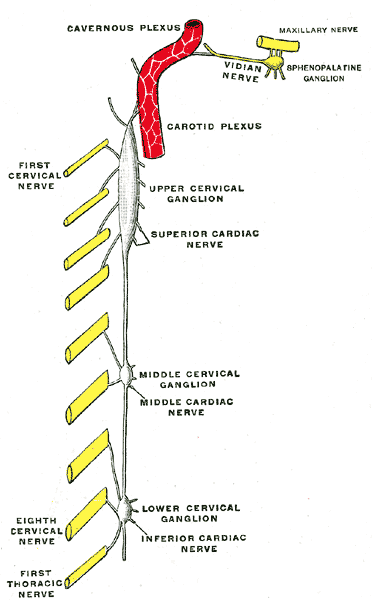
Diagram of the cervical sympathetic.

Depicts nerve branches that are involved in the autonomic innervation of the lacrimal gland. The terminal parts of the pathway are variable between individuals and differ for the other glands of the deep face.

== See also ==
- Vidus Vidius
