= Palatovaginal canal =

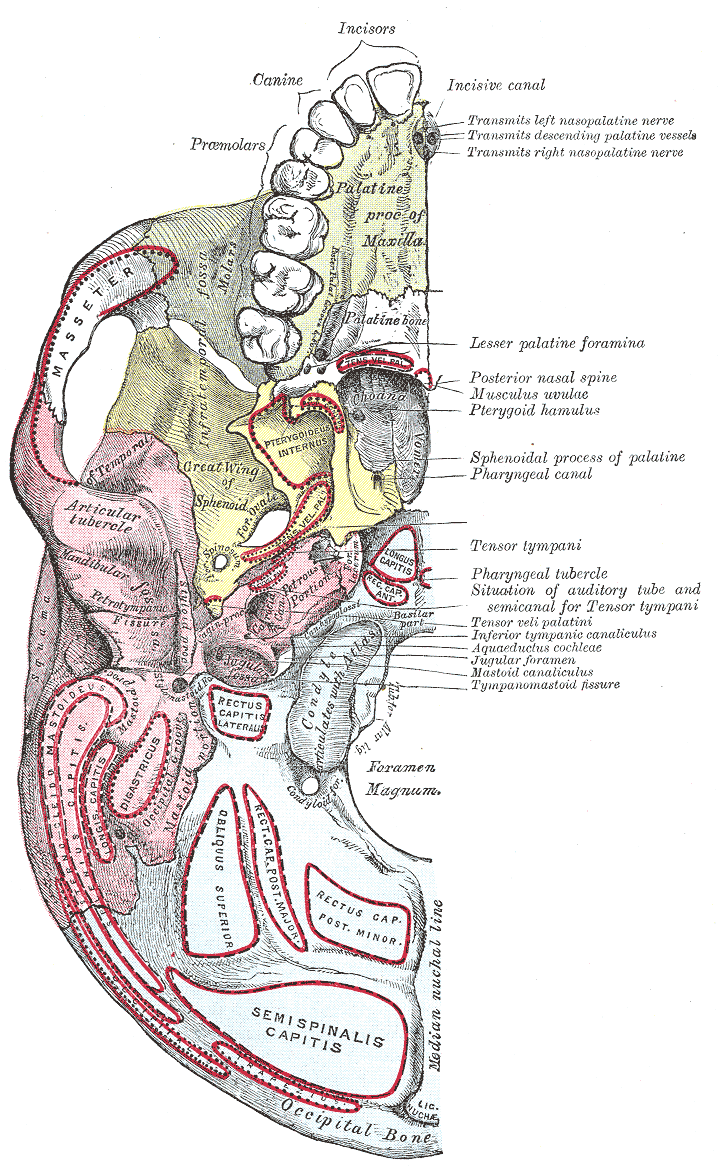
- Base of skull. Inferior surface. (Pharyngeal canal labeled at right, tenth label from the top.)

Details

Identifiers
- Latin: canalis palatovaginalis, canalis pharyngeus
- TA98: A02.1.00.064
- TA2: 466
- FMA: 54372

The palatovaginal canal (also pharyngeal canal) is a small canal formed between the sphenoidal process of palatine bone, and vaginal process of sphenoid bone. It connects the pterygopalatine fossa and and nasal cavity. It transmits the pharyngeal nerve (pharyngeal branch of maxillary nerve), and the pharyngeal branch of maxillary artery.

== Anatomy ==
Its proximal opening is situated inferoposteriorly in the pterygopalatine fossa.

Its distal opening is situated in the nasal cavity at the root of the pterygoid process near the lateral margin of the ala of vomer.

=== Variation ===
An inconstant vomerovaginal canal may lie between the ala of the vomer and the vaginal process of the sphenoid bone, medial to the palatovaginal canal, and lead into the anterior end of the palatovaginal canal.

=== Contents ===
The pharyngeal branch of the maxillary artery supplies the nasopharynx, posterior part of the roof of the nasal cavity, sphenoid sinus, and pharyngotympanic tube.
