= Pterygopalatine ganglion =

Parasympathetic ganglion in the pterygopalatine fossa

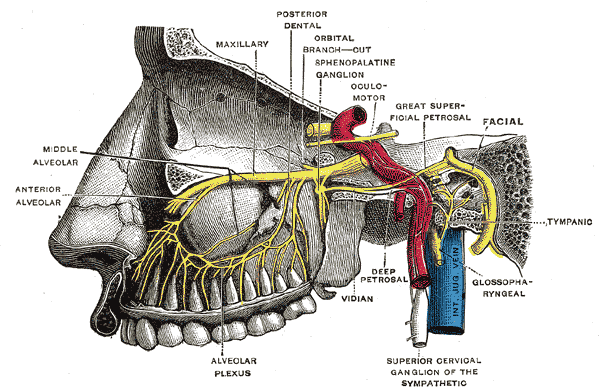
- Alveolar branches of superior maxillary nerve and pterygopalatine ganglion

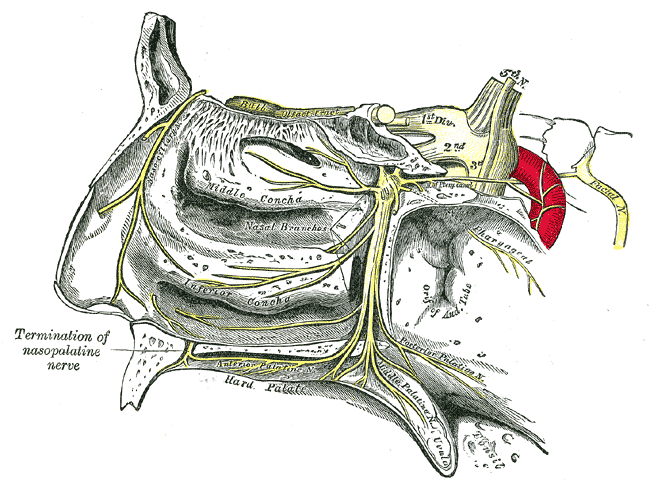
- The pterygopalatine ganglion and its branches (pterygopalatine ganglion visible but not labeled, as large yellow ganglion in upper-right center)

Details
- From: Maxillary nerve and nerve of pterygoid canal
- To: Greater palatine nerve, lesser palatine nerve, posterior lateral nasal branches and nasopalatine nerve

Identifiers
- Latin: ganglion pterygopalatinum
- TA98: A14.3.02.006
- TA2: 6665
- FMA: 6965

The pterygopalatine ganglion (aka Meckel's ganglion, nasal ganglion, or sphenopalatine ganglion) is a parasympathetic ganglion in the pterygopalatine fossa. It is one of four parasympathetic ganglia of the head and neck, (the others being the submandibular, otic, and ciliary ganglion).

It is innervated by the Vidian nerve (formed by the greater superficial petrosal nerve branch of the facial nerve and deep petrosal nerve) and maxillary division of the trigeminal nerve. Its postsynaptic axons project to the lacrimal glands and nasal mucosa.

The flow of blood to the nasal mucosa, in particular the venous plexus of the conchae, is regulated by the pterygopalatine ganglion and heats or cools the air in the nose.

== Structure ==
The pterygopalatine ganglion (of Meckel), the largest of the parasympathetic ganglia associated with the branches of the maxillary nerve, is deeply placed in the pterygopalatine fossa, close to the sphenopalatine foramen. It is triangular or heart-shaped, of a reddish-gray color, and is situated just below the maxillary nerve as it crosses the fossa.

The pterygopalatine ganglion supplies the lacrimal gland, paranasal sinuses, glands of the mucosa of the nasal cavity and pharynx, the gingiva, and the mucous membrane and glands of the hard palate. It communicates anteriorly with the nasopalatine nerve.

== Roots ==
It receives a sensory, a parasympathetic, and a sympathetic root.

=== Sensory root ===
Its sensory root is derived from two sphenopalatine branches of the maxillary nerve of the trigeminal nerve; their fibers, for the most part, pass directly into the palatine nerves; a few, however, enter the ganglion, constituting its sensory root.

=== Parasympathetic root ===
Its parasympathetic root is derived from the nervus intermedius (a part of the facial nerve) through the greater petrosal nerve.

In the pterygopalatine ganglion, the preganglionic parasympathetic fibers from the greater petrosal branch of the facial nerve synapse with neurons whose postganglionic axons, vasodilator, and secretory fibers are distributed with the deep branches of the trigeminal nerve to the mucous membrane of the nose, soft palate, tonsils, uvula, roof of the mouth, upper lip and gums, and upper part of the pharynx. It also sends postganglionic parasympathetic fibers to the lacrimal nerve (a branch of the ophthalmic nerve, also part of the trigeminal nerve) via the zygomatic nerve, a branch of the maxillary nerve (from the trigeminal nerve), which then arrives at the lacrimal gland.

The nasal glands are innervated with secretomotor fibers from the nasal branches. Likewise, the palatine glands are innervated by the nasopalatine, greater palatine nerve and lesser palatine nerves. The pharyngeal nerve innervates pharyngeal glands. These are all branches of maxillary nerve.

=== Sympathetic root ===
The ganglion also consists of sympathetic efferent (postganglionic) fibers from the superior cervical ganglion. These fibers, from the superior cervical ganglion, travel through the carotid plexus, and then through the deep petrosal nerve. The deep petrosal nerve (carrying postganglionic sympathetics) joins with the greater petrosal nerve (carrying preganglionic parasympathetics) to form the nerve of the pterygoid canal, which passes through the pterygoid canal before entering the ganglion. The stellate ganglion is at the bottom of the cervical sympathetic chain. Fibers from the stellate ganglion pass up the chain to the superior cervical sympathetic ganglion and into and through the sphenopalatine ganglion.

=== Branches ===
- Orbital branches
- Nasopalatine nerve
- Greater palatine nerve
- Lesser palatine nerve
- Posterior superior lateral nasal branches
- Pharyngeal branch of maxillary nerve

== Blockade and neuromodulation of the pterygopalatine (sphenopalatine) ganglion ==
Blockade of the ganglion with local anesthetic, clinically referred to as a 'sphenopalatine ganglion block' may be performed transcutaneously with a small needle, or topically via the nose with local anesthetic soaked swabs. The topical sphenopalatine ganglion block is used for treatment of persistent migraines and cluster headaches, demonstrating relief within 10–20 minutes. Sphenopalatine ganglion block has been used to treat post-dural-puncture headache, though a 2020 trial comparing local anaesthetic sphenopalatine ganglion block to sham injection with saline failed to show difference in pain scores for those receiving local anaesthetic vs placebo, suggesting any efficacy is unrelated to local anaesthetic blockade.

Self-administration of sphenopalatine ganglion blocks with cotton-tipped catheters and continual capillary feed is the most cost-effective method of treatment and has the benefit of allowing patients to avoid visits to physicians and emergency rooms. After initial visit self-administered sphenopalatine ganglion blocks are less than $1.00 per application. Frequent repeated administration of sphenopalatine ganglion blocks seems to increase effectiveness initially, after which decreased frequency is required. Self-administered sphenopalatine ganglion blocks can be used to treat acute pain symptoms, and prophylactically to reduce the onset of painful conditions and anxiety.

== Self-administration of sphenopalatine ganglion blocks ==
Self-administered sphenopalatine ganglion blocks are extremely helpful for treatment of migraines, chronic daily headaches, anxiety and temporomandibular joint disorders. Neuromuscular dentistry and the role of the autonomic nervous system: Sphenopalatine ganglion blocks and neuromodulation. An International College of Cranio Mandibular Orthopedics (ICCMO) position paper They are also effective in about 1/3 of cases of essential hypertension.Bilateral sphenopalatine ganglion block reduces blood pressure in never treated patients with essential hypertension. A randomized controlled single-blinded study

The sphenopalatine ganglion block has been called "The Miracle Block" after publication of Albert Bengamin Gerber's book Miracles on Park Avenue, the story of octogenerian otorhinolargyngologist Dr. Milton Reder, whose entire medical practice was based on that procedure.

There are multiple new devices utilized for neuromodulation of the sphenopalatine ganglion. There is one non-invasive device, a myomonitor, an ultra low frequency transcutaneous electrical nerve stimulation that has been utilized safely for more than 50 years by neuromuscular dentists in the diagnosis and treatment of temporomandibular joint disorders and orofacial pain conditions. Sphenopalatine ganglion neuromodulation (possibly via the vagal nerve) is a secondary effect making it extremely effective for TMD.Neuromuscular dentistry and the role of the autonomic nervous system: Sphenopalatine ganglion blocks and neuromodulation. An International College of Cranio Mandibular Orthopedics (ICCMO) position paper

== Additional images ==
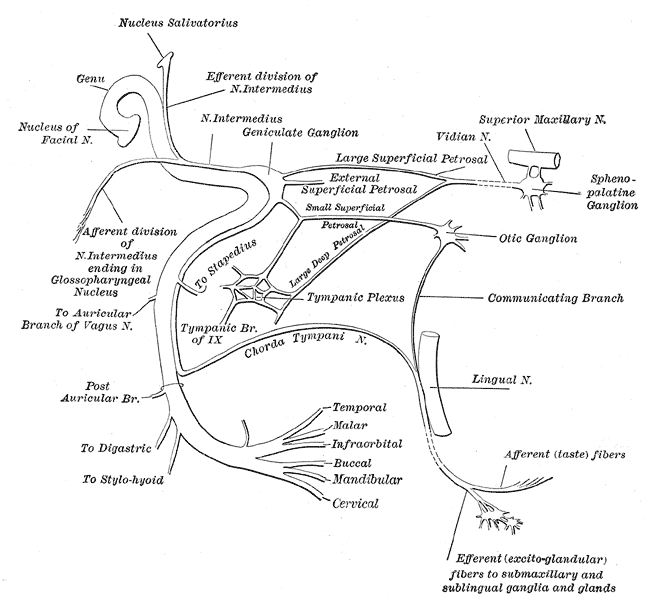
Plan of the facial and intermediate nerves and their communication with other nerves.

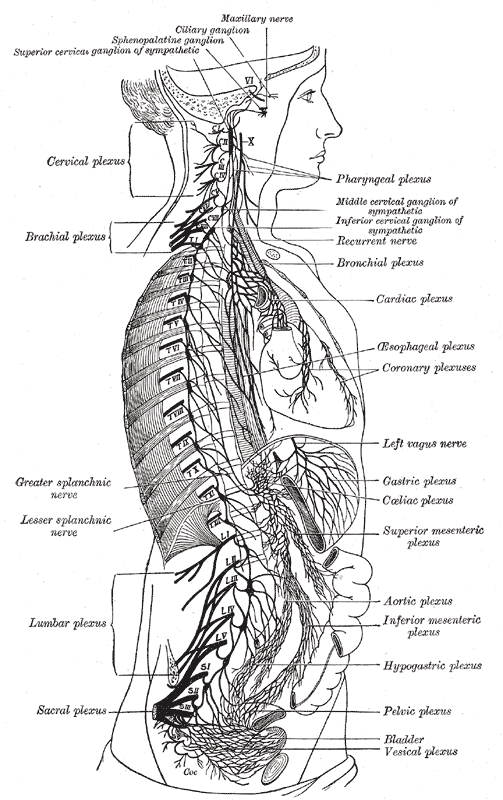
The right sympathetic chain and its connections with the thoracic, abdominal, and pelvic plexuses.

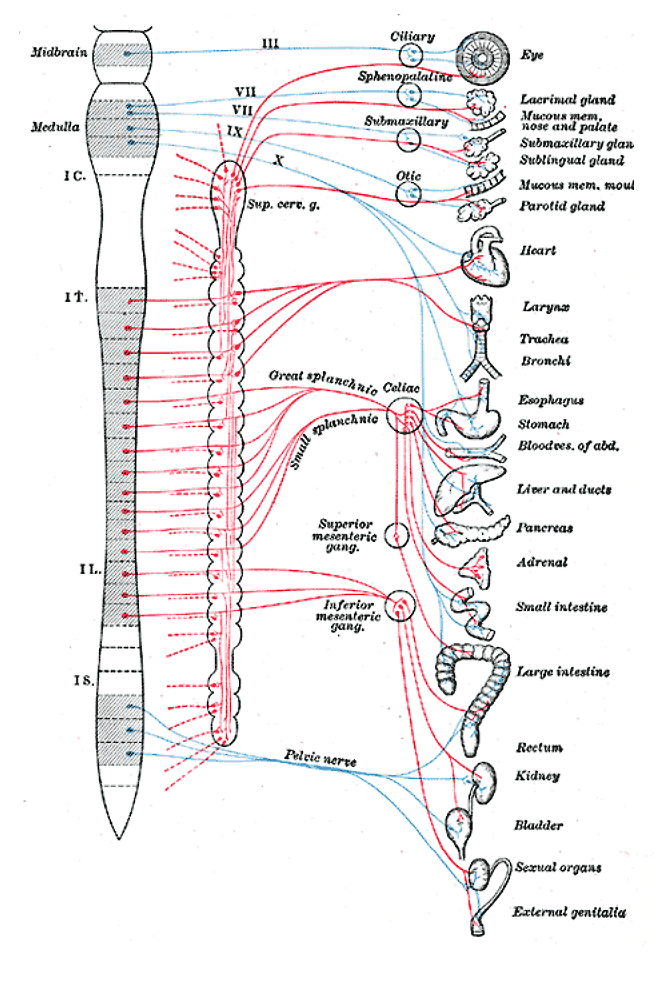
Diagram of efferent sympathetic nervous system.

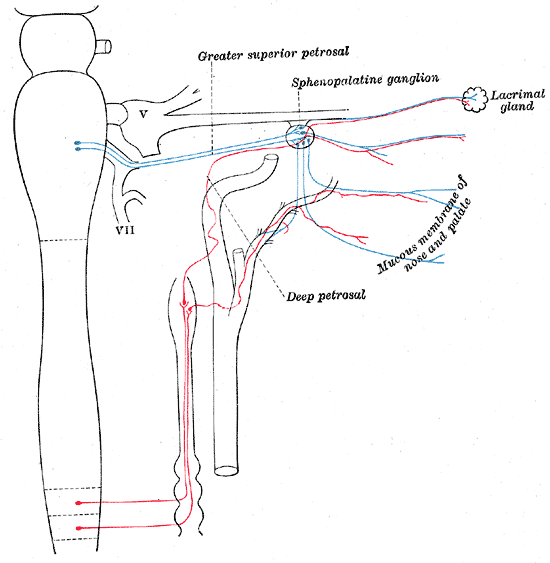
Sympathetic connections of the sphenopalatine and superior cervical ganglia.

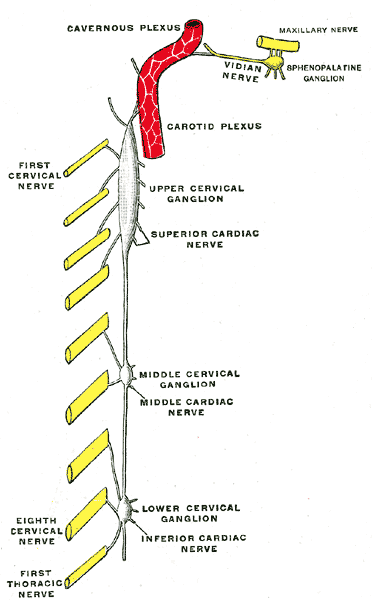
Diagram of the cervical sympathetic.

An illustration of the path of the Maxillary nerve.

Depicts nerve branches that are involved in the autonomic innervation of the lacrimal gland. The terminal parts of the pathway are variable between individuals and differ for the other glands of the deep face.
