= Greater palatine nerve =

Branch of the pterygopalatine ganglion

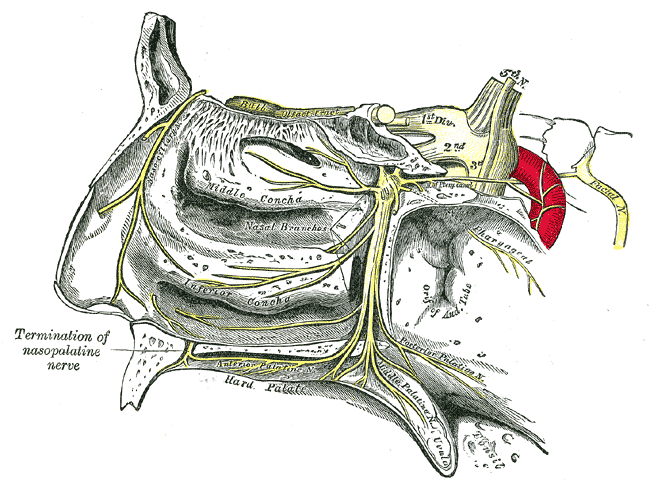
- The sphenopalatine ganglion and its branches. (Anterior palatine at bottom center)

Details
- From: Pterygopalatine ganglion
- Innervates: Upper gums and mucous membrane and glands of hard palate

Identifiers
- Latin: nervus palatinus major, nervus palatinus anterior
- TA98: A14.2.01.045
- TA2: 6224
- FMA: 52802

The greater palatine nerve is a branch of the pterygopalatine ganglion. This nerve is also referred to as the anterior palatine nerve, due to its location anterior to the lesser palatine nerve. It carries both general sensory fibres from the maxillary nerve, and parasympathetic fibers from the nerve of the pterygoid canal. It may be anaesthetised for procedures of the mouth and maxillary (upper) teeth.

== Structure ==
The greater palatine nerve is a branch of the pterygopalatine ganglion. It descends through the greater palatine canal, moving anteriorly and inferiorly. Here, it is accompanied by the descending palatine artery. It emerges upon the hard palate through the greater palatine foramen. It then passes forward in a groove in the hard palate, nearly as far as the incisor teeth.

While in the pterygopalatine canal, it gives off lateral posterior inferior nasal branches, which enter the nasal cavity through openings in the palatine bone, and ramify over the inferior nasal concha and middle and inferior meatuses. At its exit from the canal, a palatine branch is distributed to both surfaces of the soft palate.

== Function ==
The greater palatine nerve carries both general sensory fibres from the maxillary nerve, and parasympathetic fibers from the nerve of the pterygoid canal. It supplies the gums, the mucous membrane and glands of the hard palate, and communicates in front with the terminal filaments of the nasopalatine nerve.

== Clinical significance ==
The greater palatine nerve may be anaesthetised to perform dental procedures on the maxillary (upper) teeth, and sometimes for cleft lip and cleft palate surgery.
