= Greater palatine canal =

Passage in the skull that transmits the descending palatine artery and vein

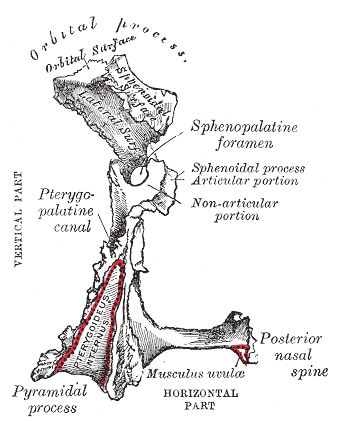
- Left palatine bone. Posterior aspect. Enlarged. (Pterygopalatine canal labeled at center left.)

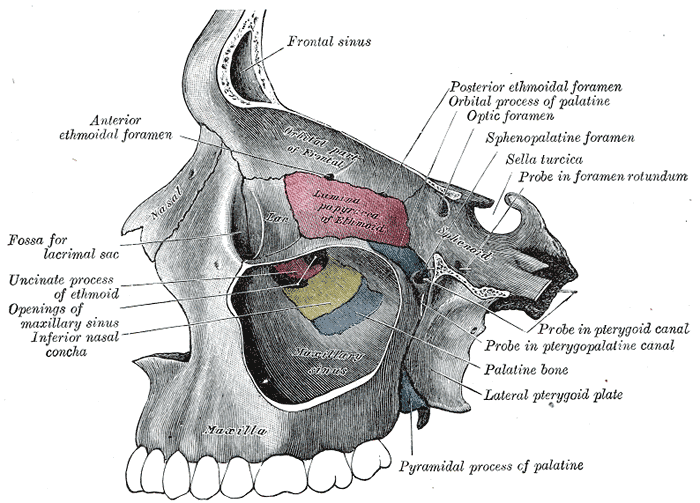
- Left maxillary sinus opened from the exterior. (Label "Probe in pterygopalatine canal" at center right.)

Details

Identifiers
- Latin: canalis palatinus major
- TA98: A02.1.00.057
- TA2: 462
- FMA: 57761

The greater palatine canal (or pterygopalatine canal) is a passage in the skull that transmits the descending palatine artery, vein, and greater and lesser palatine nerves between the pterygopalatine fossa and the oral cavity.

== Structure ==
The greater palatine canal starts on the inferior aspect of the pterygopalatine fossa. It goes through the maxilla and palatine bones to reach the palate, ending at the greater palatine foramen. From this canal, accessory canals branch off; these are known as the lesser palatine canals.

The canal is formed by a vertical groove on the posterior part of the maxillary surface of the palatine bone; it is converted into a canal by articulation with the maxilla.

The canal transmits the descending palatine vessels, the greater palatine nerve, and the lesser palatine nerve.

== See also ==
- Greater palatine foramen
- Pterygopalatine fossa

== Additional images ==
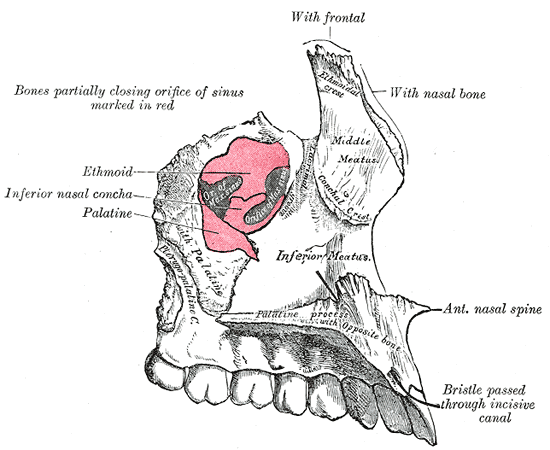
Left maxilla. Nasal surface.
