= Lesser palatine nerve =

Branch of the maxillary nerve

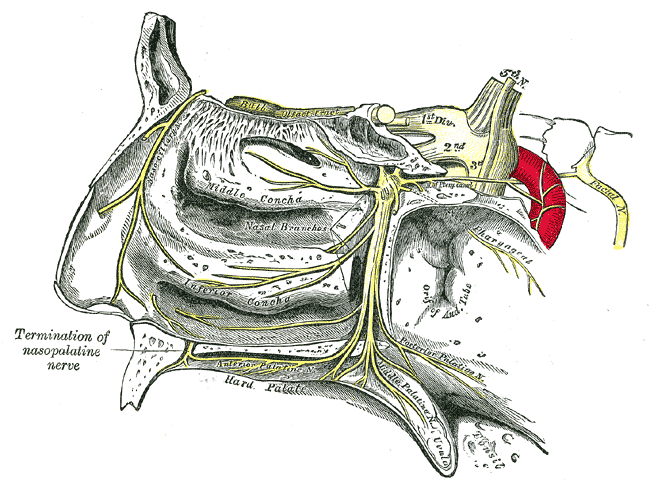
- The sphenopalatine ganglion and its branches. (Lesser palatine nerve at bottom right.)

Details
- From: Pterygopalatine ganglion
- Innervates: Soft palate, tonsil, and uvula

Identifiers
- Latin: nervi palatini minores
- TA98: A14.2.01.047
- TA2: 6227
- FMA: 52805

The lesser palatine nerves (posterior palatine nerve) are sensory branches of the maxillary nerve (CN V_{2}). They arise from the pterygopalatine ganglion and descend through the lesser palatine canal and emerge (separately) through the lesser palatine foramen to pass posterior-ward at the soft palate. They provide sensory innervation to the mucosa of the soft palate, tonsil, and uvula. The nerves also carry autonomic fibers that contribute to the palatine glands. The lesser palatine nerve is relevant in dental anesthesia and in surgical procedures involving the posterior palate.

== See also ==
- Greater palatine nerve
