= Schuller's view =

X-ray view of skull

Method of obtaining Schuller's view

Schuller's view is a lateral radiographic view of skull principally used for viewing mastoid cells. The central beam of X-rays passes from one side of the head and is at an angle of 25° caudad to the radiographic plate. This angulation prevents overlap of images of the two mastoid bones. The radiograph for each mastoid is taken separately. Schuller's view serves as an alternate view to the Law projection which uses a 15° angle of patient's face toward the image receptor and a 15° caudal angulation of the computed radiography (CR) to achieve the same result, a lateral mastoid air cells view without overlap of the opposite side. Under examination the outer ear (auricle) can be taped forward to avoid a cartilage shadow around mastoid. Older editions of Merrill's Atlas of Radiographic Positioning and Procedures books have detailed explanation of these and other mastoid positions. Newer version of texts often omits this because of the rarity of this exam in lieu of computed tomography (CT scan scans) studies.

== Structures seen ==
- Mastoid air cells
- External auditory canal
- Tympanic cavity
- Temporomandibular joint
- Dural plate
- Sinus plate
- Dense bone of labyrinth

== Observations ==
Observation	Description
Pneumatic	Air cells cover mastoid; Air cells seen beyond dural and sinus plates
Moderate	Air cells cover mastoid; Air cells not seen beyond dural and sinus plates
Sclerotic	Absence of air cells; Whole antrum appears small in size; Marked radiopacity; Can be seen in individuals suffering from chronic otitis media as well as in normal individuals
Radiolucent mastoid	Single radiolucent shadow is seen. It can be present in sclerotic as well as normal mastoid; Differential diagnosis: Cholesteatoma; Operated mastoidectomy; Large antral cell; Large peri-antral cell; Malignancy; Chronic mastoiditis with granulations; Eosinophilic granuloma; Tuberculosis; Multiple myeloma; Skull metastases from kidney, bronchus, breast etc.
