= Subarcuate fossa =

Depression in the temporal bone in the skull of mammals

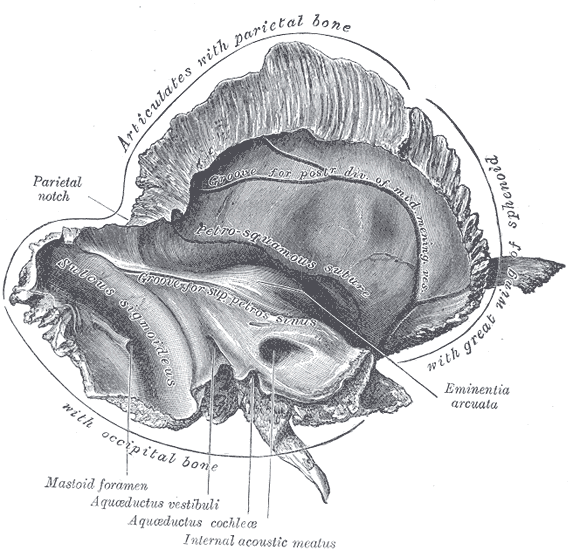
- Left temporal bone. Inner surface. (Subarcuate fossa not labeled, but aquaeductus vestibuli labeled at lower right.)

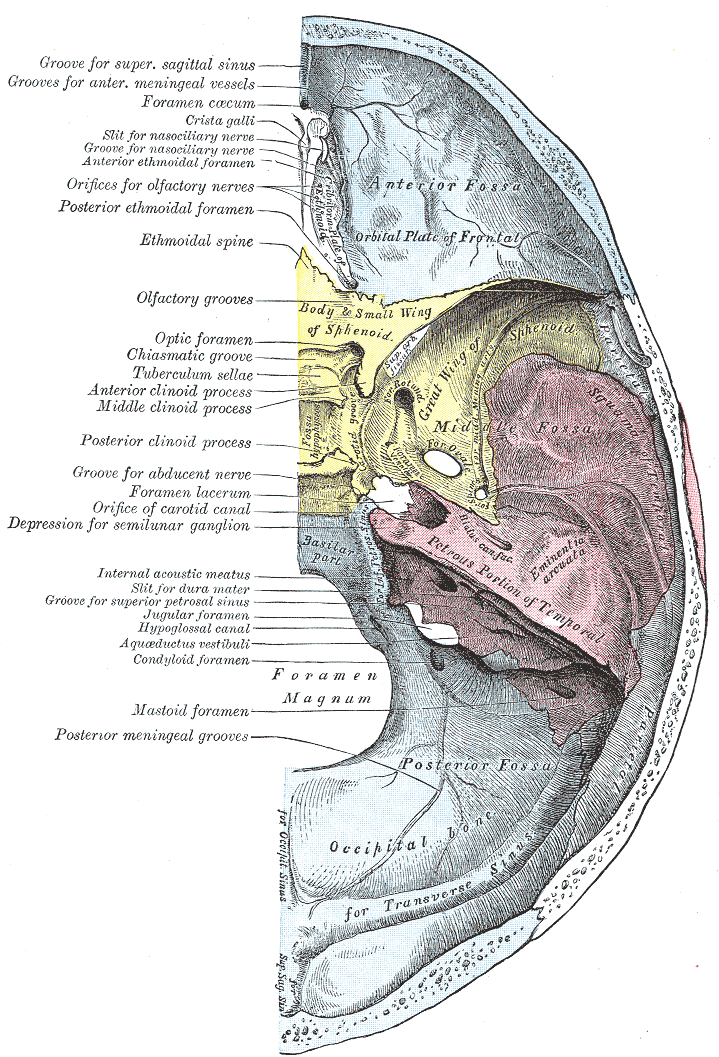
- Base of the skull. Upper surface. (Subarcuate fossa not labeled, but temporal bone is identified in pink, and "Eminentia arcuata" (i.e. arcuate eminence, corresponding to the superior semicircular canal) is labeled.)

Details

Identifiers
- Latin: fossa subarcuata ossis temporalis
- TA98: A02.1.06.034
- TA2: 672
- FMA: 56418

The subarcuate fossa is a shallow depression upon the internal surface of the petrous part of the temporal bone forming the wall of the posterior cranial fossa. The fossa accommodates the flocculus of the cerebellum. It is situated lateral/posterior to the internal auditory meatus.

== Anatomy ==
The subarcuate fossa is situated posteriorly and superiorly between the opening of the vestibular aqueduct and opening of internal auditory meatus.

The surface of the subarcuate fossa is lined with dura mater and lodges the endolymphatic sac and duct, as well as a minute artery and vein; some veins from the mucosa of mastoid antrum enter the cranial cavity at the subarcuate fossa to drain at the superior petrosal sinus - they are remnants of larger subarcuate veins of childhood and represent a possible route of intracranial infectious spread.

== Other animals ==
It is extensive in most primates (except for great apes) and nearly all mammals. In these animals, the subarcuate fossa houses a part of the cerebellum, the petrosal lobe.
