= Friedrich Arnold =

German anatomist and physiologist (1803–1890)

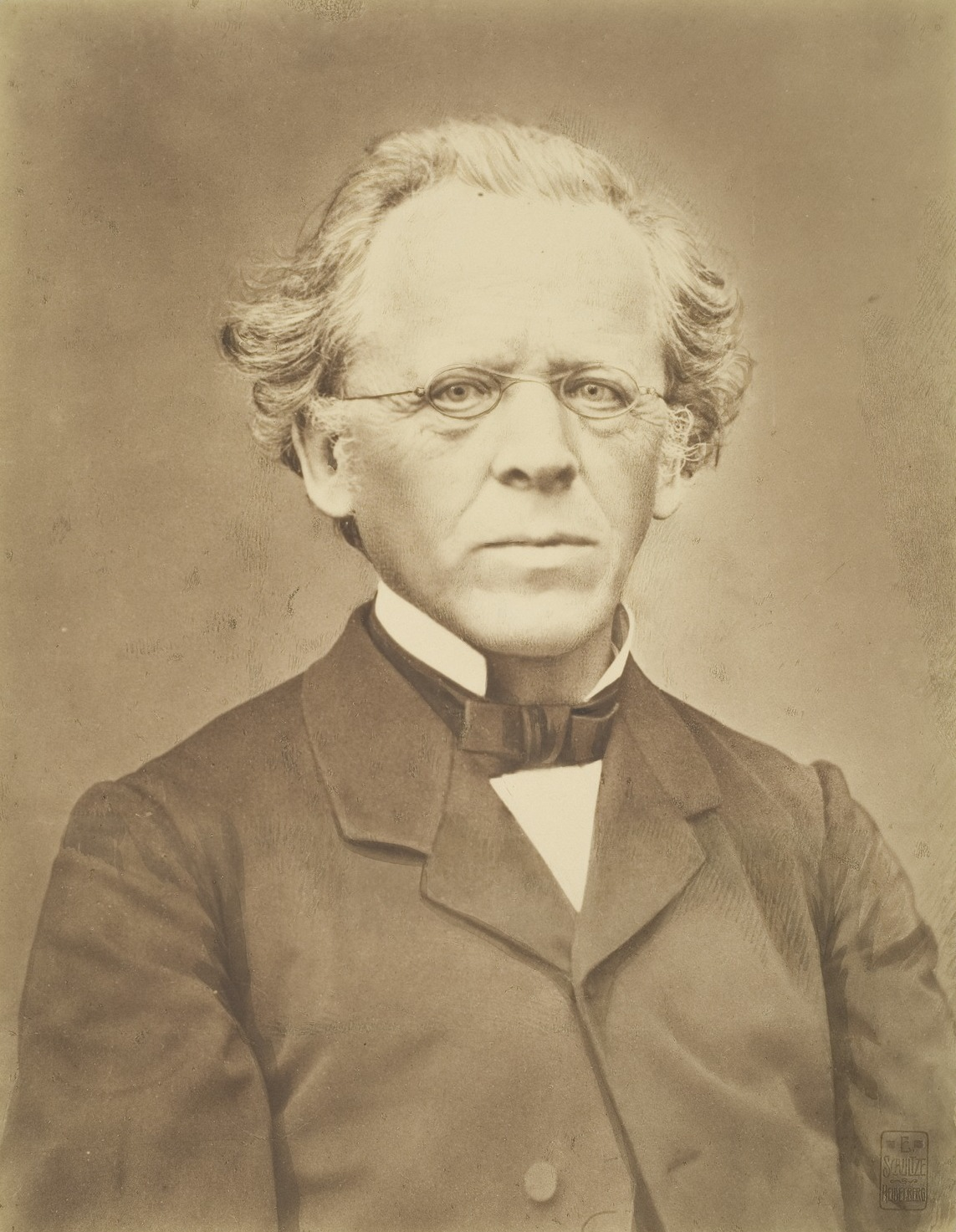
- Born: 8 January 1803; Edenkoben, Mont-Tonnerre, France
- Died: 5 July 1890 (aged 87); Heidelberg

Friedrich Arnold (8 January 1803 – 5 July 1890) was professor emeritus of anatomy and physiology at Heidelberg. He read medicine at the University of Heidelberg at the same time as his elder brother, Johann Wilhelm Arnold (1801–1873).

Arnold studied anatomy under Friedrich Tiedemann (1781–1861) and Vincenz Fohmann (1794-1837). He became a doctor of medicine on 7 September 1825 at Heidelberg, where several years later, he became an associate professor. From 1835, he worked at the universities of Zurich, Freiburg and Tübingen, returning to Heidelberg in 1852 as a professor of anatomy and physiology. Following his retirement, he was replaced at Heidelberg by Carl Gegenbaur (1826-1903).

The auricular branch of the vagus nerve was nicknamed "Arnold's nerve" after he described the reflex of coughing when the ear is stimulated. Other eponyms that contain his name are "Arnold's ganglion" (otic ganglion) and "Arnold's canal" (a passage of the petrous portion of the temporal bone for the auricular branch of the vagus nerve.

He was also privy counsellor in Heidelberg.

== Principal writings ==
- Tabulae anatomicae, quas ad naturam accurate descriptas in lucem edidit; 1838–42
- Abbildungen der Gelenke und Bänder des menschlichen Körpers; Zürich, 1843 (with his brother, Wilhelm): Lehrbuch der Physiologie des Menschen - Pictures of joints and ligaments of the human body.
- Handbuch der Anatomie des Menschen; 3 volumes, 1843–51 - Textbook of human anatomy.
