= Ganglion of vagus nerve =

Ganglion of vagus nerve may refer to:

- Inferior ganglion of vagus nerve
- Superior ganglion of vagus nerve
