= Fossa jugularis =

Fossa jugularis may refer to:

- Jugular fossa (fossa jugularis ossis temporalis)
- Suprasternal notch (fossa jugularis sterni)
