= Inferior ganglion of vagus nerve =

Ganglion of the peripheral nervous system

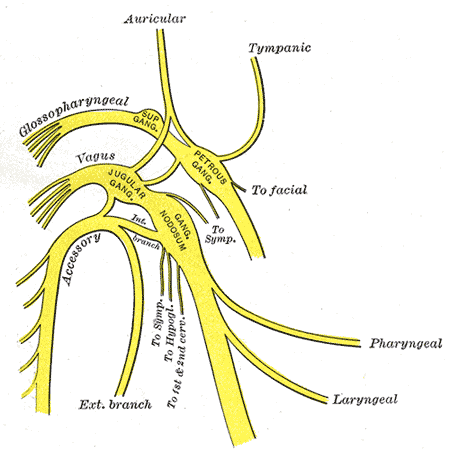
- Pathway of upper portions of glossopharyngeal, vagus, and accessory nerves. The inferior ganglion of the vagus nerve is labeled as ‘Gang. Nodosum’.

Details
- From: Vagus nerve

Identifiers
- Latin: ganglion inferius nervi vagi, ganglion nodosum
- MeSH: D009620
- TA98: A14.2.01.157
- TA2: 6336
- FMA: 6230

The inferior ganglion of the vagus nerve (also known as the nodose ganglion or (in veterinary anatomy) as the distal ganglion of the vagus nerve) is one of the two sensory ganglia of each vagus nerve (cranial nerve X). It contains neuron cell bodies of general visceral afferent fibers and special visceral afferent fibers. It is situated within the jugular fossa just below the skull. It is situated just below the superior ganglion of vagus nerve.

== Anatomy ==
The inferior ganglion of vagus nerve is elongated. It is larger than the superior ganglion of vagus nerve. It is situated within the jugular fossa, just inferior to the jugular foramen.

=== Structure ===
The inferior ganglion contains the neuron cell bodies of all sensory fibres of the CN X except those of the auricular branch of vagus nerve.

The neurons in the inferior ganglion of the vagus nerve are pseudounipolar and provide sensory innervation (general somatic afferent and general visceral afferent).

The axons of the neurons which innervate the taste buds of the epiglottis synapse in the rostral portion of the solitary nucleus (gustatory nucleus).

The axons of the neurons which provide general sensory information synapse in the spinal trigeminal nucleus.

The axons of the neurons which innervate the aortic bodies, aortic arch, respiratory and gastrointestinal tract, synapse in the caudal part of the solitary nucleus.

=== Distribution ===
The neurons in the inferior ganglion of the vagus nerve innervate the taste buds on the epiglottis, the chemoreceptors of the aortic bodies and baroreceptors in the aortic arch. Most importantly, the majority of neurons in the inferior ganglion provide sensory innervation to the heart, respiratory and gastrointestinal tracts.

=== Development ===
The neurons in the inferior ganglion of the vagus nerve are embryonically derived from epibranchial neurogenic placodes.
