= Petrosal branch of middle meningeal artery =

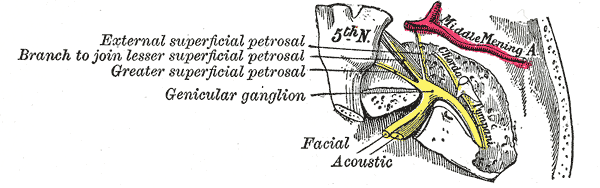
- The course and connections of the facial nerve in the temporal bone.

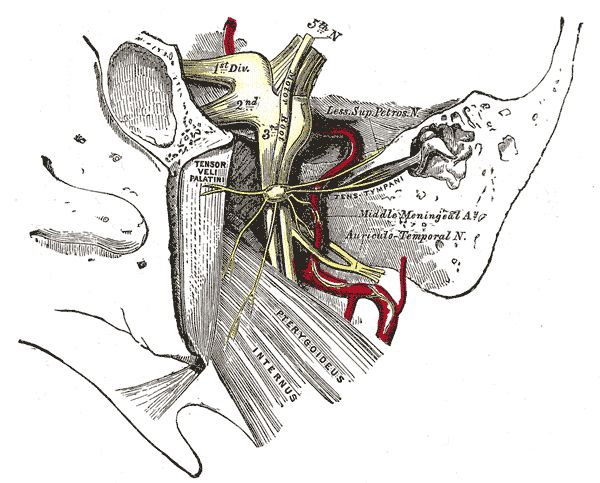
- The otic ganglion and its branches.

Details
- Source: Middle meningeal artery

Identifiers
- Latin: ramus petrosus arteriae meningeae mediae
- TA98: A12.2.05.066
- TA2: 4436
- FMA: 49719

The petrosal branch of middle meningeal artery enters the hiatus for greater petrosal nerve, supplies the facial nerve and anastomoses with the stylomastoid branch of the posterior auricular artery.

== See also ==
- stylomastoid artery
