= Cochlear =

Cochlear, the adjective form of cochlea, may refer to:

- Cochlear implant, a sensory aid for the deaf
- Cochlear nuclei, the ventral cochlear nucleus and the dorsal (or lateral) cochlear nucleus
- Vestibular-cochlear or Vestibulocochlear nerve, the eighth cranial nerve
- Cochlear nerve, a division of the eighth cranial nerve
- Cochlear aqueduct, or aqueduct of cochlea, a communication between the perilymphatic space and the subarachnoid space
- Cochlear artery, a division of the internal auditory artery
- Cochlea, part of the Labyrinth (inner ear)
- Cochlear duct, also known as the scala media, the endolymph-filled part of the cochlea
- Cochlear, an alternate term for the spoon (liturgy) used in the Eastern Orthodox Church in serving the sacramental wine, sometimes with a particle of the sacramental bread
- The spoon-like tip of the scape found on the epigyne of some female spiders
- Cochlear Limited, manufacturer of Nucleus Cochlear Implant
- Cochlear Bone Anchored Solutions, manufacturer of Baha bone anchored hearing aid
