= Petrous part of the temporal bone =

Feature at the base of the human skull

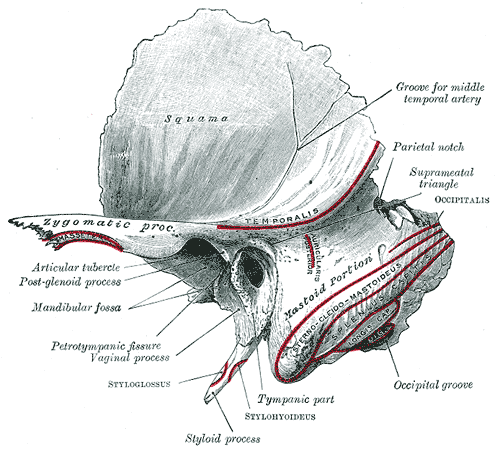
- Left temporal bone. Outer surface.

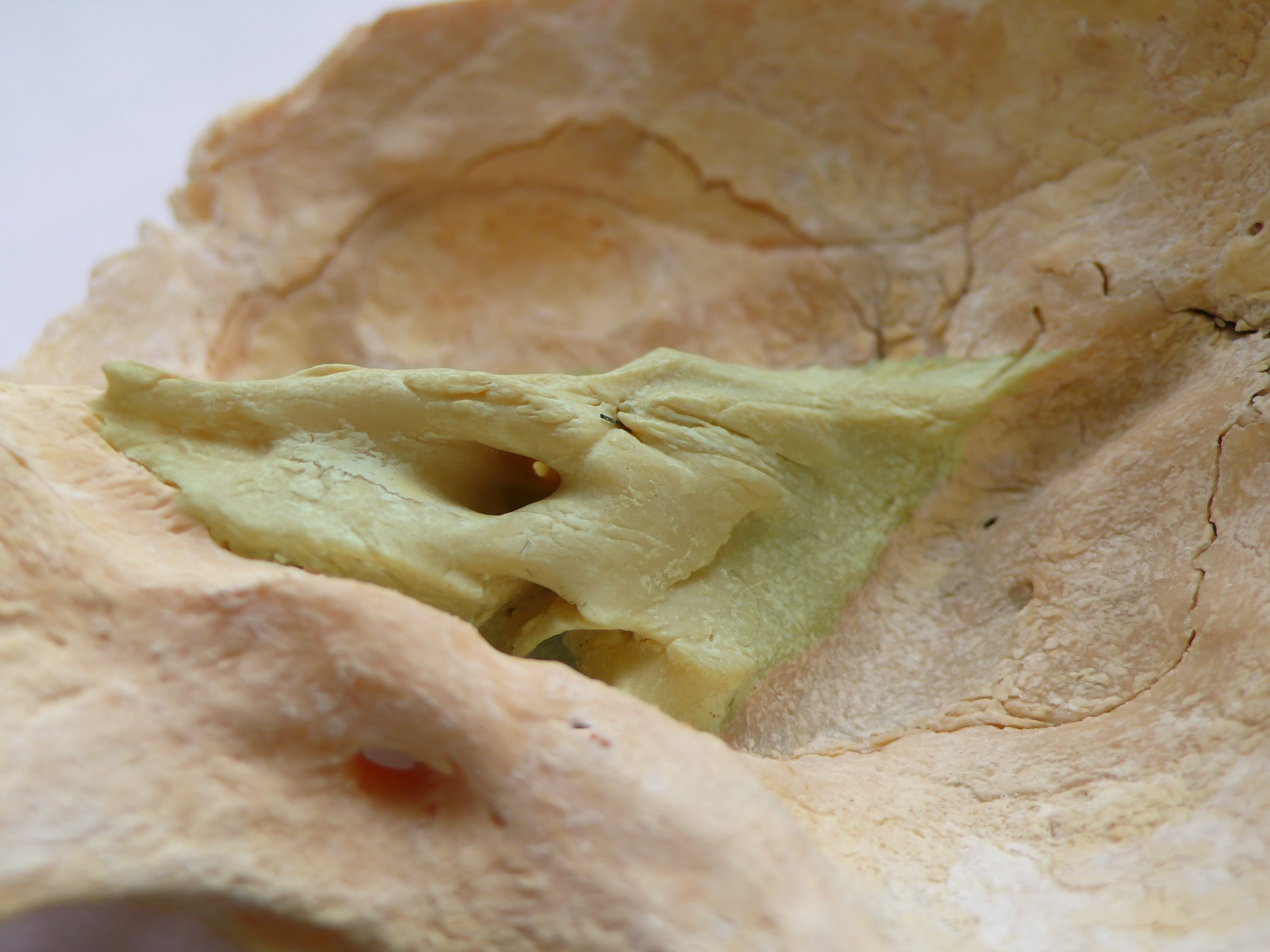
- Petrous part of the temporal bone

Details

Identifiers
- Latin: pars petrosa ossis temporalis
- MeSH: D010579
- TA98: A02.1.06.002
- TA2: 642
- FMA: 52871

The petrous part of the temporal bone is pyramid-shaped and is wedged in at the base of the skull between the sphenoid and occipital bones. Directed medially, forward, and a little upward, it presents a base, an apex, three surfaces, and three angles, and houses in its interior the components of the inner ear. The petrous portion is among the most basal elements of the skull and forms part of the endocranium. Petrous comes from the Latin word petrosus, meaning "stone-like, hard". It is one of the densest bones in the body.

In other mammals, it is a separate bone, the petrosal bone, itself a fusion of the prootic, and opisthotic, and possibly epiotic.

The petrous bone is important for studies of ancient DNA from skeletal remains, as it tends to contain extremely well-preserved DNA.

== Base ==
The base is fused with the internal surfaces of the squamous, tympanic, and mastoid parts.

== Apex ==
The apex, which is rough and uneven, is received into the angular interval between the posterior border of the great wing of the sphenoid bone and the basilar part of the occipital bone; it presents the anterior or internal opening of the carotid canal, and forms the postero-lateral boundary of the foramen lacerum.

== Surfaces ==
=== Anterior surface ===
The anterior surface forms the posterior part of the middle cranial fossa of the base of the skull, and is continuous with the inner surface of the squamous portion, to which it is united by the petrosquamous suture, remains of which are distinct even at a late period of life. It is marked by depressions for the convolutions of the brain, and presents six notable points:

1. near the center, the arcuate eminence (eminentia arcuata), which indicates the location of the superior semicircular canal.
2. in front of and a little lateral to this eminence, a depression indicating the position of the tympanic cavity: Here, the layer of bone that separates the tympanic from the cranial cavity is extremely thin, and is known as the tegmen tympani
3. a shallow groove, sometimes double, leading lateralward and backward to an oblique opening, the hiatus for greater petrosal nerve, for the passage of the greater petrosal nerve and for the petrosal branch of the middle meningeal artery
4. lateral to the hiatus, a smaller opening, occasionally seen, for the passage of the lesser superficial petrosal nerve
5. near the apex of the bone, the termination of the carotid canal, the wall of which in this situation is deficient in front
6. above this canal the shallow trigeminal impression for the reception of the trigeminal ganglion.

=== Posterior surface ===
Posterior borders of the petrous part of the temporal bone in the posterior cranial fossa shown at (2) in blue

The posterior surface forms the anterior part of the posterior cranial fossa of the base of the skull, and is continuous with the inner surface of the mastoid portion.

Near the center is a large orifice, the internal acoustic opening, the size of which varies considerably; its margins are smooth and rounded, and it leads into the internal auditory meatus a short canal, about 1 cm. in length, which runs lateralward. It transmits the facial and acoustic nerves and the internal auditory branch of the basilar artery.

The lateral end of the canal is closed by a vertical plate, which is divided by a horizontal crest, the falciform crest, into two unequal portions.

Each portion is further subdivided by a vertical ridge into an anterior and a posterior part.

- In the portion beneath the falciform crest are three sets of foramina; these openings together with this central canal transmit the nerves to the cochlea.
  - one group, just below the posterior part of the crest, situated in the area cribrosa media, consists of several small openings for the nerves to the saccule;
  - below and behind this area is the foramen singulare, or opening for the nerve to the posterior semicircular duct;
  - in front of and below the first is the tractus spiralis foraminosus, consisting of a number of small spirally arranged openings, which encircle the canalis centralis cochleæ.
- The portion above the crista falciformis presents behind, the area cribrosa superior, pierced by a series of small openings, for the passage of the nerves to the utricle and the superior and lateral semicircular ducts, and, in front, the area facialis, with one large opening, the commencement of the canal for the facial nerve (aquæductus Fallopii).

Behind the internal acoustic meatus is a small slit almost hidden by a thin plate of bone, leading to a canal, the aquæductus vestibuli, which transmits the ductus endolymphaticus together with a small artery and vein.

Above and between these two openings is an irregular depression that lodges a process of the dura mater and transmits a small vein; in the infant, this depression is represented by a large fossa, the subarcuate fossa, which extends backward as a blind tunnel under the superior semicircular canal.

1. Falciform crest
2. Area facialis, with (2') internal opening of the facial canal
3. Ridge separating the area facialis from the area cribrosa superior
4. Area cribrosa superior, with (4') openings for nerve filaments
5. Anterior inferior cribriform area, with (5') the tractus spiralis foraminosus, and (5") the canalis centralis of the cochlea.
6. Ridge separating the tractus spiralis foraminosus from the area cribrosa media
7. Area cribrosa media, with (7') orifices for nerves to saccule
8. Foramen singulare.

=== Inferior surface ===
The inferior surface is rough and irregular, and forms part of the exterior of the base of the skull. It presents eleven points for examination:

1. near the apex is a rough surface, quadrilateral in form, which serves partly for the attachment of the Levator veli palatini and the cartilaginous portion of the auditory tube, and partly for connection with the basilar part of the occipital bone through the intervention of some dense fibrous tissue
2. behind this is the large circular aperture of the carotid canal, which ascends at first vertically, and then, making a bend, runs horizontally forward and medially; it transmits into the cranium the internal carotid artery, and the carotid plexus of nerves
3. medial to the opening for the carotid canal and close to its posterior border, in front of the jugular fossa, is a triangular depression; at the apex of this is a small opening, the aquæductus cochleæ, which lodges a tubular prolongation of the dura mater establishing a communication between the perilymphatic space and the subarachnoid space, and transmits a vein from the cochlea to join the internal jugular
4. behind these openings is a deep depression, the jugular fossa, of variable depth and size in different skulls; it lodges the bulb of the internal jugular vein
5. in the bony ridge dividing the carotid canal from the jugular fossa is the small inferior tympanic canaliculus for the passage of the tympanic branch of the glossopharyngeal nerve
6. in the lateral part of the jugular fossa is the mastoid canaliculus for the entrance of the auricular branch of the vagus nerve
7. behind the jugular fossa is a quadrilateral area, the jugular surface, covered with cartilage in the fresh state, and articulating with the jugular process of the occipital bone
8. extending backward from the carotid canal is the vaginal process, a sheath-like plate of bone, which divides behind into two laminæ; the lateral lamina is continuous with the tympanic part of the bone, the medial with the lateral margin of the jugular surface
9. between these laminæ is the styloid process, a sharp spine, about 2.5 cm. in length
10. between the styloid and mastoid processes is the stylomastoid foramen; it is the termination of the facial canal, and transmits the facial nerve and stylomastoid artery
11. situated between the tympanic portion and the mastoid process is the tympanomastoid fissure, for the exit of the auricular branch of the vagus nerve.

== Angles ==
The superior angle, the longest, is grooved for the superior petrosal sinus, and gives attachment to the tentorium cerebelli; at its medial extremity is a notch, in which the trigeminal nerve lies.

The posterior angle is intermediate in length between the superior and the anterior. Its medial half is marked by a sulcus, which forms, with a corresponding sulcus on the occipital bone, the channel for the inferior petrosal sinus. Its lateral half presents an excavation — the jugular fossa — which, with the jugular notch on the occipital, forms the jugular foramen; an eminence occasionally projects from the center of the fossa, and divides the foramen into two.

The anterior angle is divided into two parts—a lateral joined to the squamous part by a suture (petrosquamous), the remains of which are more or less distinct; a medial, free, which articulates with the spinous process of the sphenoid.

At the angle of junction of the petrous and the squamous parts are two canals, one above the other, and separated by a thin plate of bone, the septum canalis musculotubarii; both canals lead into the tympanic cavity.

- The upper one (semicanalis m. tensoris tympani) transmits the tensor tympani.
- the lower one (semicanalis tubae auditivae) forms the bony part of the auditory tube.

== Petrous bone in ancient DNA studies ==
In ancient DNA studies, scientists extract and sequence DNA from ancient skeletal remains of humans and other species. In many cases the DNA is highly degraded, and contaminated by DNA from soil microbes. In 2015 it was found that the petrous bone has remarkably well-preserved DNA. A 2017 study comparing DNA from different skeletal sites concluded that "The inner part of petrous bones and the cementum layer in teeth roots are currently recognized as the best substrates for (ancient DNA) research ... Both substrates display significantly higher endogenous DNA content (average of 16.4% and 40.0% for teeth and petrous bones, respectively) than parietal skull bone (average of 2.2%)."

Consequently, petrous bones are now the most widely-used skeletal site for the study of ancient DNA.

== Use in confirmation of death ==
The petrous part of the temporal bone was used to identify the death of Shani Louk months after the October 7 attacks. A fragment of her skull was identified as this part, which indicated she had died.

== Additional images ==
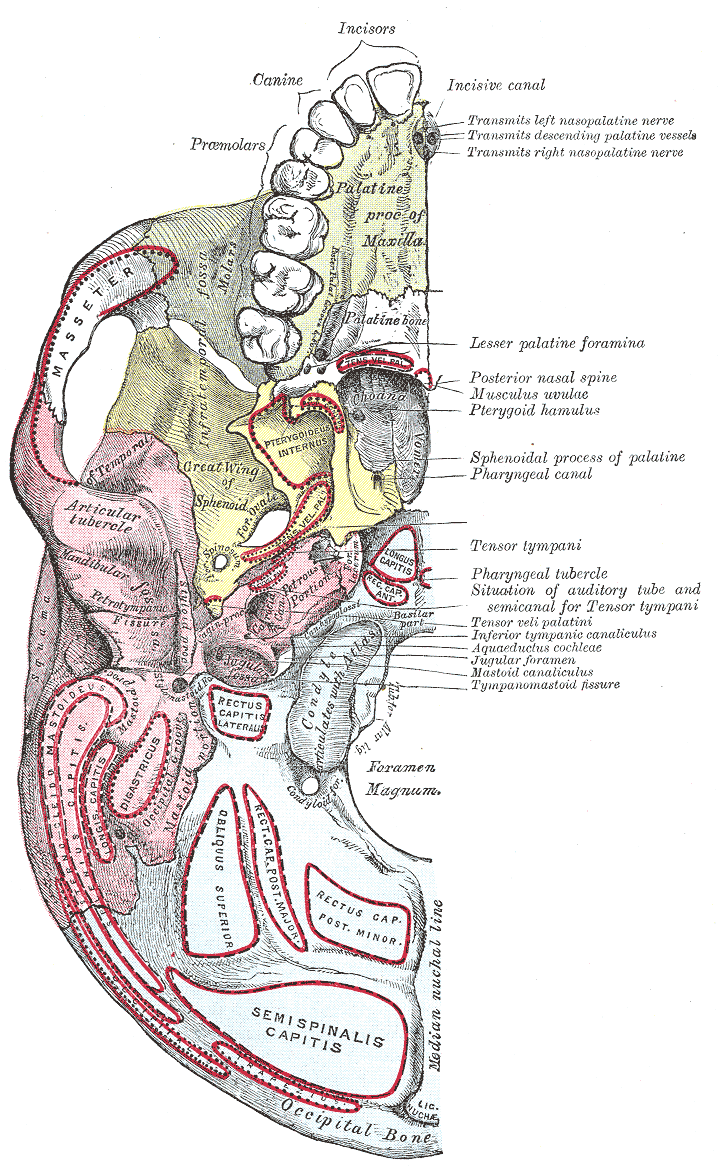
Base of skull. Inferior surface.

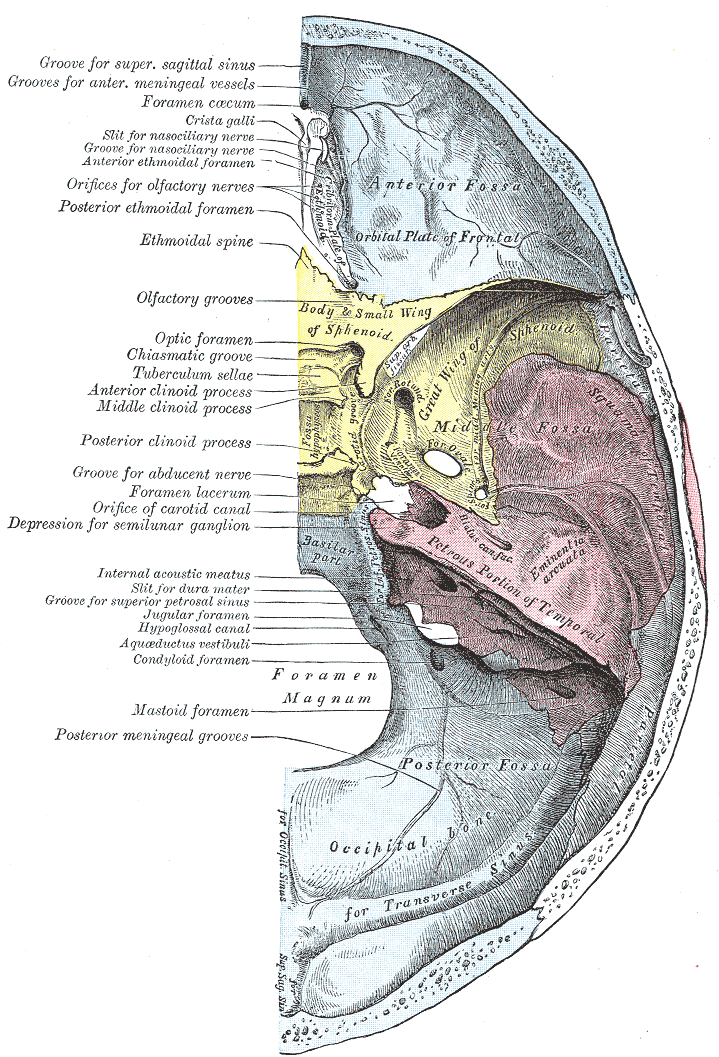
Base of the skull. Upper surface.

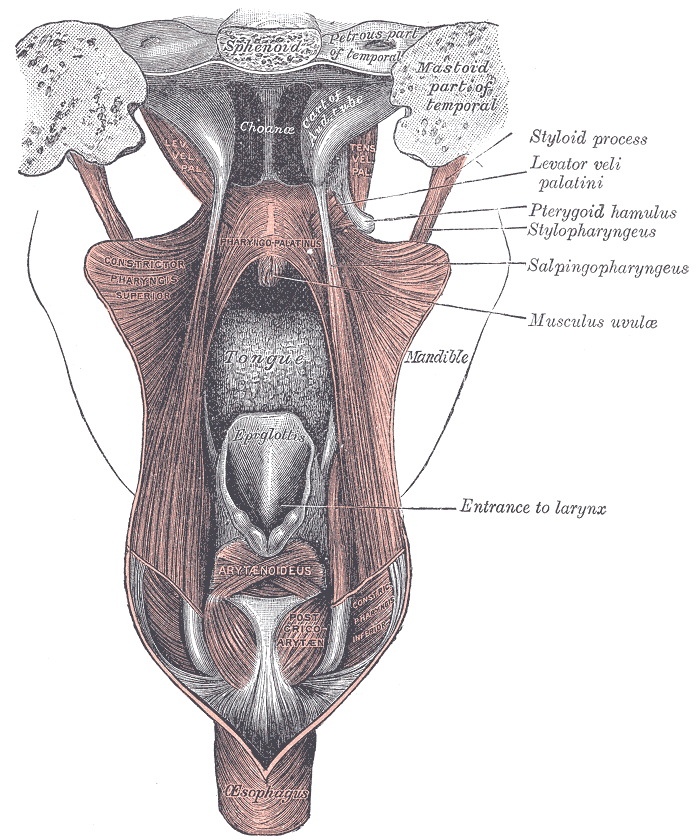
Dissection of the muscles of the palate from behind.

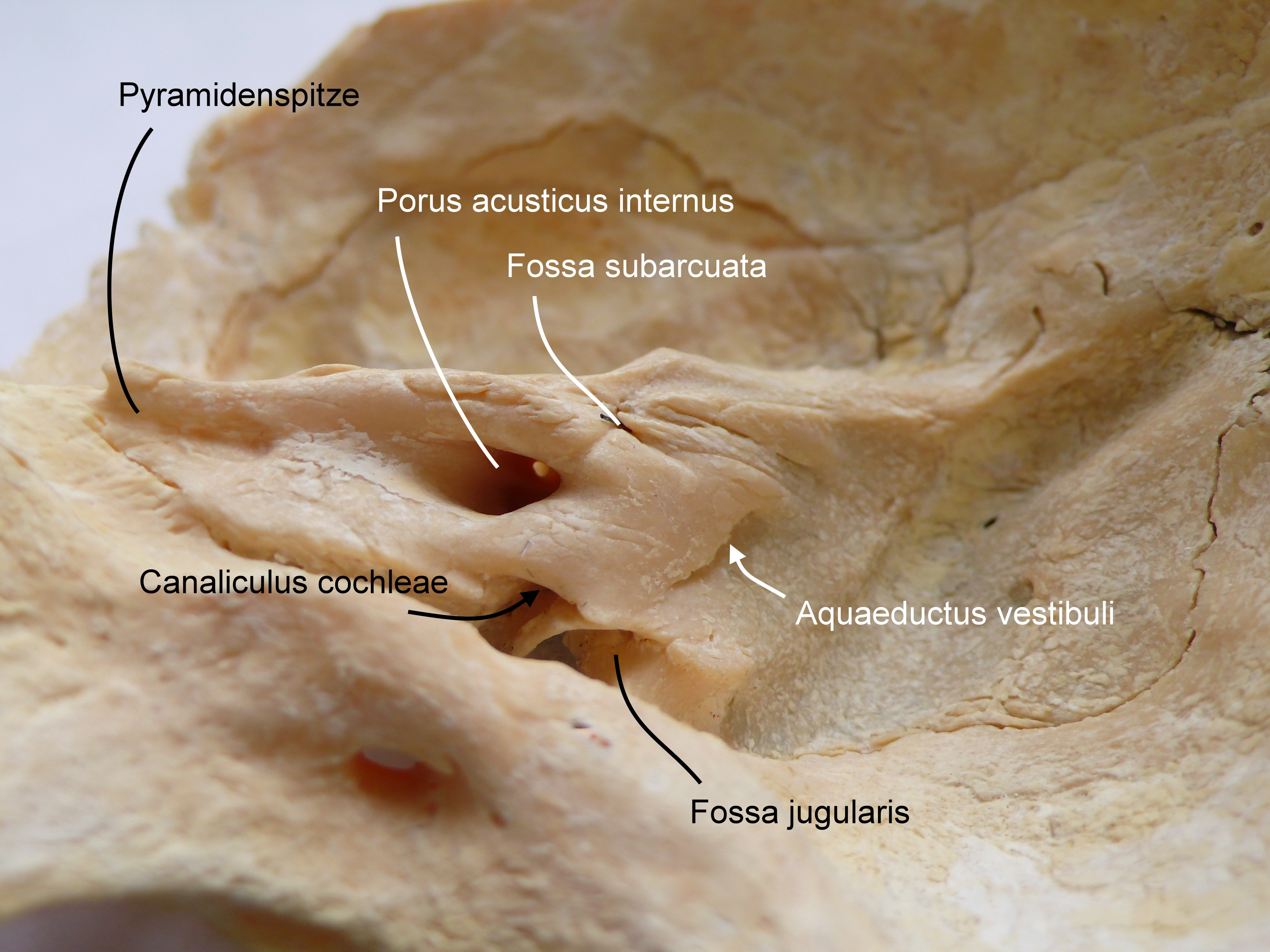
Temporal bone

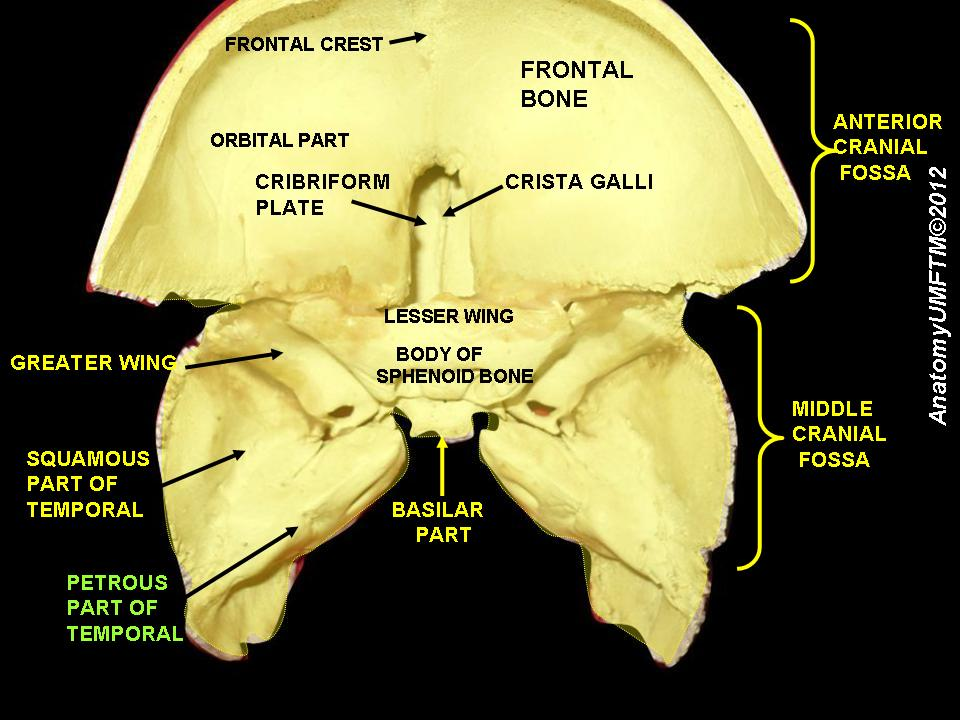
Bones of the front of the skull, viewed from behind (interior surface). The petrous part of the temporal is labeled in the lower left.

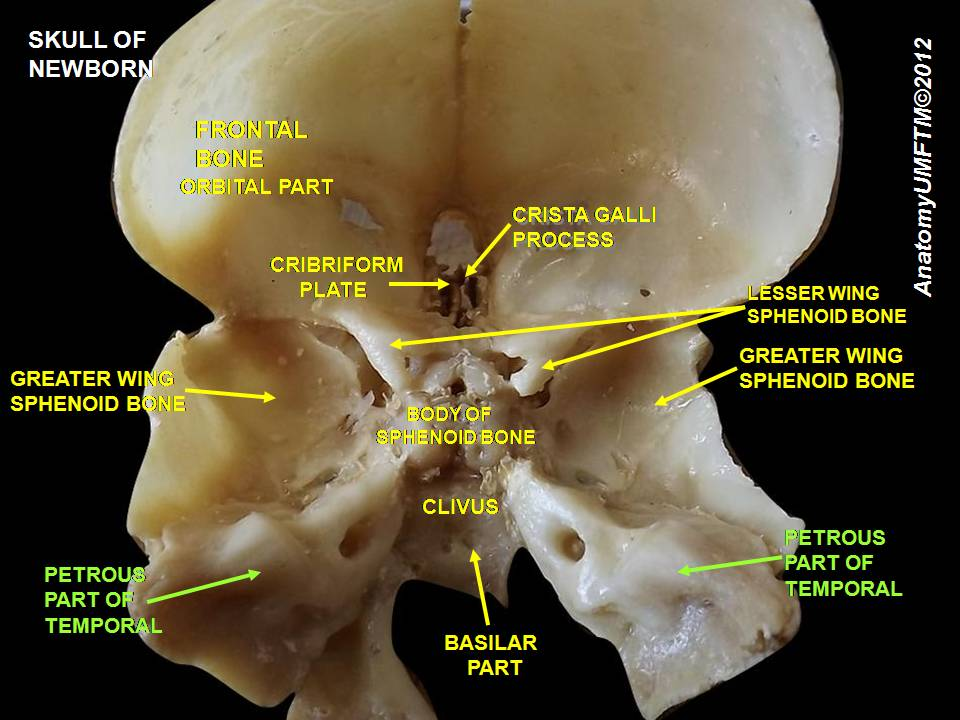
Another view of the bones of the front of the skull, viewed from behind, with the petrous part of the temporal labeled bilaterally.

== See also ==
- Internal carotid artery#C2: Petrous segment
