= Meningeal branch of vagus nerve =

Branch of the vagus nerve

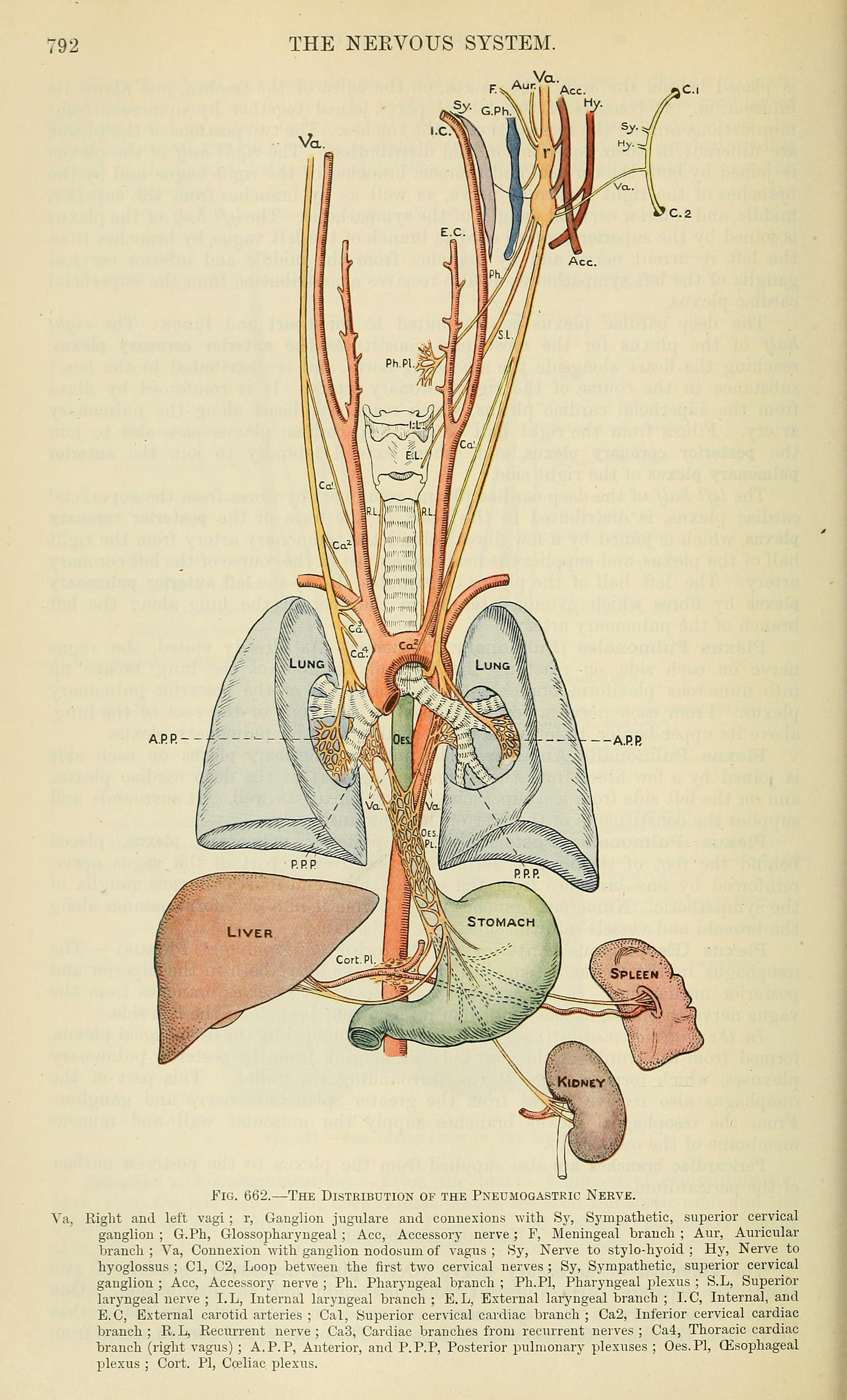
- Meningeal branch labeled as "F." arising from superior ganglion (top right).

Details
- From: superior ganglion of vagus nerve
- Innervates: dura mater of posterior cranial fossa

Identifiers
- Latin: ramus meningeus nervi vagi
- TA98: A14.2.01.155
- TA2: 6334
- FMA: 6231

The meningeal branch of the vagus nerve is a sensory branch of the vagus nerve that supplies part of the cranial meninges. It emerges from the superior ganglion and initially follows the vagus nerve before backtracking through the jugular foramen to re-enter the cranium. Within the skull, it spreads out to provide sensory innervation to the dura mater of the posterior cranial fossa. The neuron cell bodies of this branch reside in the superior ganglion, and its sensory fibers relay general somatic sensation from the dura to the spinal nucleus of the trigeminal nerve in the brainstem. This nerve is clinically relevant in conditions involving meningeal irritation and in surgical procedures affecting structures near the jugular foramen and posterior cranial fossa.
