= Enlarged vestibular aqueduct =

Human disease

- Other names: Enlarged vestibular aqueduct, Dilated vestibular aqueduct or Widened vestibular aqueduct
- Interior of right osseous labyrinth

Large vestibular aqueduct is a structural deformity of the inner ear. Enlargement of this duct is one of the most common inner ear deformities and is commonly associated with hearing loss during childhood. The term was first discovered in 1791 by Mondini when he was completing a temporal bone dissection. It was then defined by Valvassori and Clemis as a vestibular aqueduct that is greater than or equal to 2.0 mm at the operculum and/or greater than or equal to 1.0 mm at the midpoint. Some use the term enlarged vestibular aqueduct syndrome, but this is felt by others to be erroneous as it is a clinical finding which can occur in several syndromes.

== Symptoms ==
Although large vestibular aqueducts are a congenital condition, hearing loss may not be present from birth. Age of diagnosis ranges from infancy to adulthood, and symptoms include fluctuating and sometimes progressive sensorineural hearing loss and disequilibrium. It is possible that a small portion of those with large vestibular aqueducts will not exhibit auditory symptoms such as hearing loss. While this is uncommon, hearing loss can progress later in life, especially after head trauma. Hearing loss can be unilateral or bilateral and can be sensorineural, conductive, or mixed. Vestibular symptoms, such as vertigo and imbalance, occur in adult patients 45% of the time.

== Pathology ==
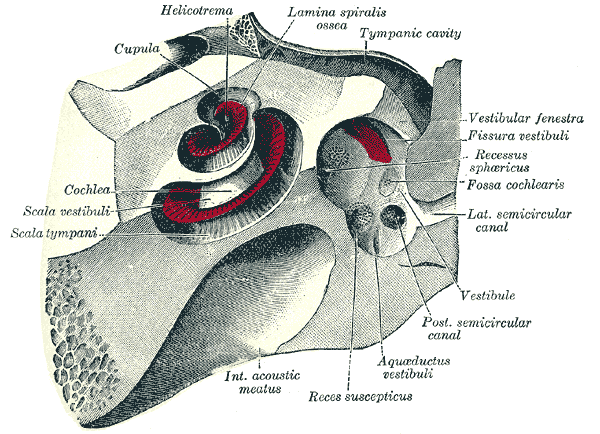
The cochlea and vestibule, viewed from above. (Vestibular aqueduct labeled at bottom right.)

The vestibular aqueduct acts as a canal between the inner ear and the cranial cavity. Running through it is a tube called the endolymphatic duct, which normally carries a fluid called endolymph from the inner ear to the endolymphatic sac in the cranial cavity. When the endolymphatic duct and sac are larger than normal, as is the case in large vestibular aqueduct syndrome, endolymph is allowed to travel back from the endolymphatic sac into the inner ear. This often results in fluctuations in hearing levels. Enlarged vestibular aqueducts are caused by mutations in gene SLC26A4, which is also associated with Pendred syndrome and non-syndromic recessive deafness. Enlarged vestibular aqueducts often occur with other inner ear development problems, such as cochlear deformities. Enlarged vestibular aqueducts are part of the classic Mondini deformity. Enlarged vestibular aqueducts with enlarged endolymphatic sacs occur in Pendred syndrome, which is caused by a defect on chromosome 7q31. Enlarged vestibular aqueducts can also occur in branchio-oto-renal syndrome, CHARGE syndrome and renal tubular acidosis.

Enlarged vestibular aqueducts can be bilateral or unilateral.

Hearing loss caused by large vestibular aqueduct syndrome is not inevitable, although people with the syndrome are at a much higher risk of developing hearing loss than the general population. Hearing loss is very likely.

== Diagnosis ==
Enlarged vestibular aqueducts are commonly picked up after newborn hearing screen when a child is identified as having a hearing loss. The hearing loss is commonly mixed and can be of any degree when first identified. The conductive component is due to a third window effect caused by the widened vestibular aqueduct. During an audiologic assessment, an air-bone gap in the low frequencies can occur due to the enlarged vestibular aqueduct acting as a third mobile window. Hearing loss in the contralateral ear to the enlarged vestibular aqueduct can also occur due to the chemical composition on both sides. Torticollis has also been found to be an indicator of an enlarged vestibular aqueduct in children. Identification of the enlarged vestibular aqueduct in a child is usually by MRI scan which identifies the fluid within the endolymphatic duct and sac. CT scan may be needed to see the vestibular aqueduct clearly. In adults, CT scan may be the first investigation. In order to diagnose the cause of the enlarged vestibular aqueduct, the physician will need a detailed family history, full examination to include vestibular examination and, if a bilateral finding, molecular genetic testing as appropriate. With unilateral enlarged vestibular aqueducts, molecular genetic testing is currently not recommended.

== Management ==
There is no treatment to correct an enlarged vestibular aqueduct. Any hearing loss will need management with amplification and support in education and at work. If the hearing loss becomes severe to profound, cochlear implants can be of significant value. Vestibular disturbance is usually short-lived and associated with head trauma, but significant vestibular hypofunction may require rehabilitation.

People with enlarged vestibular aqueducts are advised to avoid head trauma where possible. This usually means avoiding contact sports such as football, boxing, rugby, horse riding, trampolining and other sports where head injury may occur. Some have symptoms when flying and should limit these activities if affected.
