= Unipolar neuron =

Classification based upon the number of poles

- 1: Unipolar 2: Bipolar 3: Multipolar 4: Pseudounipolar

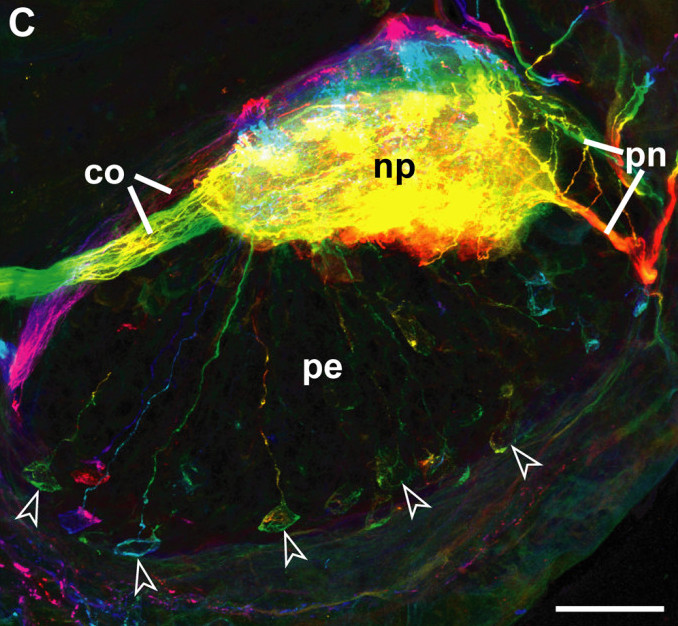
- Example of several unipolar neurons from a nerve ganglion of a velvet worm (a primitive arthropod). The neurons were stained for serotonin immunoreactivity, and photographed using a confocal microscope, with multiple images overlaid and color-coded according to depth. Arrows mark the peripherally located cell bodies of several neurons, whose neurites extend into the central neuropil (np), where their complex ramifications are indiscernible. Scale bar: 50 micrometres.

Details

Identifiers
- Latin: neuron unipolare
- TH: H2.00.06.1.00046
- FMA: 67278

A unipolar neuron is a neuron in which only one process, called a neurite, extends from the cell body. The neurite then branches to form dendritic and axonal processes. Most neurons in the central nervous systems of invertebrates, including insects, are unipolar. The cell bodies of invertebrate unipolar neurons are often located around the edges of the neuropil, in the so-called cell-body rind.

Most neurons in the central nervous systems of vertebrates, including mammals, are multipolar. In multipolar neurons, multiple processes extend from the cell body including dendrites and axons. Some neurons in the vertebrate brain have a unipolar morphology: a notable example is the unipolar brush cell, found in the cerebellum and granule region of the dorsal cochlear nucleus.

A third morphological class, bipolar neurons, extend just one axon and dendritic process from the cell body. Examples of bipolar neurons include most invertebrate sensory neurons and bipolar cells of the vertebrate retina.

Some vertebrate sensory neurons are classified as pseudounipolar. Pseudounipolar neurons initially develop as bipolar cells, but at some point the two processes that extend from the cell body fuse to form a single neurite. The pseudounipolar neuron's axon then splits into two branches. Sensory neurons with cell bodies in the dorsal root ganglia of the vertebrate spinal cord are pseudo-unipolar: one branch projects to the periphery (to sensory receptors in the skin, joints, and muscle), the other to the spinal cord.
