= Aditus =

An aditus is the opening to some interior space or cavity. It may refer to:

- Aditus to mastoid antrum, in the ear
- Laryngeal aditus, the opening that connects the pharynx and the larynx
- Omental foramen or aditus, in the abdomen
