= Mastoiditis =

Middle ear disease

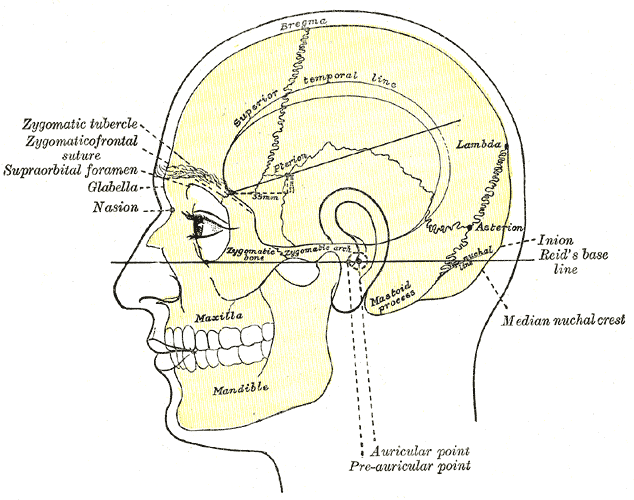
- Side view of head, showing surface relations of bones. (Mastoid process labeled near center.)
- Specialty: Otorhinolaryngology

Mastoiditis is the result of an infection that extends to the air cells of the skull behind the ear. Specifically, it is an inflammation of the mucosal lining of the mastoid antrum and mastoid air cell system inside the mastoid process. The mastoid process is the portion of the temporal bone of the skull that is behind the ear. The mastoid process contains open, air-containing spaces. Mastoiditis is usually caused by untreated acute otitis media (middle ear infection) and used to be a leading cause of child mortality. With the development of antibiotics, however, mastoiditis has become quite rare in developed countries where surgical treatment is now much less frequent and more conservative, unlike former times.

There is no evidence that the drop in antibiotic prescribing for otitis media has increased the incidence of mastoiditis, raising the possibility that the drop in reported cases is due to a confounding factor such as childhood immunizations against Haemophilus and Streptococcus. Untreated, the infection can spread to surrounding structures, including the brain, causing serious complications. While the use of antibiotics has reduced the incidence of mastoiditis, the risk of masked mastoiditis, a subclinical infection without the typical findings of mastoiditis has increased with the inappropriate use of antibiotics and the emergence of multidrug-resistant bacteria.

== Signs and symptoms ==
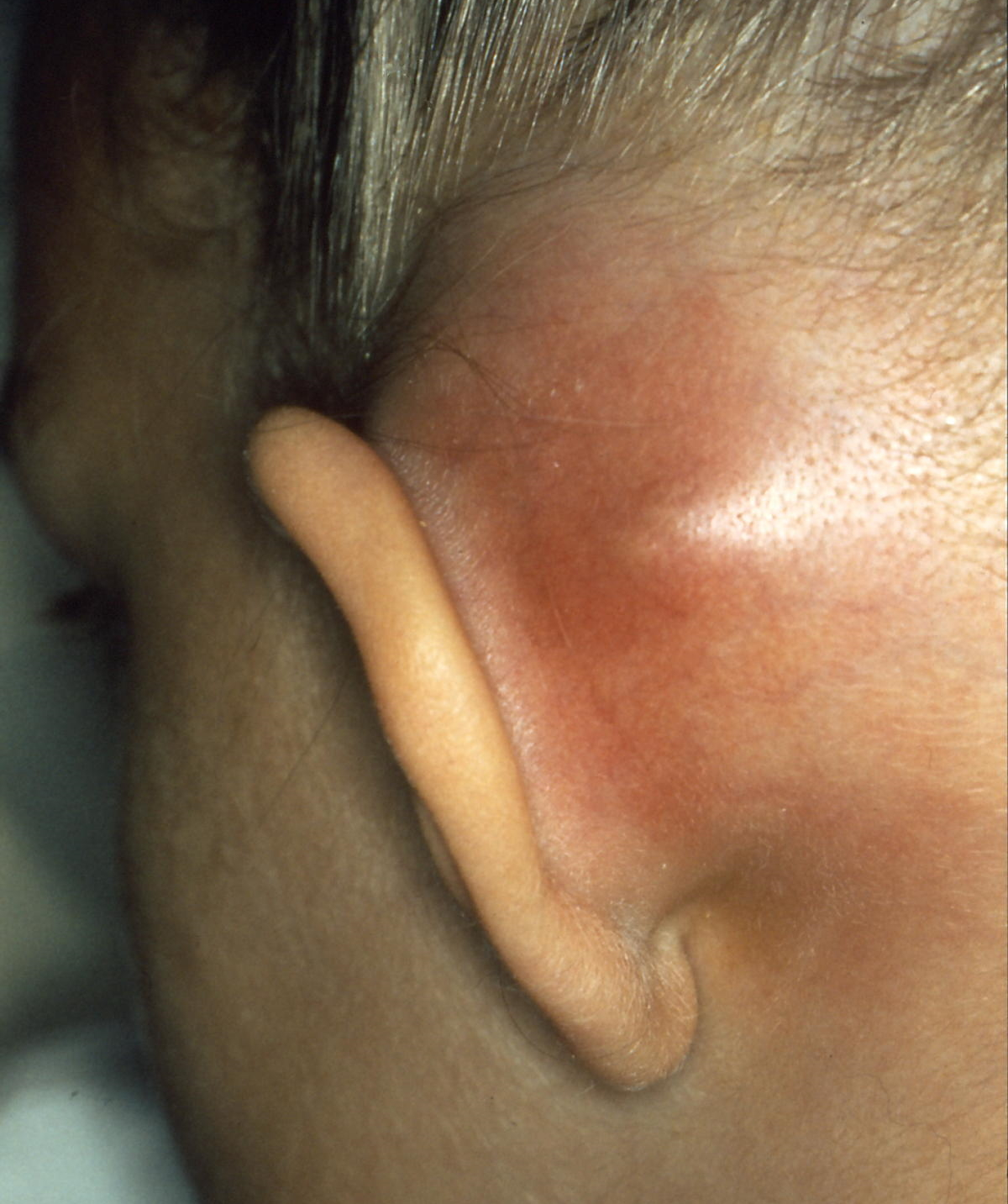
Mastoiditis with subperiostal abscess

Some common symptoms and signs of mastoiditis include pain, tenderness, and swelling in the mastoid region. There may be ear pain (otalgia), and the ear or mastoid region may be red (erythematous). Fever or headaches may also be present. Infants usually show nonspecific symptoms, including anorexia, diarrhea, or irritability. Drainage from the ear occurs in more serious cases, often manifesting as brown discharge on the pillowcase upon waking.

== Pathophysiology ==
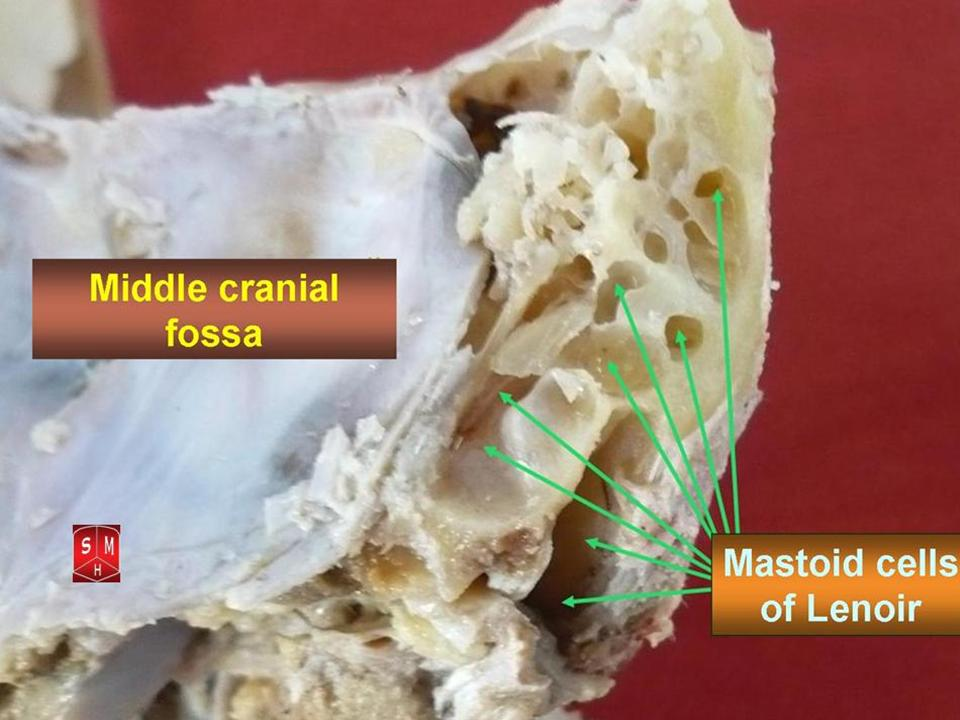
Mastoid cells of Lenoir

The pathophysiology of mastoiditis is straightforward: bacteria spread from the middle ear to the mastoid air cells, where the inflammation causes damage to the bony structures. Streptococcus pneumoniae, Streptococcus pyogenes, Staphylococcus aureus, Haemophilus influenzae, and Moraxella catarrhalis are the most common organisms recovered in acute mastoiditis. Organisms that are rarely found are Pseudomonas aeruginosa and other Gram-negative aerobic bacilli, and anaerobic bacteria. P. aeruginosa, Enterobacteriaceae, S. aureus and anaerobic bacteria (Prevotella, Bacteroides, Fusobacterium, and Peptostreptococcus spp.) are the most common isolates in chronic mastoiditis. Rarely, Mycobacterium species can also cause the infection. Some mastoiditis is caused by cholesteatoma, which is a sac of keratinizing squamous epithelium in the middle ear that usually results from repeated middle-ear infections. If left untreated, the cholesteatoma can erode into the mastoid process, producing mastoiditis, as well as other complications.

== Diagnosis ==
CT scan: Otitis media (simple arrow) and mastoiditis (double arrow) of the right side (left side in image). The external auditory canal is partially occupied by suppuration (triple arrow). 44-year-old woman.

The diagnosis of mastoiditis is clinical—based on the medical history and physical examination. Imaging studies provide additional information; The standard method of diagnosis is via MRI scan although a CT scan is a common alternative as it gives a clearer and more useful image to see how close the damage may have gotten to the brain and facial nerves. Planar (2-D) X-rays are not as useful. If there is drainage, it is often sent for culture, although this will often be negative if the patient has begun taking antibiotics. Exploratory surgery is often used as a last resort method of diagnosis to see the mastoid and surrounding areas.

== Treatment ==
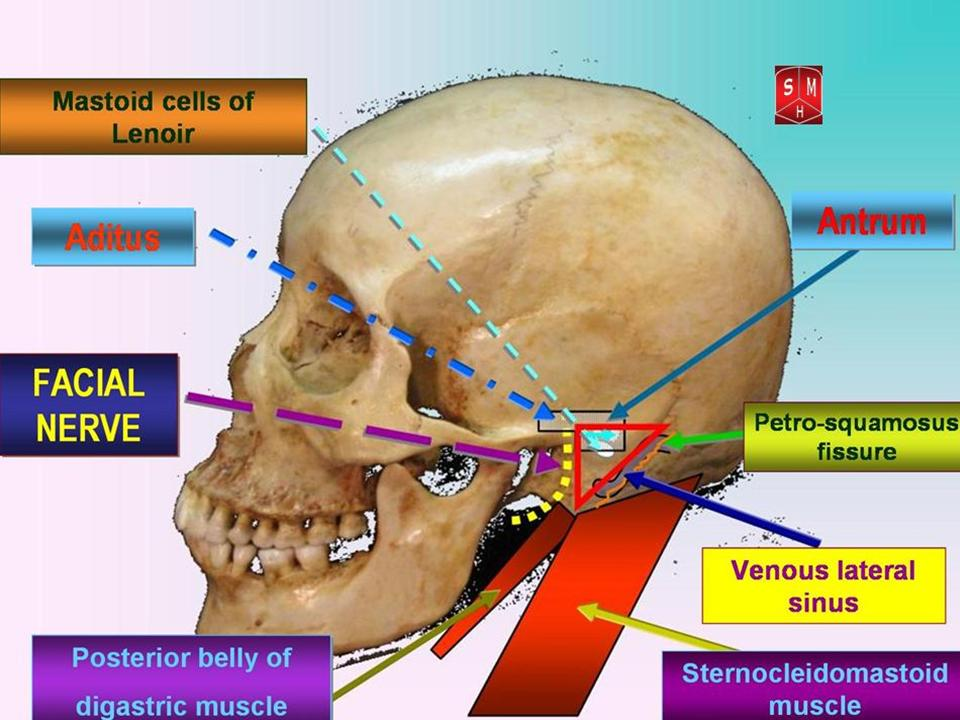
Attack triangle in mastoidectomies

If ear infections are treated in a reasonable amount of time, the antibiotics will usually cure the infection and prevent its spread. For this reason, mastoiditis is rare in developed countries. Most ear infections occur in infants as the eustachian tubes are not fully developed and don't drain readily.

In all developed countries with up-to-date modern healthcare the primary treatment for mastoiditis is administration of intravenous antibiotics. Initially, broad-spectrum antibiotics are given, such as ceftriaxone. As culture results become available, treatment can be switched to more specific antibiotics directed at the eradication of the recovered aerobic and anaerobic bacteria. Long-term antibiotics may be necessary to completely eradicate the infection. If the condition does not quickly improve with antibiotics, surgical procedures may be performed (while continuing the medication). The most common procedure is a myringotomy, a small incision in the tympanic membrane (eardrum), or the insertion of a tympanostomy tube into the eardrum. These serve to drain the pus from the middle ear, helping to treat the infection. The tube is extruded spontaneously after a few weeks to months, and the incision heals naturally. If there are complications, or the mastoiditis does not respond to the above treatments, it may be necessary to perform a mastoidectomy: a procedure in which a portion of the bone is removed and the infection drained.

== Prognosis ==
With prompt treatment, it is possible to cure mastoiditis. Seeking medical care early is important. However, it is difficult for antibiotics to penetrate to the interior of the mastoid process and so it may not be easy to cure the infection; it also may recur. Mastoiditis has many possible complications, all connected to the infection spreading to surrounding structures. Hearing loss is likely, or inflammation of the labyrinth of the inner ear (labyrinthitis) may occur, producing vertigo, and an ear ringing may develop along with the hearing loss, making it more difficult to communicate. The infection may also spread to the facial nerve (cranial nerve VII), causing facial-nerve palsy, producing weakness or paralysis of some muscles of facial expression, on the same side of the face. Other complications include Bezold's abscess, an abscess (a collection of pus surrounded by inflamed tissue) behind the sternocleidomastoid muscle in the neck, or a subperiosteal abscess, between the periosteum and mastoid bone (resulting in the typical appearance of a protruding ear). Serious complications result if the infection spreads to the brain. These include meningitis (inflammation of the protective membranes surrounding the brain), epidural abscess (abscess between the skull and outer membrane of the brain), dural venous thrombophlebitis (inflammation of the venous structures of the brain), or brain abscess.

== Epidemiology ==
In the United States and other developed countries, the incidence of mastoiditis is quite low, around 0.004%, although it is higher in developing countries. The condition most commonly affects children aged from two to thirteen months, when ear infections most commonly occur. Males and females are equally affected.

== See also ==
- Pete Browning, a 19th-century Major League Baseball hitting star plagued by chronic mastoiditis
