= Endolymphatic duct =

Canal in the inner ear

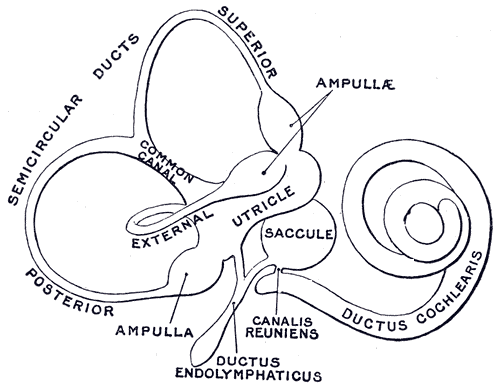
- The membranous labyrinth. (Ductus endolymphaticus labeled at bottom center.)

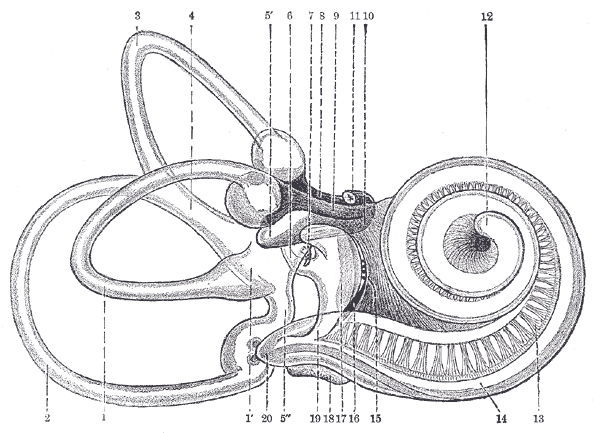
- Endolymphatic duct is #6, and is labeled at top center.

Details

Identifiers
- Latin: ductus endolymphaticus
- MeSH: D004711
- TA98: A15.3.03.079
- TA2: 7006
- FMA: 61246

In anatomy, the endolymphatic duct is a structure in the inner ear. It is a canal that comes out of the posterior wall of the saccule, then is joined by the utriculosaccular duct, and then passes along the vestibular aqueduct, before it ends up at the endolymphatic sac on the posterior surface of the petrous portion of the temporal bone, where it is in contact with the dura mater.

Disorders of the endolymphatic duct include Meniere's Disease and enlarged vestibular aqueduct.

== Additional images ==
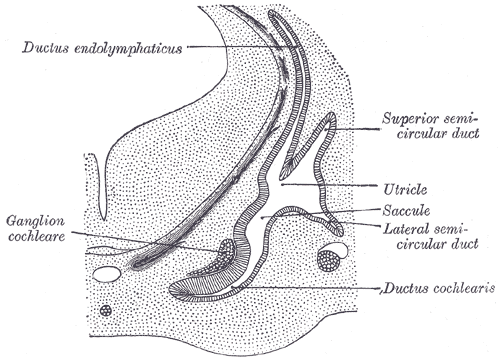
Transverse section through head of fetal sheep, in the region of the labyrinth. X 30.

Transverse section of a human semicircular canal and duct
