= Stylomastoid artery =

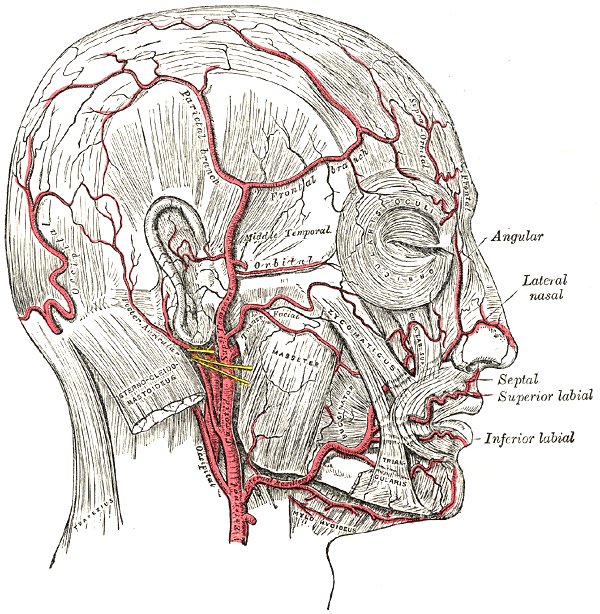
- The arteries of the face and scalp.

Details
- Source: Posterior auricular artery
- Supplies: Tympanic cavity, tympanic antrum, mastoid cells, semicircular canals

Identifiers
- Latin: arteria stylomastoidea
- TA98: A12.2.05.038
- TA2: 4406
- FMA: 49628

The stylomastoid artery enters the stylomastoid foramen and supplies the tympanic cavity, the tympanic antrum and mastoid cells, and the semicircular canals. It is a branch of the posterior auricular artery, and thus part of the external carotid arterial system.

In the young subject, a branch from this vessel forms, with the anterior tympanic artery from the internal maxillary, a vascular circle, which surrounds the tympanic membrane, and from which delicate vessels ramify on that membrane.

It anastomoses with the superficial petrosal branch of the middle meningeal artery by a twig which enters the hiatus canalis facialis.
