= Utriculosaccular duct =

Part of the inner ear

The utriculosaccular duct is a part of the membranous labyrinth of the inner ear which connects the two parts of the vestibule, the utricle and the saccule. It continues to the endolymphatic duct and ends in the endolymphatic sac.

== Importance ==
This structure plays an important role as a duct that serves as a conduit for endolymph between these structures, maintaining proper fluid dynamics essential for vestibular function. Specifically because the utriculosaccular duct carries the endolymphatic fluid to the endolymphatic sac, where it is drained. This system of the endolymphatic fluid prevents excessive fluid build-up in the inner ear, a condition also known as endolymphatic hydrops, which is associated with Ménière´s disease and others vestibular disorders. Further evidence for this physiological drainage mechanism can be seen in contrast-enhanced inner ear MRI, where the post-contrast visibility of endolymphatic sac and duct is inversely correlated to the amount of endolymphatic hydrops, independent of clinical diagnosis.
