= Pseudounipolar neuron =

Type of neuron

- 1: Pseudounipolar neuron; 2: Bipolar neuron

Details
- System: Nervous system

Identifiers
- Latin: neuron pseudounipolare
- TH: H2.00.06.1.00047

A pseudounipolar neuron is a type of neuron which has one extension from its cell body. This type of neuron contains an axon that has split into two branches. They develop embryologically as bipolar in shape, and are thus termed pseudounipolar instead of unipolar.

== Structure ==
A pseudounipolar neuron has one axon that projects from the cell body for relatively a very short distance, before splitting into two branches. Pseudounipolar neurons are sensory neurons that have no dendrites, the branched axon serving both functions. The peripheral branch extends from the cell body to organs in the periphery including skin, joints and muscles, and the central branch extends from the cell body to the spinal cord.

=== In the dorsal root ganglia ===
The cell body of a pseudounipolar neuron is located within a dorsal root ganglion. The axon leaves the cell body (and out of the dorsal root ganglion) into the dorsal root, where it splits into two branches. The central branch goes to the dorsal columns of the spinal cord, where it forms synapses with other neurons. The peripheral branch travels through the distal dorsal root into the spinal nerve all the way until skin, joint, and muscle.

=== In most sensory ganglia of cranial nerves ===
Pseudounipolar neurons are found in the sensory ganglia of most cranial nerves.

Specifically the:

- trigeminal ganglion
- geniculate ganglion
- superior ganglion of the glossopharyngeal nerve
- inferior ganglion of the glossopharyngeal nerve
- superior ganglion of the vagus nerve
- inferior ganglion of the vagus nerve

Pseudounipolar neurons in cranial nerve sensory ganglia synapse in the main sensory trigeminal nucleus, spinal trigeminal nucleus or solitary nucleus.

While the vestibulocochlear nerve has two ganglia associated with it (spiral ganglion and vestibular ganglion), both contain bipolar neurons, not pseudounipolar.

=== In the mesencephalic nucleus ===
The mesencephalic nucleus is made up of pseudounipolar neurons which migrated into the brainstem during embryological development. It is the only location in the central nervous system where the cell bodies of pseudounipolar neurons are found.

== Function ==
A neuron that has one extension that branches off the cell body which splits into two opposite branches, and has no true dendrites.

All pseudounipolar neurons are sensory neurons. The ones found in the dorsal root ganglia, and majority of those in cranial nerve sensory ganglia carry information about touch, vibration, proprioception, pain and temperature.

Pseudounipolar neurons in the geniculate ganglion, inferior ganglion of the glossopharyngeal nerve and inferior ganglion of the vagus nerve also carry information about taste from taste buds.

Some of the pseudounipolar neurons in the inferior ganglion of the glossopharyngeal nerve carry information from the carotid body and carotid sinus.

The pseudounipolar neurons in the mesencephalic nucleus carry proprioceptive information from the muscle of mastication.

== See also ==
- Bipolar neuron
- Multipolar neuron
- Unipolar neuron
