= Aditus to mastoid antrum =

Structure in middle ear anatomy

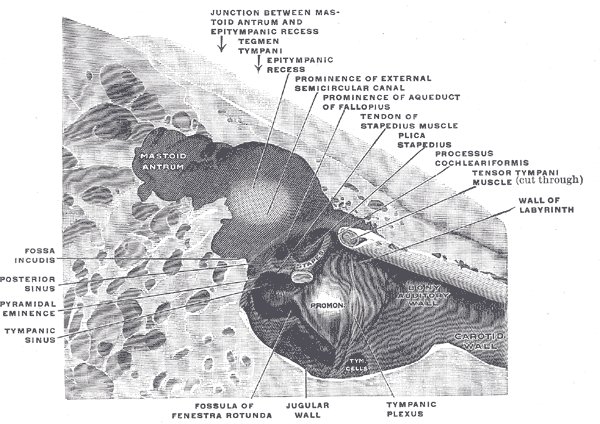
- The medial wall and part of the posterior and anterior walls of the right tympanic cavity, side view.

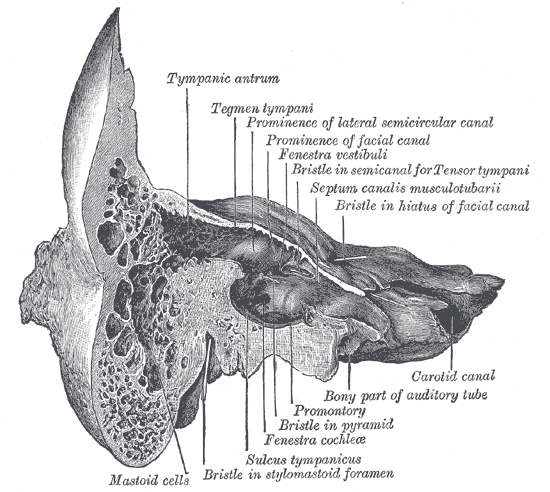
- Coronal section of right temporal bone

Details

Identifiers
- Latin: aditus ad antrum mastoideum
- TA98: A15.3.02.021
- TA2: 6910
- FMA: 56797

The aditus to mastoid antrum (otomastoid foramen) is a large, irregular opening upon the posterior wall of the tympanic cavity by which the mastoid antrum (situated posteriorly) communicates with the epitympanic recess of the tympanic cavity (situated anteriorly). The walls of the antrum are lined by mucosa which is continuous with that lining the mastoid cells and tympanic cavity.

The medial wall of the aditus features a ridge created by the underlying facial canal, and a bulge created by the underlying ampulla of the lateral semicircular canal. The short limb of incus is lodged in a shallow fossa upon the posterior wall of the tympanic cavity just inferior to the aditus. The pyramidal eminence is situated inferior to the aditus.

== See also ==
- Aditus
