= Bipolar neuron =

Neuron with only one axon and one dendrite

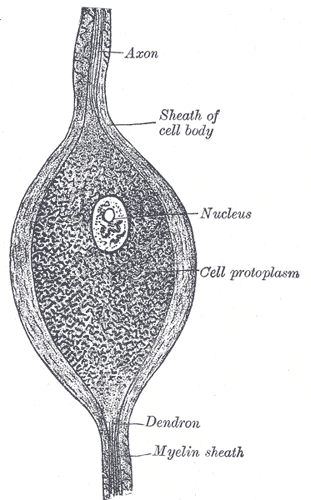
- Bipolar nerve cell from the spinal ganglion of the pike.

Details

Identifiers
- Latin: neuron bipolare
- TH: H2.00.06.1.00050
- FMA: 67282

A bipolar neuron, or bipolar cell, is a type of neuron characterized by having both an axon and a dendrite extending from the soma (cell body) in opposite directions. These neurons are predominantly found in the retina and olfactory system. The embryological period encompassing weeks seven through eight marks the commencement of bipolar neuron development.

Many bipolar cells are specialized sensory neurons (afferent neurons) for the transmission of sense. As such, they are part of the sensory pathways for smell, sight, taste, hearing, touch, balance and proprioception. The other shape classifications of neurons include unipolar, pseudounipolar and multipolar. During embryonic development, pseudounipolar neurons begin as bipolar in shape but become pseudounipolar as they mature.

Common examples are the retina bipolar cell, the spiral ganglion and vestibular ganglion of the vestibulocochlear nerve (cranial nerve VIII), the extensive use of bipolar cells to transmit efferent (motor) signals to control muscles and olfactory receptor neurons in the olfactory epithelium for smell (axons form the olfactory nerve).

== In the retina ==
Bipolar neurons, classified as second-order retinal neurons, play a crucial role in translating responses to light into a neural code for vision. Often found in the retina, bipolar cells are crucial as they serve as both direct and indirect cell pathways. The specific location of the bipolar cells allow them to facilitate the passage of signals from where they start in the receptors to where they arrive at the amacrine and ganglion cells. Bipolar cells in the retina are also unusual in that they do not fire impulses like the other cells found within the nervous system. Rather, they pass the information by graded signal changes. Bipolar cells convey impulses from photoreceptors (rods and cones) to ganglion cells, which in turn transport the visual signals to the brain through the optic nerve. Bipolar cells come in two varieties, having either an on-center or an off-center receptive field, each with a surround of the opposite sign. The off-center bipolar cells have excitatory synaptic connections with the photoreceptors, which fire continuously in the dark and are hyperpolarized (suppressed) by light. The excitatory synapses thus convey a suppressive signal to the off-center bipolar cells. On-center bipolar cells have inhibitory synapses with the photoreceptors and therefore are excited by light and suppressed in the dark. On-bipolar cells of the retina have been rendered light-responsive as a strategy for sight restoration using photopharmacology. This approach is based on photoswitchable small molecule agonist-potentiators of mGlu_{6} receptor proteins, which are expressed exclusively in on-bipolar neurons of the retina. These compounds restore visually guided behavior in mouse models of retinitis pigmentosa and macular degeneration, and restore visual acuity in blinded zebrafish.

== In the vestibular nerve ==
Bipolar neurons exist within the vestibular nerve as it is responsible for special sensory sensations including hearing, equilibrium and motion detection. The majority of the bipolar neurons belonging to the vestibular nerve exist within the vestibular ganglion with axons extending into the maculae of utricle and saccule as well as into the ampullae of the semicircular canals.

== In the spinal ganglia ==
Bipolar cells are also found in the spinal ganglia, when the cells are in an embryonic condition.

Sometimes the extensions, also called processes, come off from opposite poles of the cell, and the cell then assumes a spindle shape.

In some cases where two fibers are apparently connected with a cell, one of the fibers is really derived from an adjoining nerve cell and is passing to end in a ramification around the ganglion cell, or, again, it may be coiled helically around the nerve process which is issuing from the cell.

== In the cerebral cortex ==
Von Economo neurons, also known as spindle neurons, found in a few select parts of the cerebral cortex of apes and some other intelligent animals, possess a single axon and dendrite and as such have been described as bipolar.
