= Vincenz Fohmann =

German anatomist

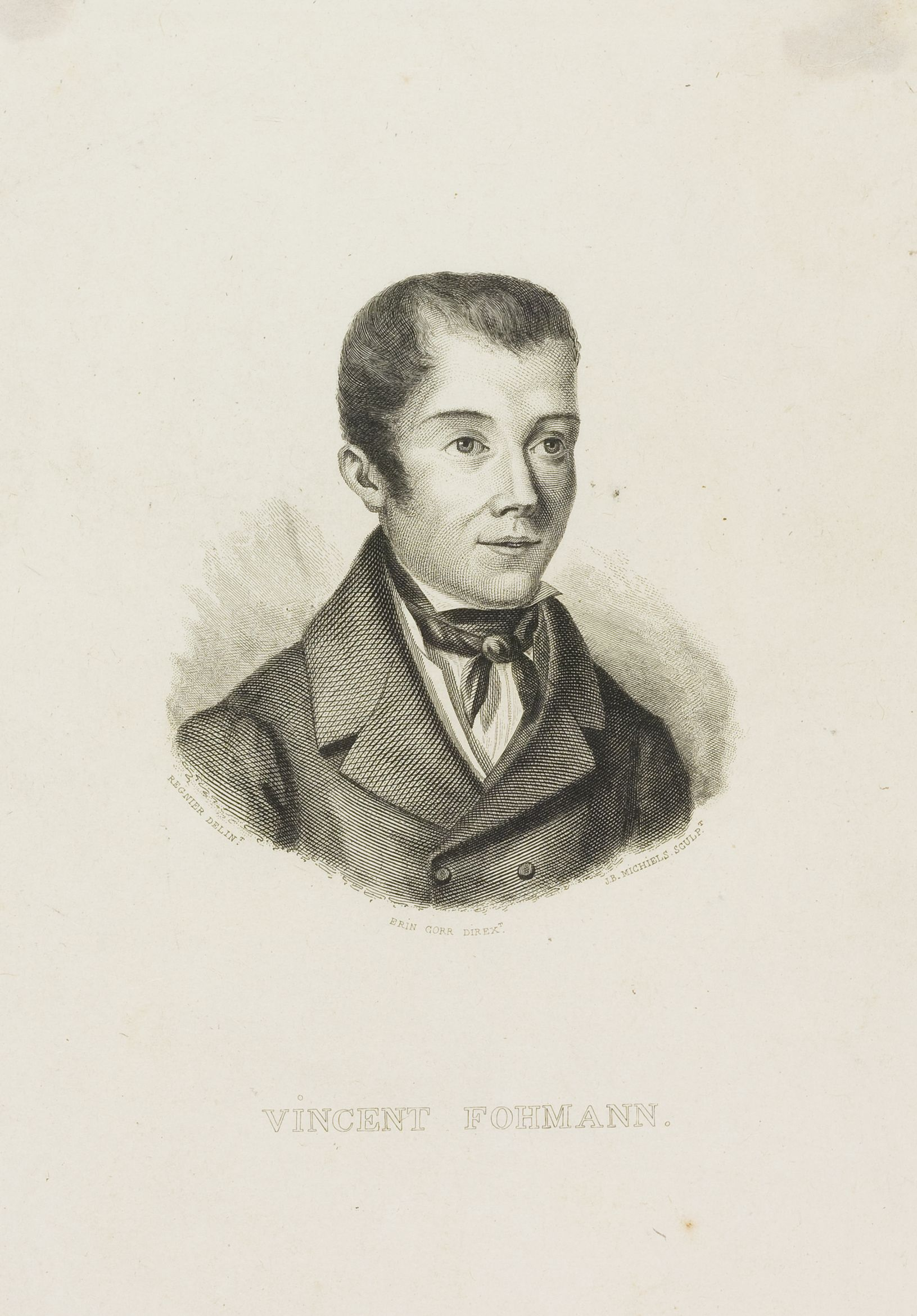
Vincenz Fohmann

Vincenz Fohmann (5 April 1794 – 25 September 1837) was a German anatomist, born in Assamstadt, today located in Baden-Württemberg.

He studied medicine at the University of Heidelberg, where under the guidance of Friedrich Tiedemann (1781–1861), he learned anatomy and physiology. For several years at Heidelberg, he served as an anatomical prosector. Working with cadavers, he mastered a process that involved injecting the lymphatic system with mercury. In 1827, he replaced Jean-Nicolas Comhaire (1778–1837) as professor of anatomy at the University of Liège.

Today, his anatomical collections involving the lymphatic system are preserved in museums of Heidelberg and Liège.

== Principal works ==
- Anatomische Untersuchungen über die Verbindungen der Saugadern mit den Venen, 1821 – Anatomical studies involving connection of the lymphatics with the veins.
- Das Saugadersystem der Wirbelthiere, 1827 – The lymphatic system of vertebrates.
