= Cochlear aqueduct =

Structure within the skull

Aqueduct of cochlea
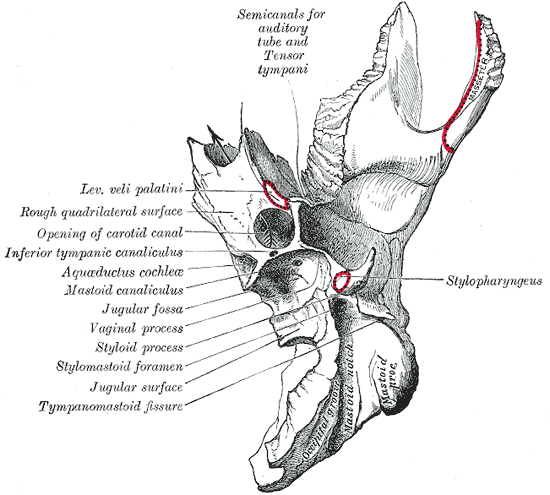
- Left temporal bone. Inferior surface. (Aquæductus cochleæ labeled at left, fifth from the top.)

Details

Identifiers
- Latin: aquaeductus cochleae
- MeSH: D003052
- TA98: A02.1.06.042
- TA2: 679
- FMA: 56454

Medial to the opening for the carotid canal and close to its posterior border, in front of the jugular fossa, is a triangular depression; at the apex of this is a small opening, the aquaeductus cochleae (or cochlear aqueduct, or aqueduct of cochlea), which lodges a tubular prolongation of the dura mater establishing a communication between the perilymphatic space and the subarachnoid space, and transmits a vein from the cochlea to join the internal jugular vein. The cochlear aqueduct lies perpendicular to the petrous apex, in contrast with the vestibular aqueduct, which lies parallel to the petrous apex.

== Additional images ==
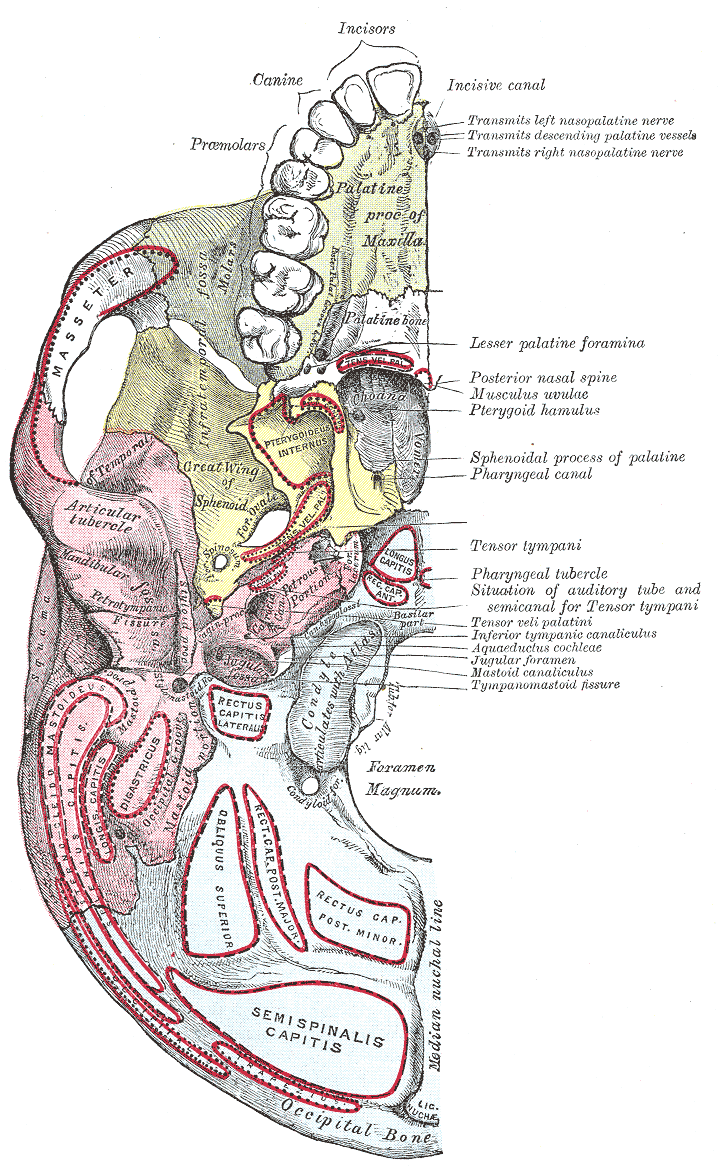
Base of skull. Inferior surface.
