= Superior ganglion of vagus nerve =

Sensory ganglion within Jugular foramen

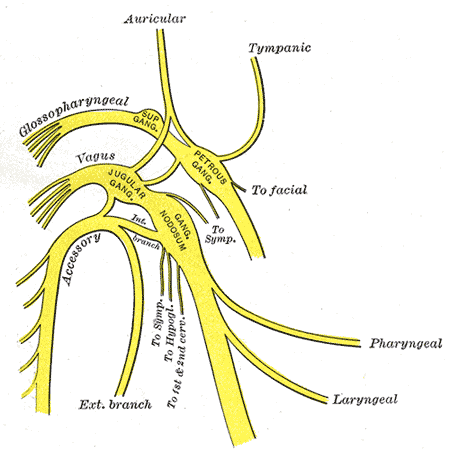
- Plan of upper portions of glossopharyngeal, vagus, and accessory nerves. The superior ganglion of the vagus nerve is labeled as ‘jugular gang.’

Details
- From: Vagus nerve
- To: Auricular branch of vagus nerve or meningeal branch of vagus nerve
- Innervates: Dura mater of posterior cranial fossa, parts of the auricle, external auditory canal and external surface of tympanic membrane

Identifiers
- Latin: ganglion superius nervi vagi, ganglion jugulare
- TA98: A14.2.01.154
- TA2: 6333
- FMA: 6229

The superior ganglion of the vagus nerve (also known as the jugular ganglion, or (in veterinary anatomy) as the proximal ganglion of the vagus nerve) is a sensory ganglion of the peripheral nervous system. It is located within the jugular foramen, where the vagus nerve exits the skull. It is smaller than and proximal to the inferior ganglion of the vagus nerve.

== Structure ==
The neurons in the superior ganglion of the vagus nerve are pseudounipolar and provide sensory innervation (general somatic afferent) through either the auricular or meningeal branch. The axons of these neurons synapse in the spinal trigeminal nucleus or nucleus of the solitary tract of the brainstem. Peripherally, the neurons found in the superior ganglion form two branches, the auricular and meningeal branch.

== Function ==
=== Auricular branch of the vagus nerve ===
The superior ganglion contains neurons which innervate the concha of the auricle, the posteroinferior surface of the external auditory canal and posteroinferior surface of the tympanic membrane all via the auricular branch of the vagus nerve.

=== Meningeal branch of the vagus nerve ===
The superior ganglion contains neurons which innervate some of the dura mater lining the posterior cranial fossa via the meningeal branch of the vagus nerve.

== Development ==
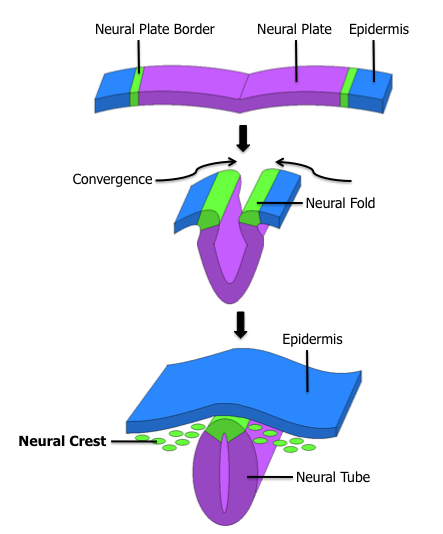
Embryonic development of the nervous system. The neural crest can be seen in light green.

The neurons in the superior ganglion of the vagus nerve are embryonically derived from the neural crest.

== Clinical significance ==
=== Vagal neuralgia ===
Pain in the external auditory canal (otalgia) can in rare cases be due to vagal neuralgia because of vascular compression of the vagus nerve (often by the posterior inferior cerebellar artery). The affected neurons are found in the superior ganglion and innervate the ear via the auricular branch of the vagus. The condition is treated by microvascular decompression of the vagus nerve where it exits the brainstem.
