= Mastoid canaliculus =

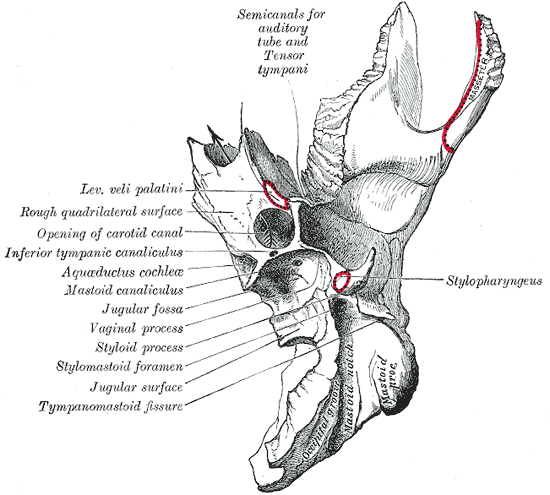
- Left temporal bone. Inferior surface. (Label for mastoid canaliculus is on left, sixth from the top.)

Details

Identifiers
- Latin: canaliculus mastoideus
- TA98: A02.1.06.044
- TA2: 681
- FMA: 56459

In the lateral part of the jugular fossa of the temporal bone is the mastoid canaliculus for the entrance of the auricular branch of the vagus nerve.

== Additional images ==
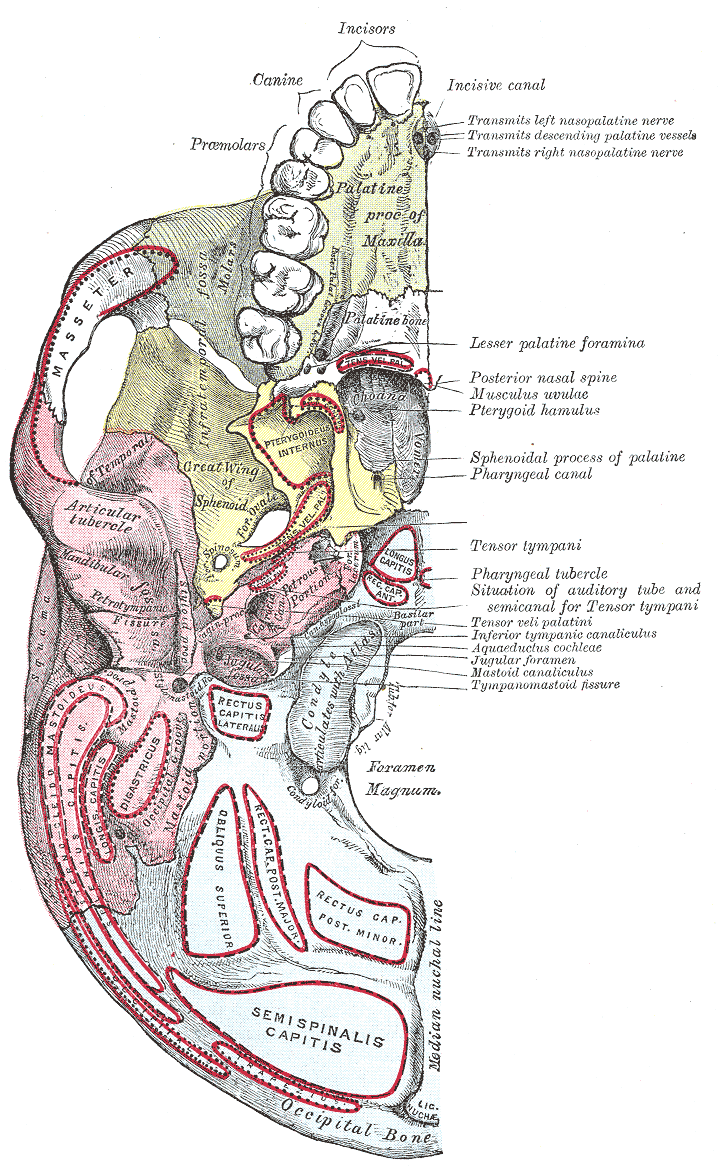
Base of skull. Inferior surface.
