= Auricular branch of vagus nerve =

Nerve of the head and neck

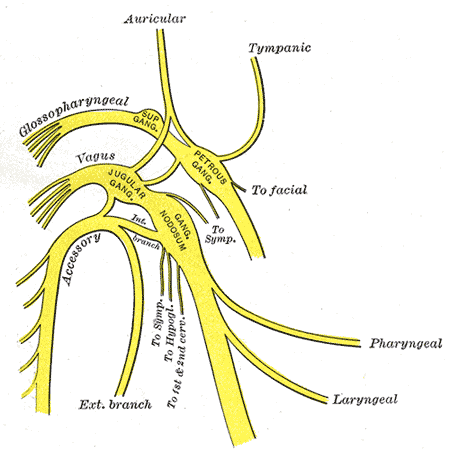
- Plan of upper portions of glossopharyngeal, vagus, and accessory nerves (auricular labeled at top center)

Details
- From: Vagus nerve

Identifiers
- Latin: ramus auricularis nervi vagi
- TA98: A14.2.01.156
- TA2: 6335
- FMA: 6232

The auricular branch of the vagus nerve is often termed the Alderman's nerve ("a reference to the old Aldermen of the City of London and their practice of using rosewater bowls at ceremonial banquets, where attendees were encouraged to place a napkin moistened with rosewater behind their ears in the belief that this would aid digestion") or Arnold's nerve (an eponym for Friedrich Arnold). The auricular branch of the vagus nerve supplies sensory innervation to the skin of the ear canal, tragus, tympanic membrane and auricle.

== Path ==
It arises from the superior ganglion of the vagus nerve, and is joined soon after its origin by a filament from the petrous ganglion of the glossopharyngeal; it passes behind the internal jugular vein, and enters the mastoid canaliculus on the lateral wall of the jugular fossa.

Traversing the substance of the temporal bone, it crosses the facial canal about 4 mm (0.16 in) above the stylomastoid foramen, and here it gives off an ascending branch which joins the facial nerve.

The nerve reaches the surface by passing through the tympanomastoid fissure between the mastoid process and the tympanic part of the temporal bone, and divides into two branches:

- one joins the posterior auricular nerve.
- the other is distributed to the skin of the back of the ear (auricle) and to the posterior part of the ear canal.

== Clinical significance ==
This nerve may be involved by the glomus jugulare tumour.

Laryngeal cancer can present with pain behind the ear and in the ear - this is a referred pain through the vagus nerve to the nerve of Arnold.

In a small portion of individuals, the auricular nerve is the afferent limb of the Ear-Cough or Arnold Reflex. Physical stimulation of the external acoustic meatus innervated by the auricular nerve elicits a cough, much like the other cough reflexes associated with the vagus nerve. Rarely, on introduction of speculum in the external ear, patients have experienced syncope due to the stimulation of the auricular branch of the vagus nerve.

== Clinical application ==
This nerve may be stimulated as a diagnostic or therapeutic technique

Transcutaneous vagus nerve stimulation (tVNS) was proposed by Ventureya (2000) for seizures. In 2003 Fallgatter et al. published "Far field potentials from the brain stem after transcutaneous vagus nerve stimulation" and in 2007 Kraus et al. did the first tVNS-fMRI study. In Europe, a device was approved for seizure treatment (NEMOS by CerboMed). Although the transcutaneous method has not been specifically approved in the United States (i.e. off-label) it is legal and being investigated (and found to be effective and safe) for many conditions including:

- Atrial fibrillation
- Depression
- Diabetes
- Endotoxemia
- Exercise capacity
- Memory
- Myocardial infarction
- Stroke
