= Hiatus for greater petrosal nerve =

Hole in the temporal bone

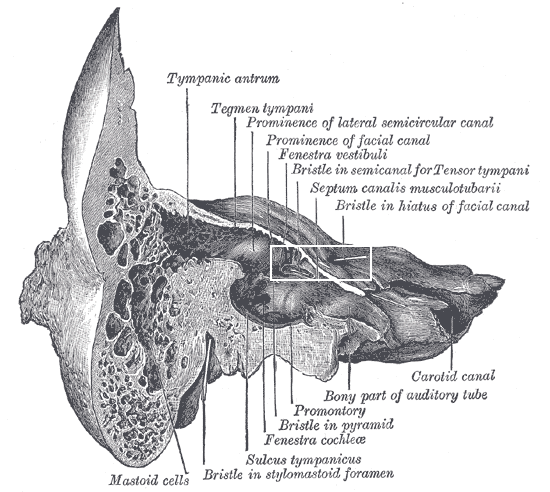
- Coronal section of right temporal bone. (Bristle in hiatus of facial canal labeled at upper right.)

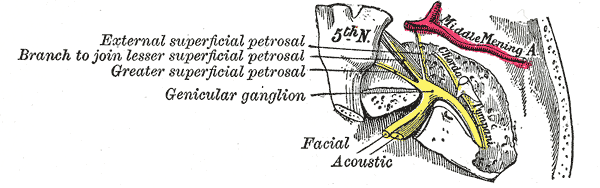
- The course and connections of the facial nerve in the temporal bone.

Details

Identifiers
- Latin: hiatus canalis nervi petrosi majoris, hiatus canalis facialis
- TA98: A02.1.06.024
- TA2: 662
- FMA: 56445

The hiatus for the greater petrosal nerve is a small hole in the petrous part of the temporal bone which connects the facial canal to the middle cranial fossa. The greater petrosal nerve travels through it to branch from the facial nerve and reach the middle cranial fossa on its way to the pterygopalatine ganglion.
