= Jugular fossa =

Depression on the underside of the temporal bone of the skull

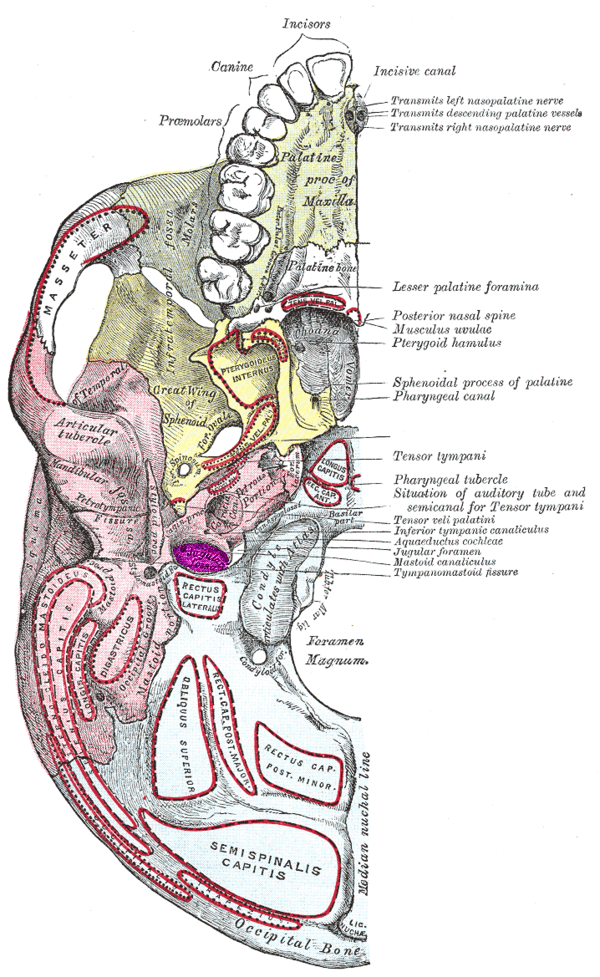
- Base of the skull. Inferior surface. Jugular fossa labeled in purple near center.

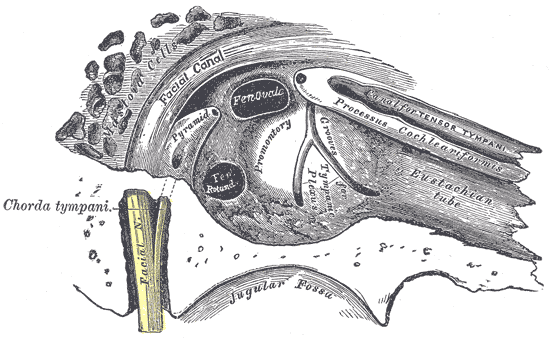
- View of the inner wall of the tympanum. (Jugular fossa visible at bottom.)

Details
- Part of: Temporal bone of skull

Identifiers
- Latin: fossa jugularis ossis temporalis
- TA98: A02.1.06.041
- TA2: 678
- FMA: 56429

The jugular fossa is a deep depression (fossa) in the inferior part of the temporal bone at the base of the skull. It lodges the bulb of the internal jugular vein.

== Structure ==
The jugular fossa is located in the temporal bone, posterior to the carotid canal and the cochlear aqueduct.

In the bony ridge dividing the carotid canal from the jugular fossa is the small inferior tympanic canaliculus for the passage of the tympanic branch of the glossopharyngeal nerve.

In the lateral part of the jugular fossa is the mastoid canaliculus for the entrance of the auricular branch of the vagus nerve.

Behind the jugular fossa is a quadrilateral area, the jugular surface, covered with cartilage in the fresh state, and articulating with the jugular process of the occipital bone.

=== Variation ===
The jugular fossa has variable depth and size in different skulls.

== Function ==
The jugular fossa lodges the bulb of the internal jugular vein.

== Clinical significance ==
Abnormally shaped jugular fossae may cause ear problems. If it lies close to the cochlea, it may cause tinnitus. A high jugular fossa may be linked to Ménière's disease.

== See also ==
- Fossa (anatomy)

== Additional images ==
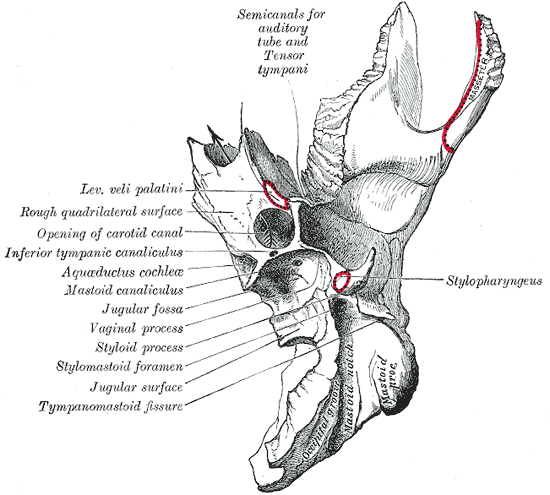
Left temporal bone. Inferior surface. (Label for jugular fossa at left, sixth from bottom.)

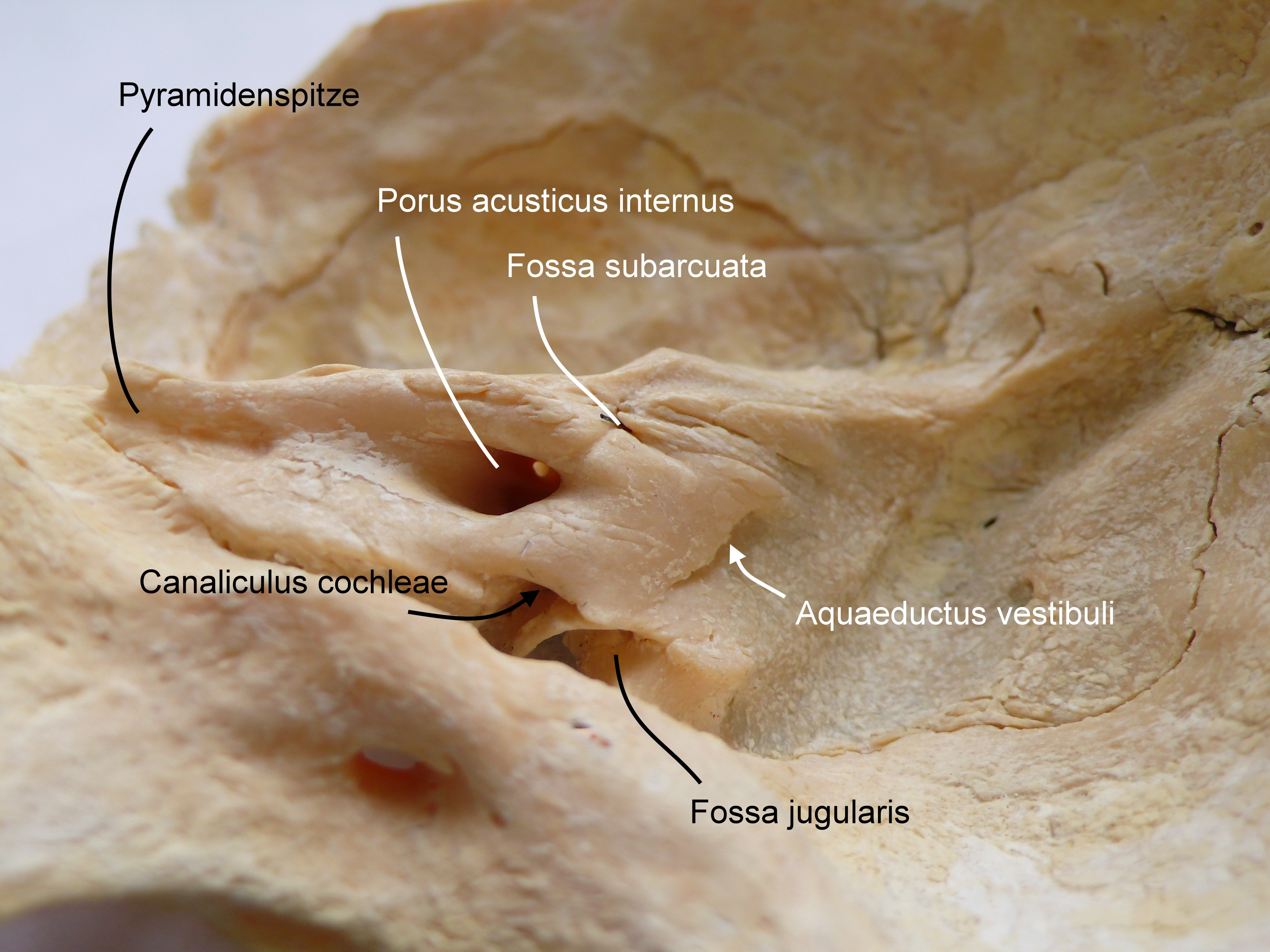
Temporal bone
