= Secondary palate development =

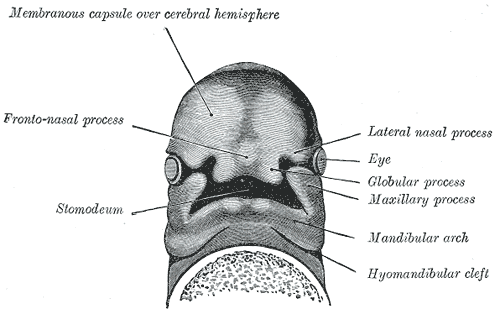
- Under surface of the head of a human embryo about twenty-nine days old (After His.). The palatal shelves are yet to form from the maxillary processes

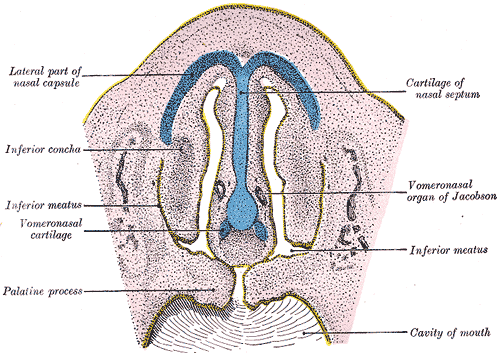
- Frontal section of nasal cavities of a human embryo 28 mm. long (Kollmann) at about forty-four days. The two palatine processes can be seen here post-elevation in a horizontal position. The medial edges of the palatine processes are yet to fuse and form the roof of the oral cavity.

Details
- Carnegie stage: 17
- Precursor: Maxillary prominence
- Gives rise to: Palate, Oral cavity proper

The development of the secondary palate commences in the sixth week of human embryonic development. It is characterised by the formation of two palatal shelves on the maxillary prominences, the elevation of these shelves to a horizontal position, and then a process of palatal fusion between the horizontal shelves. The shelves will also fuse anteriorly upon the primary palate, with the incisive foramen being the landmark between the primary palate and secondary palate. This forms what is known as the roof of the mouth, or the hard palate.

The formation and development of the secondary palate occurs through signalling molecules SHH, BMP-2, FGF-8, among others.

Failure of the secondary palate to develop correctly may result in a cleft palate disorder.

== Formation of palatal shelves ==
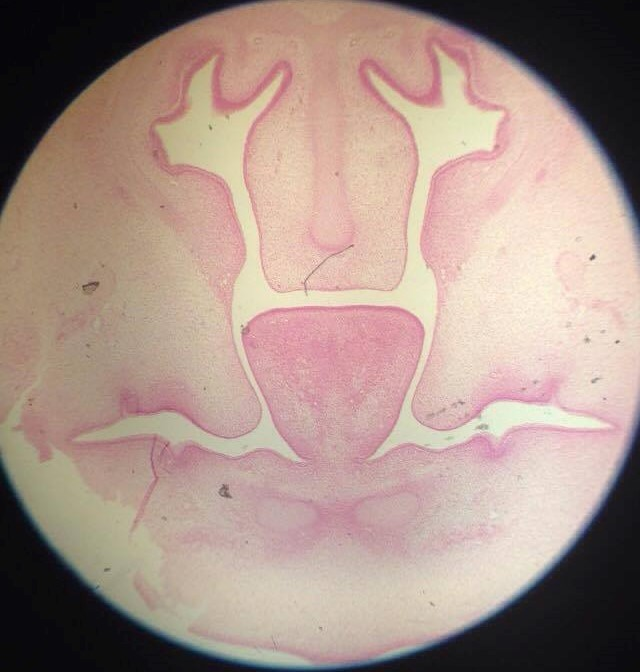
Palatal shelves developing in preparation for elevation

The formation of the vertical palatal shelves occurs during week 7 of embryological development, on the maxillary processes of the head of the embryo, lateral to the developing tongue.

== Palatal shelf elevation ==
The elevation of the palatal shelves from a vertical position to a horizontal one occurs during week 8 of embryological development. The direct cause of this movement is unknown, but a number of possibilities have been identified as follows:

- Muscular contraction;
- Hydrostatic forces exerted by glycosaminoglycans and hyaluronan;
- Mesenchymal reorganisation;
- Mesenchyme cell contraction;
- Epithelial reorganisation;
- Movement of the developing tongue.

== Suggested mechanisms for palatal fusion ==
Fusion between the two palatal shelves occurs during week 9 of embryonic development. In this time, the elevated palatal shelves join together to form one continuous structure, with the medial edge epithelium (the shelf surfaces which are closest to each other) disappearing.

The specific mechanism by which the medial edge epithelium disappears has been differed over by academics. The three most distinguished theories related to the explanation of palatal fusion are as follows:

- Epithelial apoptosis;
- Epithelial-to-mesenchymal transformation;
- Epithelial cell migration.

== See also ==
- Pharyngeal arch – Embryonic precursor structures in vertebrates
