= Palatine arteries =

Palatine arteries can refer to:

- Ascending palatine artery (arteria palatina ascendens)
- Descending palatine artery (arteria palatina descendens)
- Greater palatine artery (arteria palatina major)
- Lesser palatine arteries (arteriae palatinae minores)
