= Secondary palate =

Oral anatomical structure

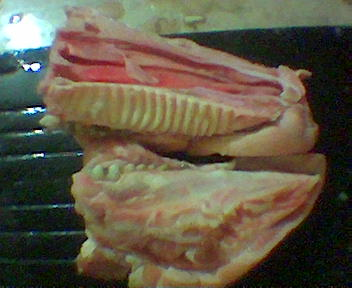
- A sagittal section of a pig's (Sus sp.) snout showing the secondary palate with pronounced palatine raphe.

Details

Identifiers
- Latin: Palatum secundarium, palatum definitivum
- TE: palate_by_E5.4.1.1.4.0.5 E5.4.1.1.4.0.5

The secondary palate is an anatomical structure that divides the nasal cavity from the oral cavity in many vertebrates.

In human embryology, it refers to that portion of the hard palate that is formed by the growth of the two palatine shelves medially and their mutual fusion in the midline. It forms the majority of the adult palate and meets the primary palate at the incisive foramen.

== Clinical significance ==
Secondary palate development begins in the sixth week of pregnancy and can lead to cleft palate when development goes awry.

There are three major mechanisms known to cause this failure:

1. Growth retardation — Palatal shelves do not grow enough to meet each other.
2. Mechanical obstruction — Improper mouth size, or abnormal anatomical structures in the embryonic mouth prevent fully grown shelves from meeting each other.
3. Midline epithelial dysfunction (MED) — The surface mucosa of embryonic shelves is impaired, which causes a failure of palatal fusion.

== Evolution ==
The secondary palate is thought to have a significant role in the development of some warm-blooded animals. The separation of the mouth from the nasal cavity also allowed chewing and breathing to occur at the same time. Early creatures with secondary palates include crocodilians (who are cold-blooded), and cynodonts and a few others among the therapsids, known from the fossil record in the mid-Permian. Mammals inherited their hard palates from the cynodonts.
