= Processus palatinus =

Processus palatinus may refer to:

- Palatine process of maxilla, also known by the Latin term processus palatinus ossis maxillae
- Primary palate, also known by the Latin term processus palatinus medianus
