= Tonsillar fossa =

Anatomical feature

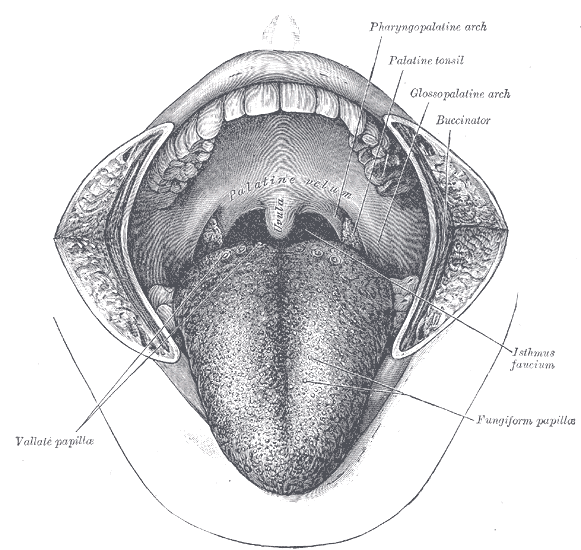
- The mouth cavity. (Tonsillar fossa, which is a part of the oropharynx, visible but not labeled.)

Details

Identifiers
- Latin: fossa tonsillaris
- TA98: A05.2.01.009
- TA2: 2851
- FMA: 55041

The tonsillar fossa (or tonsillar sinus) is a space delineated by the triangular fold (plica triangularis) of the palatoglossal and palatopharyngeal arches within the lateral wall of the oral cavity.

In many cases, however, this sinus is obliterated by its walls becoming adherent to the palatine tonsils.
