= Fauces (throat) =

Opening at the back of the mouth into the throat

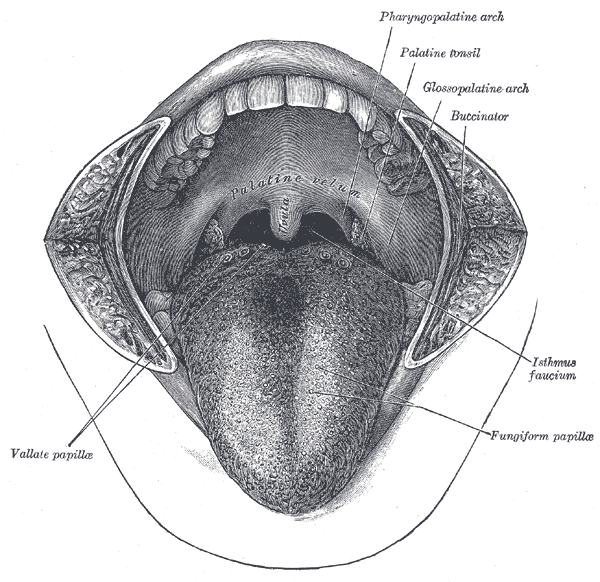
- A view of the fauces through the mouth cavity. The cheeks have been slit transversely and the tongue pulled forward. (Fauces labelled as Isthmus faucium at center right.)

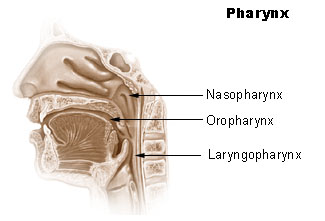
- Pharynx

Details
- System: lymphoid system
- Artery: faucial artery
- Vein: faucial vein
- Nerve: brachial plexus
- Lymph: cervical nodes

Identifiers
- Latin: fauces
- TA98: A05.2.01.002
- TA2: 2846
- FMA: 55006

The fauces (also termed the isthmus of fauces or oropharyngeal isthmus) is the opening at the back of the mouth into the throat. It is a narrow passage between the velum and the base of the tongue.

The fauces is a part of the oropharynx directly behind the oral cavity as a subdivision, bounded superiorly by the soft palate, laterally by the palatoglossal and palatopharyngeal arches, and inferiorly by the tongue. The arches form the pillars of the fauces (faucial pillars, tonsillar pillars, palatine arches). The anterior (front) pillar is the palatoglossal arch formed of the palatoglossus muscle. The posterior (back) pillar is the palatopharyngeal arch formed of the palatopharyngeus muscle. Between these two arches on the lateral walls of the oropharynx is the tonsillar fossa which is the location of the palatine tonsil.

Each arch runs downwards, laterally and forwards, from the soft palate to the side of the tongue. The approximation of the arches due to the contraction of the palatoglossal muscles constricts the fauces, and is essential to swallowing.

== Faucitis ==
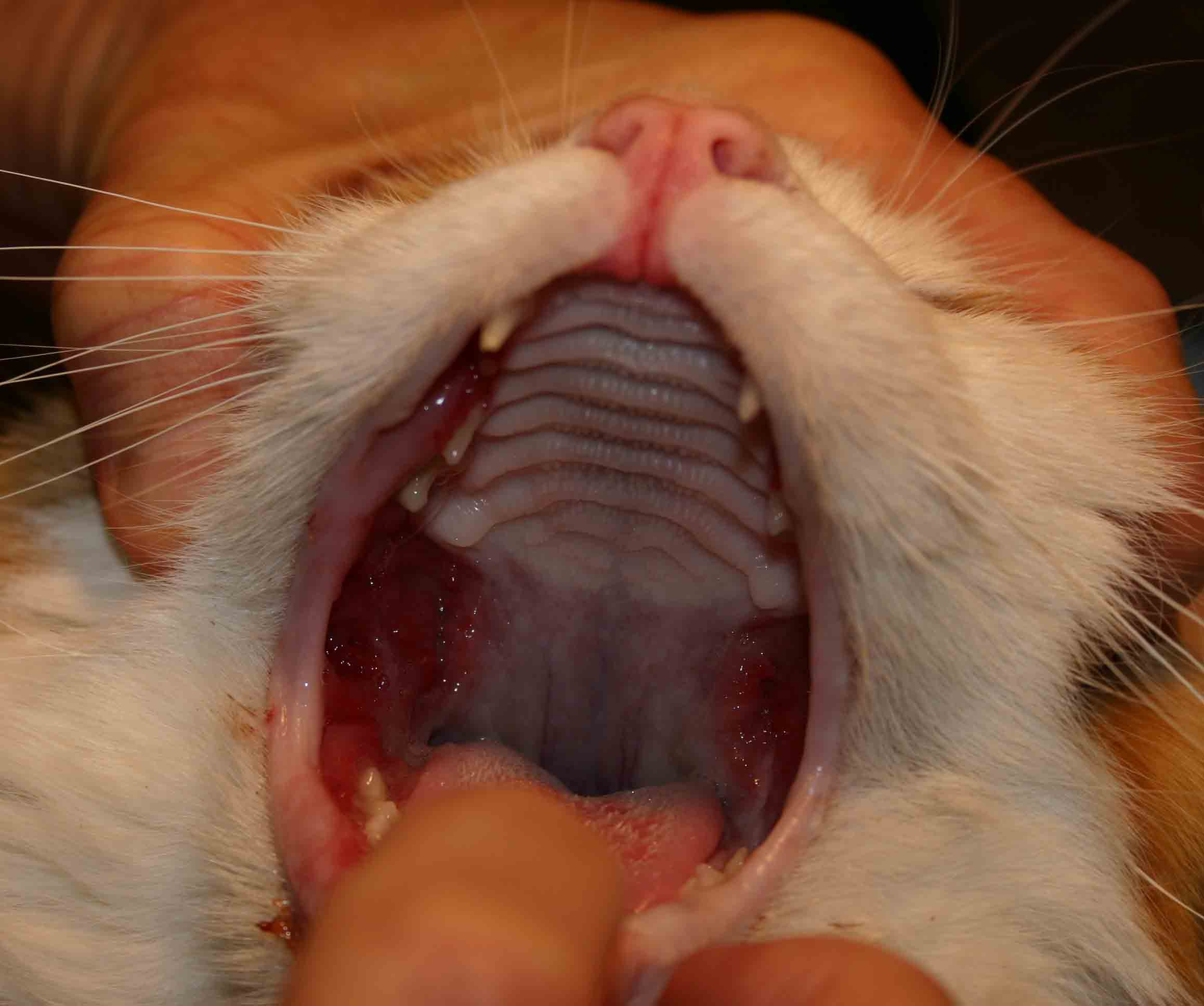
Faucitis in a 12-year-old cat that presented with inappetence, tenderness of the mouth, and inability to groom itself. Gingivitis, erosive lingual ulcers and faucitis were evident clinically

Inflammation of the fauces, known as faucitis, is seen in animals. In cats, faucitis is usually a secondary disease to gingivitis but can be a primary disease. In this species faucitis is usually caused by bacterial and viral infections although food allergies need to be excluded in any diagnosis. Treatment is symptomatic and includes broad-spectrum antibiotics and in severe cases where cats are inappetent, corticosteroids (often given as depot forms, e.g. depomedrol) or chemotherapy (e.g. chlorambucil).

== See also ==
- List of anatomical isthmi
