= Brevisomabathynella cooperi =

Scientific classification
- Domain: Eukaryota
- Kingdom: Animalia
- Phylum: Arthropoda
- Class: Malacostraca
- Order: Bathynellacea
- Family: Parabathynellidae
- Genus: Brevisomabathynella
- Species: B. cooperi

Binomial name
- Brevisomabathynella cooperi Cho, Park & Ranga Reddy, 2006

Species of crustacean

Brevisomabathynella cooperi is a species of crustacean. It was first found in Western Australia. It stands out within its family by its pygmoid body and its long head. At the same time, its mouthparts show: a very large labrum with a great number (over 30) of teeth; its incisor process with four main teeth and three very small other teeth, arranged in two groups; and the distal-inner spines of the farthermost endite of its maxillule being longer than its terminal spines. These distinct characters appear to have developed due to its predatory habits, which in turn are evidenced by the presence of an ostracod prey in the gut of B. cunyuensis, its sister species. This genus closely resembles the genus Notobathynella.
