= Lingual tonsils =

Lymphatic tissue in the tongue

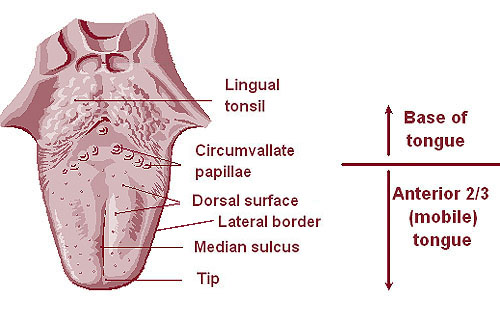
- Tongue

Details
- System: Immune system (lymphatic system)

Identifiers
- Latin: tonsilla lingualis
- TA98: A05.1.04.022
- TA2: 2830
- FMA: 54836

The lingual tonsils are a collection of lymphoid tissue located in the lamina propria of the root of the tongue. This lymphoid tissue consists of the nodules rich in cells of the immune system (immunocytes). The immunocytes initiate the immune response when the lingual tonsils get in contact with invading microorganisms (pathogenic bacteria, viruses or parasites).

== Structure ==
=== Microanatomy ===
Lingual tonsils are covered externally by stratified squamous epithelium (nonkeratinized) that invaginates inward forming tonsillar crypts. Beneath the epithelium is a layer of lymphoid nodules containing lymphocytes. Mucous glands located at the root of the tongue are drained through several ducts into the crypts of the lingual tonsils. Secretions of these mucous glands keep the crypts clean and free of any debris.

=== Blood supply ===
Lingual tonsils are located on posterior aspect of tongue which is supplied through:

- Lingual artery, branch of external carotid artery
- Tonsillar artery
- Ascending and descending palatine arteries
- Ascending pharyngeal branch of external carotid artery

=== Nerve supply ===
Lingual tonsils are innervated by tonsillar nerves from the tonsilar plexus, formed by the glossopharyngeal and vagus nerves.

== Function ==
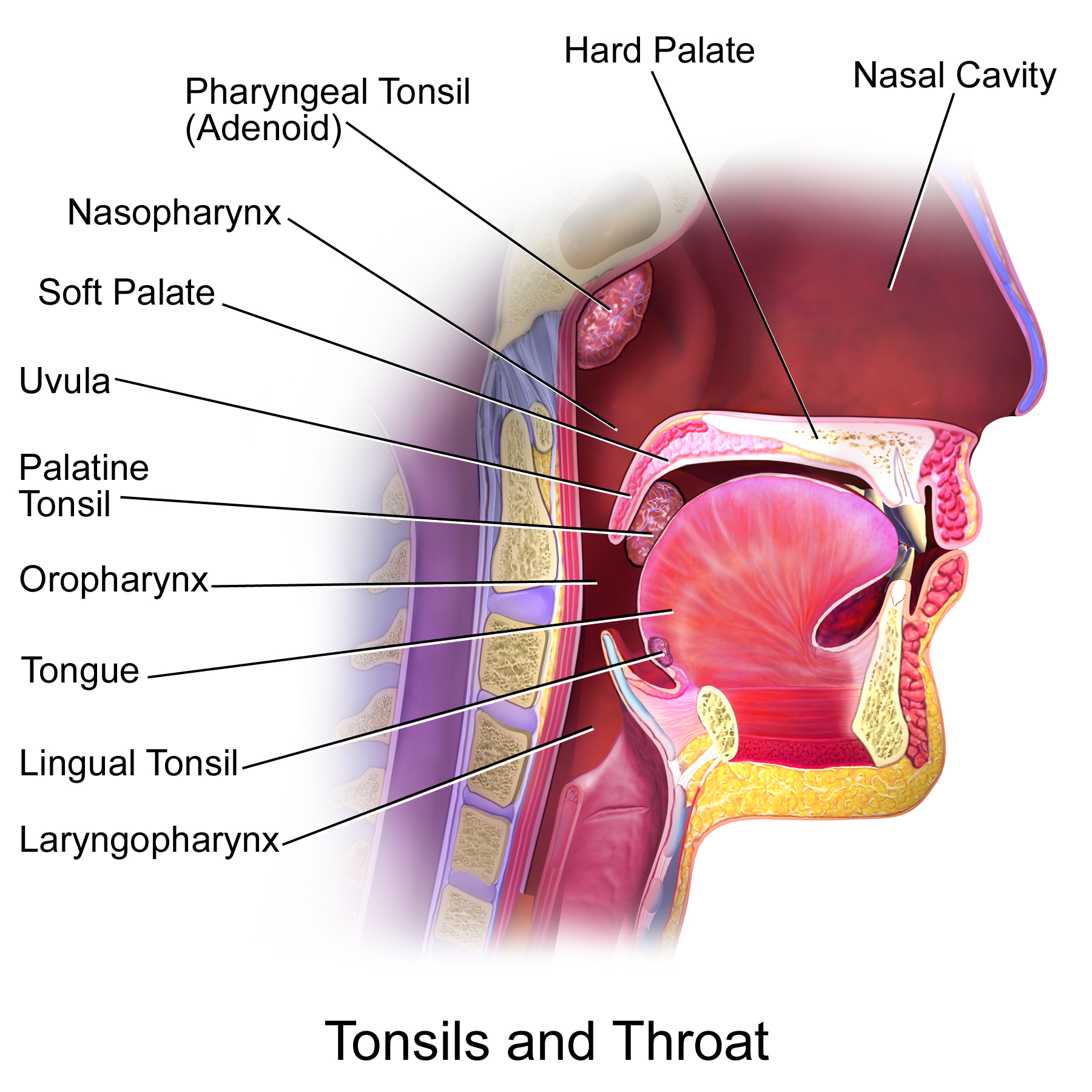
Tonsils and the throat–lingual tonsils labelled

Like other lymphatic tissues, the function of lingual tonsils is to prevent infections. These tonsils contain B and T lymphocytes which get activated when harmful bacteria and viruses come in contact with tonsils. B lymphocytes kill pathogens by producing antibodies against them, while T lymphocytes directly kill them releasing cytotoxic substances or indirectly by stimulating other cells of the immune system.

== Clinical significance ==
=== Cancer ===
Squamous cell carcinoma is a type of neoplasm that can affect lingual tonsils.

=== Sleep apnea ===
Enlarged or hypertrophic lingual tonsils have the potential to cause or exacerbate sleep apnea.

== Additional images ==
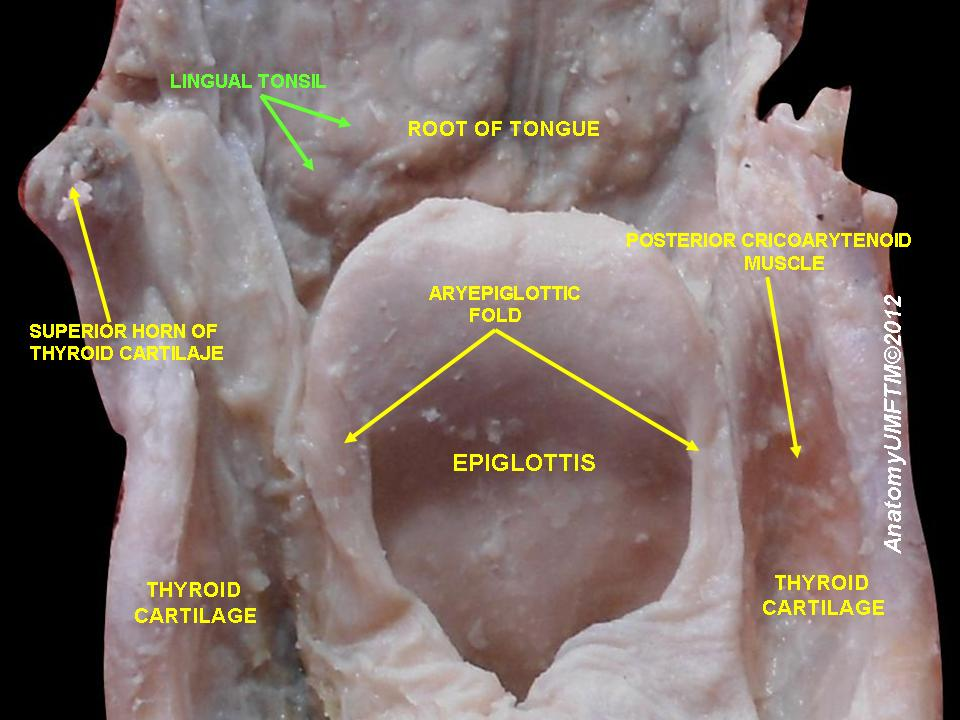
Lingual tonsil

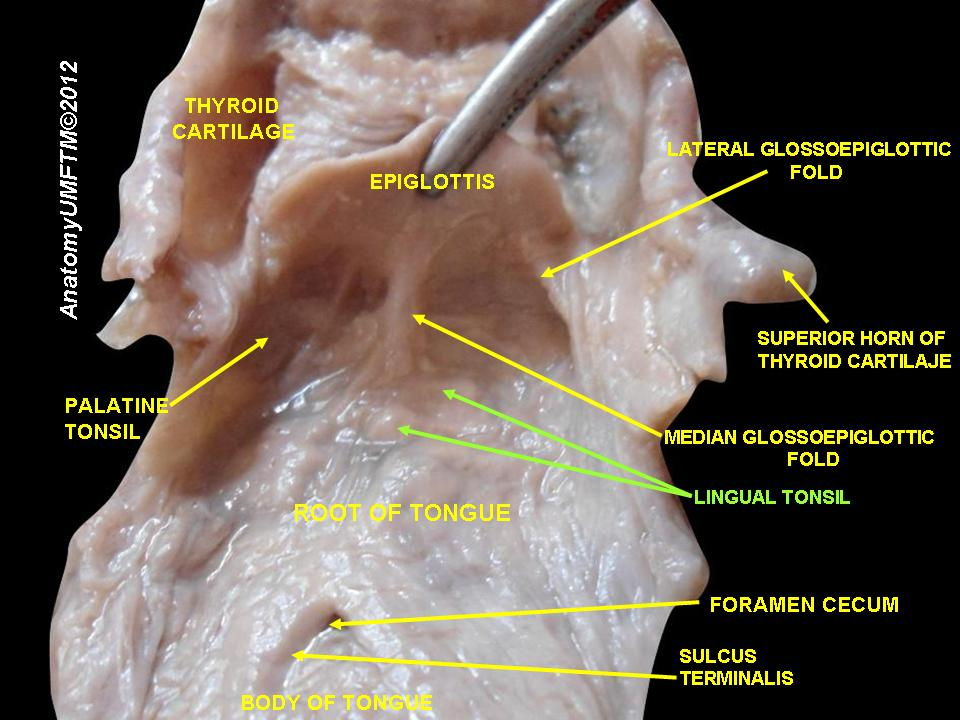
Lingual tonsil

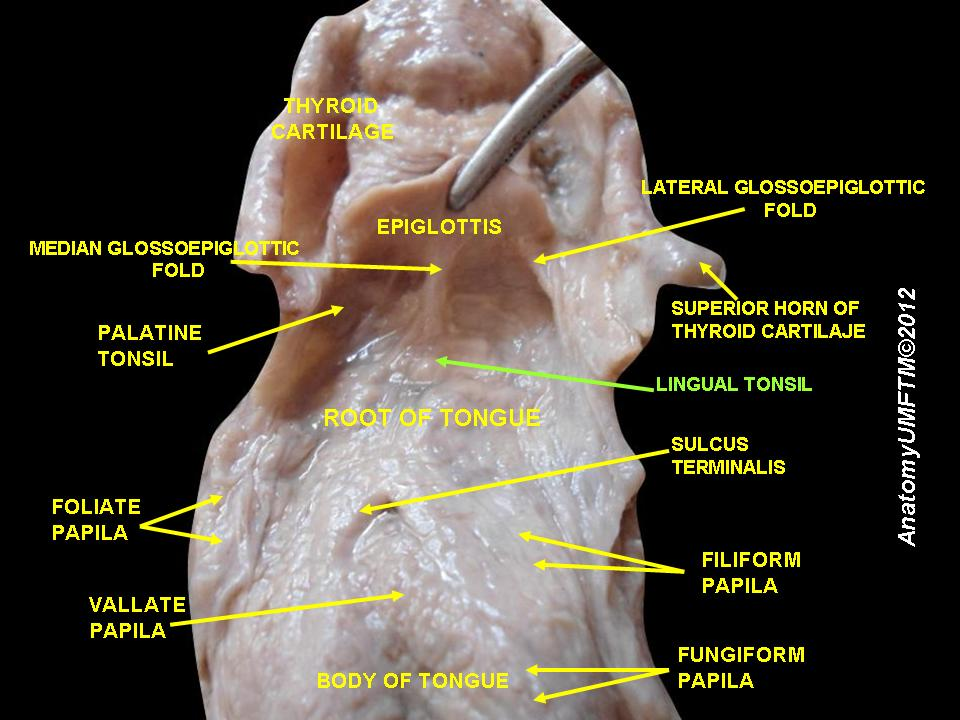
Lingual tonsils
