= Palatopharyngeal =

Palatopharyngeal may refer to:

- Palatopharyngeal arch
- Palatopharyngeus muscle, also known as palatopharyngeal muscle
