= Posterior septal branches of sphenopalatine artery =

Details
- Source: Sphenopalatine artery

Identifiers
- Latin: rami septales posteriores arteriae sphenopalatinae
- TA98: A12.2.05.090
- TA2: 4462
- FMA: 71690

Crossing the under surface of the sphenoid, the sphenopalatine artery ends on the nasal septum as the posterior septal branches; these anastomose with the ethmoidal arteries and the septal branch of the superior labial; one branch descends in a groove on the vomer to the incisive canal and anastomoses with the descending palatine artery.
