= Ascending artery =

Ascending artery may refer to:

- Ascending palatine artery, an artery in the head that branches off the facial artery.
- Ascending pharyngeal artery, an artery in the neck that supplies the pharynx.
- Ascending cervical artery, a small artery which arises from the inferior thyroid artery
