= Lesser palatine arteries =

Artery of the head

Details
- Source: Descending palatine artery
- Branches: Tonsillary
- Supplies: Palatine tonsils, soft palate

Identifiers
- Latin: arteriae palatinae minores
- TA98: A12.2.05.086
- TA2: 4458
- FMA: 71688

The lesser palatine arteries are arteries of the head. It is a branch of the descending palatine artery. They supply the palatine tonsils and the soft palate.

== Structure ==
The lesser palatine arteries are branches of the descending palatine artery. They go through the lesser palatine foramina. They anastomose with the ascending pharyngeal artery.

== Function ==
The lesser palatine arteries give off tonsillary branches to supply the palatine tonsils. They also gives off mucosal branches that usually supply the soft palate, and potentially the hard palate.

== See also ==
- Lesser palatine nerve
