= Intermaxillary segment =

Embryonic structure

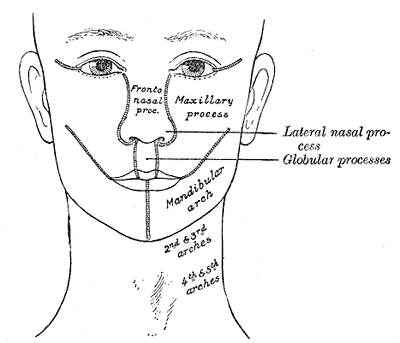
- Diagram showing the regions of the adult face and neck related to the fronto-nasal process and the branchial arches. (Globular processes labeled at center right.)

Details
- Precursor: medial nasal prominence
- Gives rise to: primary palate

The intermaxillary segment in an embryo is a mass of tissue formed by the merging of tissues in the vicinity of the nose. It is essential for human survival. It is primordial, since in the further development of the embryo this particular mass no longer appears, but parts of it remain in "the intermaxillary portion of the upper jaw, the portion of the upper lip, and the primary palate".

More precisely, the rounded lateral angles of the medial process constitute the globular processes. It is also known as the "Intermaxillary segment". It gives rise to the premaxilla.

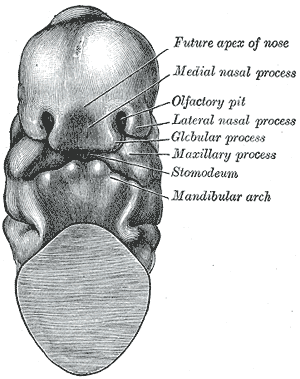
Head end of human embryo of about thirty to thirty-one days.

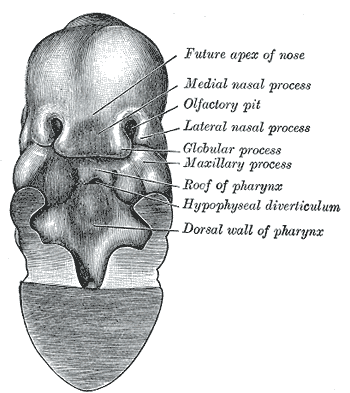
Same embryo as shown in Fig. 45, with front wall of pharynx removed.

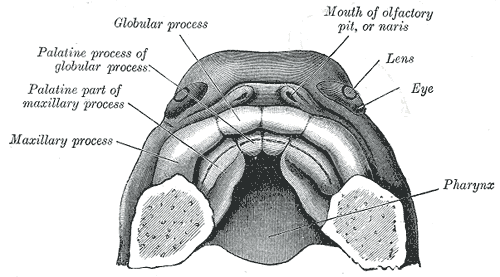
The roof of the mouth of a human embryo, aged about two and a half months, showing the mode of formation of the palate.

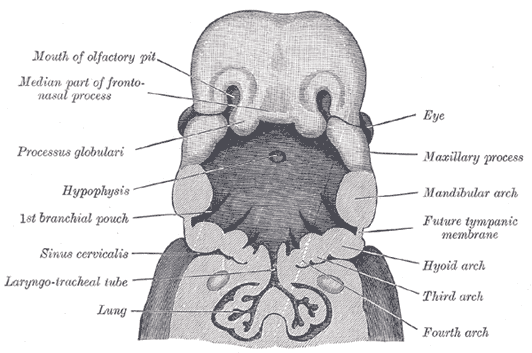
The head and neck of a human embryo thirty-two days old, seen from the ventral surface.

== See also ==
- Philtrum
