= Foramina of Scarpa =

Canals in the middle line of the palatine process

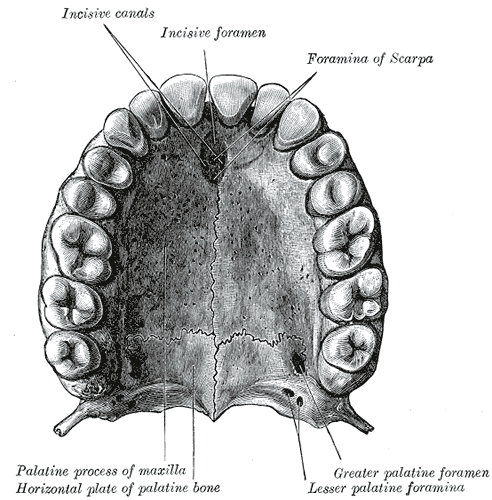
- The bony palate and alveolar arch.

In the maxilla, occasionally two additional canals are present in the middle line of the palatine process; they are termed the foramina of Scarpa, and when present transmit the nasopalatine nerves, the left passing through the anterior, and the right through the posterior canal.

== See also ==
- Antonio Scarpa – anatomist
