= Descending palatine artery =

Artery of the posterior face

- Plan of branches of internal maxillary artery. ("Desc. pal." visible in upper right.)

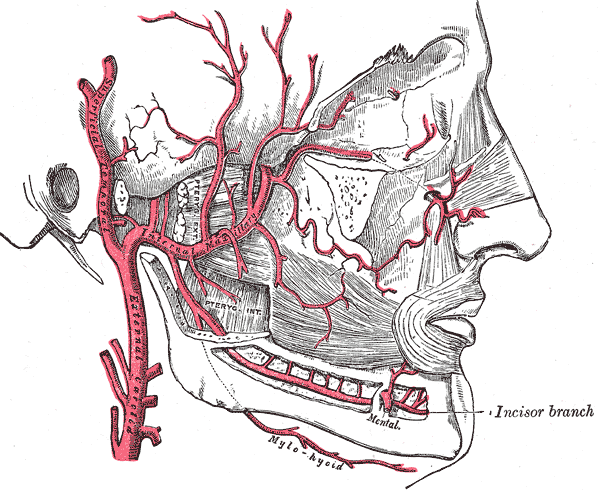
- Plan of branches of internal maxillary artery. (Artery not labeled, but region is visible.)

Details
- Source: Maxillary artery (3rd part)
- Branches: Greater palatine artery, lesser palatine arteries
- Supplies: Hard palate, soft palate

Identifiers
- Latin: arteria palatina descendens
- TA98: A12.2.05.084
- TA2: 4456
- FMA: 49791

The descending palatine artery is a branch of the third part of the maxillary artery supplying the hard and soft palate.

== Course ==
It descends through the greater palatine canal with the greater and lesser palatine branches of the pterygopalatine ganglion, and, emerging from the greater palatine foramen, runs forward in a groove on the medial side of the alveolar border of the hard palate to the incisive canal; the terminal branch of the artery passes upward through this canal to anastomose with the sphenopalatine artery.

== Branches ==
Branches are distributed to the gums, the palatine glands, and the mucous membrane of the roof of the mouth; while in the pterygopalatine canal it gives off twigs which descend in the lesser palatine canals to supply the soft palate and palatine tonsil, anastomosing with the ascending palatine artery.

According to Terminologia Anatomica, the descending palatine artery branches into the greater palatine artery and lesser palatine arteries.

== See also ==
- Ascending palatine artery

== Additional images ==
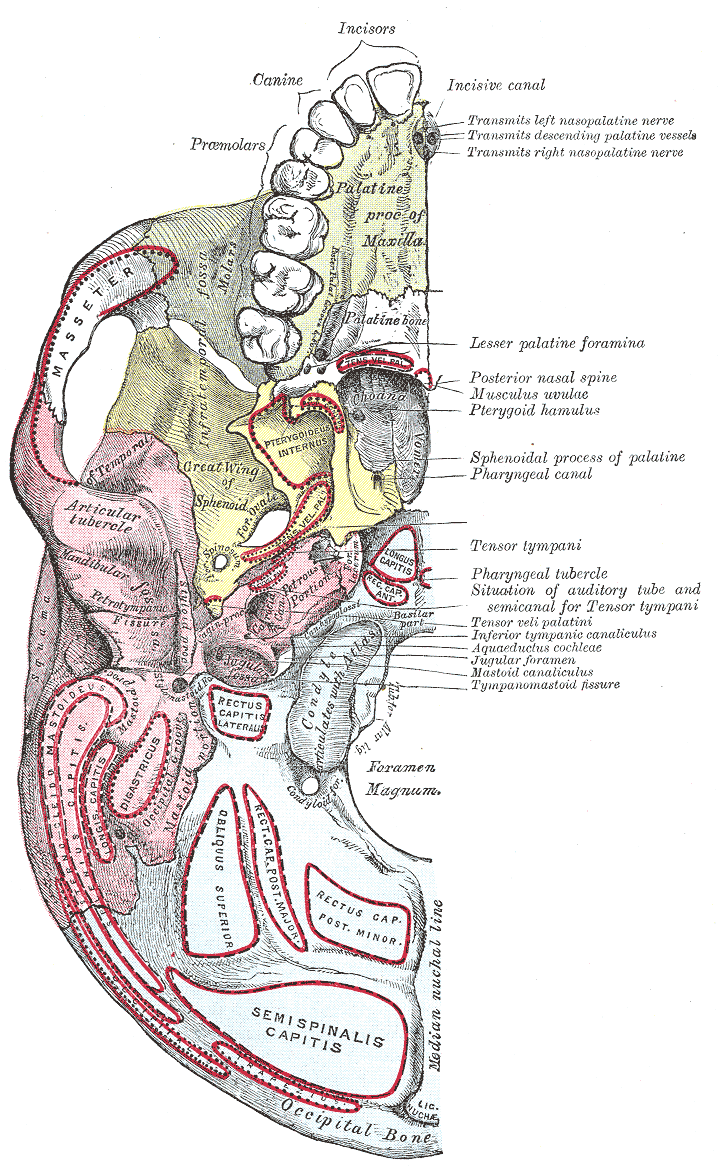
Base of skull. Inferior surface.
