= Primary palate =

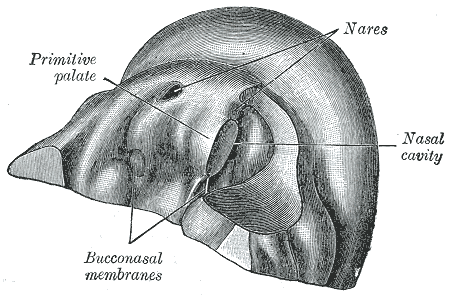
- Primitive palate of a human embryo of thirty-seven to thirty-eight days.

Details
- Precursor: intermaxillary segment

Identifiers
- Latin: palatum primarium; processus palatinus medianus
- TE: palate_by_E5.4.1.1.4.0.3 E5.4.1.1.4.0.3

The primary palate is an embryonic structure in the developing skull that, together with the more posterior secondary palate, separates the nasal from the oral cavity. It is a derivative of the first pharyngeal arch. Around the fifth week, the intermaxillary segment arises as a result of fusion of the two medial nasal processes and the frontonasal process within the embryo. The intermaxillary segment gives rise to the primary palate. The primary palate will form the premaxillary portion of the maxilla (anterior one-third of the final palate). This small portion is anterior to the incisive foramen and will contain the maxillary incisors.

== See also ==
- Hard palate – Comprised in part by the primary palate
