= Ascending palatine artery =

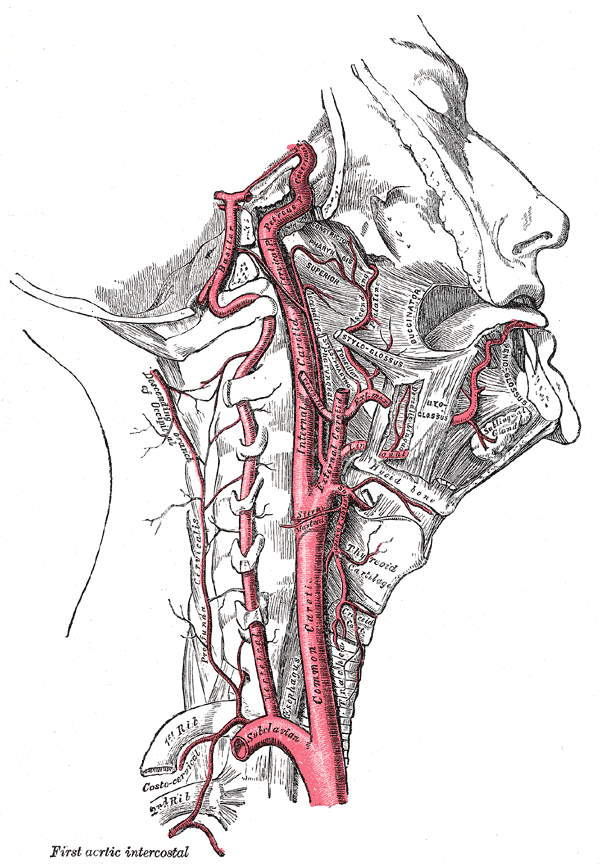
- The internal carotid and vertebral arteries. Right side. (Ascending palantine visible at center, to left of mouth.)

Details
- Source: Facial artery
- Supplies: Levator veli palatini soft palate palatine tonsils auditory tube

Identifiers
- Latin: arteria palatina ascendens
- TA98: A12.2.05.021
- TA2: 4389
- FMA: 49555

The ascending palatine artery is an artery is a branch of the facial artery which ascends along the neck before splitting into two terminal branches; one branch supplies the soft palate, and the other supplies the palatine tonsil and pharyngotympanic tube.

== Structure ==
=== Origin ===
The ascending palatine artery arises from the proximal facial artery (close to the facial artery's origin).

=== Course ===
It passes superior-ward between the styloglossus muscle and stylopharyngeus muscle to reach the side of the pharynx.

It ascends along the side of the pharynx between the superior pharyngeal constrictor and the medial pterygoid muscle to near the base of the skull.

Near the levator veli palatini muscle, the artery splits into its two terminal branches.

=== Branches ===
One terminal branch passes along the levator veli palatini muscle, winding around the superior border of the superior pharyngeal constrictor to provide arterial supply to the soft palate and anastomose with the greater palatine artery and its contralateral partner.

The other terminal branch pierces the superior pharyngeal constrictor to provide arterial supply to the palatine tonsil and pharyngotympanic tube. It forms anastomoses with the tonsillar artery and ascending pharyngeal artery.

== See also ==
- Descending palatine artery
