= Nasopalatine nerve =

Nerve of the head

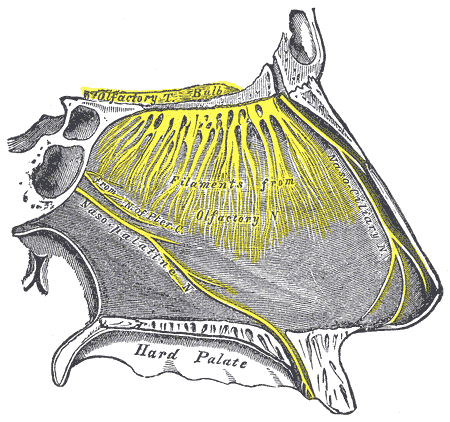
- Nerves of septum of nose, right side. (Nasopalatine is lower yellow line.)

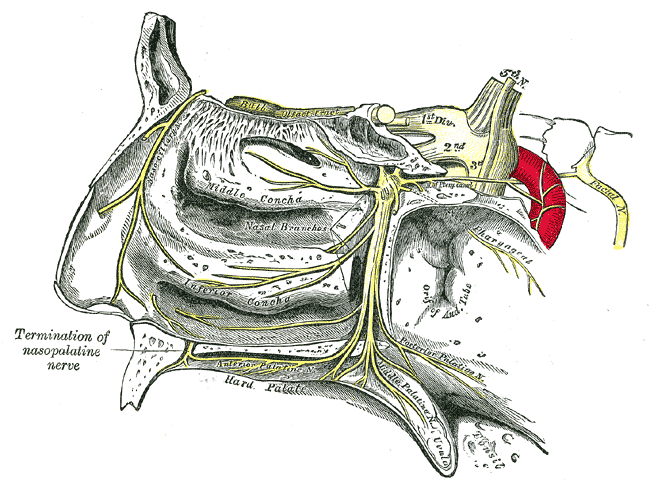
- The sphenopalatine ganglion and its branches. (Termination of nasopalatine nerve labeled at bottom left.)

Details
- From: Maxillary nerve, pterygopalatine ganglion
- Innervates: Palate, nasal septum

Identifiers
- Latin: nervus nasopalatinus
- TA98: A14.2.01.043
- TA2: 6221
- FMA: 52797

The nasopalatine nerve (also Scarpa's nerve or long sphenopalatine nerve) is a nerve of the head. It is a sensory branch of the maxillary nerve (CN V_{2}) that passes through the pterygopalatine ganglion (without synapsing) and then through the sphenopalatine foramen to enter the nasal cavity, and finally out of the nasal cavity through the incisive canal and then the incisive fossa to enter the hard palate. It provides sensory innervation to the posteroinferior part of the nasal septum, and gingiva just posterior to the upper incisor teeth.

The nasopalatine nerve is the largest of the medial posterior superior nasal nerves.

== Structure ==
=== Course ===
It exits the pterygopalatine fossa through the sphenopalatine foramen to enter the nasal cavity. It passes across the roof of the nasal cavity below the orifice of the sphenoidal sinus to reach the posterior part of the nasal septum. It passes anteroinferiorly upon the nasal septum along a groove upon the vomer (the so-called vomerine groove or Scarpa's sulcus), running between the periosteum and mucous membrane of the lower part of the nasal septum. It then passes through the hard palate by descending through the incisive canal to reach the roof of the mouth.

=== Distribution ===
The nasopalatine nerve provides sensory innervation to the posteroinferior portion of the nasal septum, and the anterior-most portion of the hard palate (i.e. the gingiva/mucous membrane of the palate just posterior to the upper incisors).

=== Communications ===
The nasopalatine nerve communicates with the corresponding nerve of the opposite side and with the greater palatine nerve.

== Clinical significance ==
The nasopalatine nerve may be anaesthetised in order to perform surgery on the hard palate or the soft palate.

== History ==
The nasopalatine nerve was first identified by Domenico Cotugno.

== Additional images ==
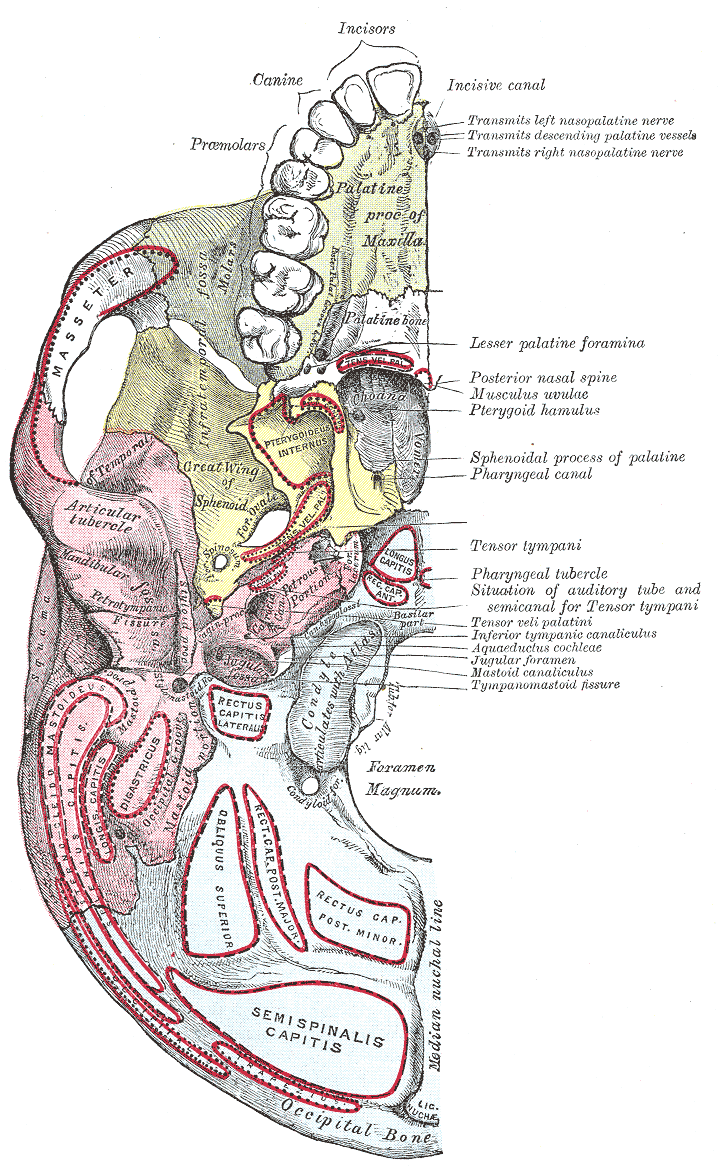
Base of skull. Inferior surface.

== See also ==
- Foramina of Scarpa
