= Tonsillar artery =

Tonsillar branch of the facial artery
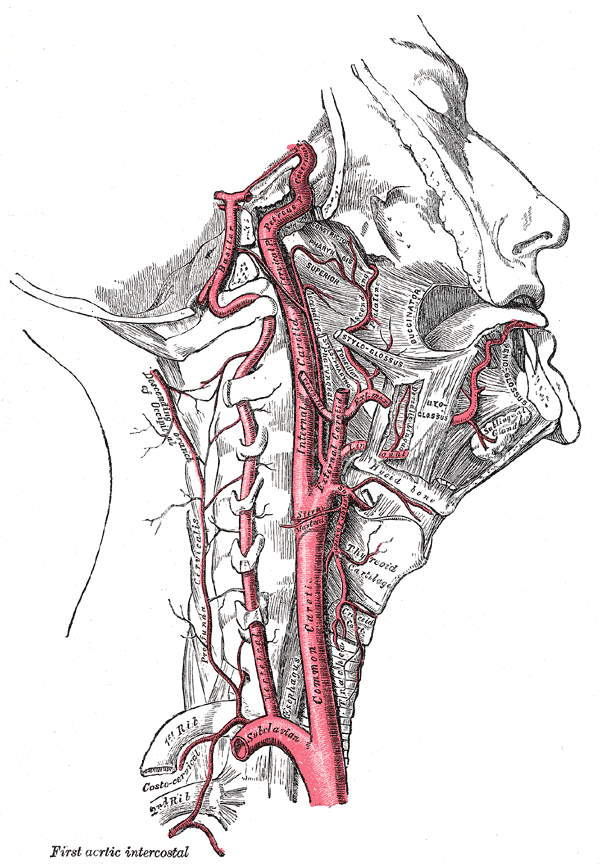
- The internal carotid and vertebral arteries. Right side. (Tonsillar labeled at center.)

Details
- Source: Facial artery

Identifiers
- Latin: ramus tonsillaris arteriae facialis
- TA98: A12.2.05.022
- TA2: 4390
- FMA: 49558

The tonsillar artery (or tonsillar branch of the facial artery) is (usually) a branch of the facial artery (though it sometimes arises from the ascending palatine artery instead) that represents the main source of arterial blood supply for the palatine tonsil.

The artery passes superior-ward between the medial pterygoid muscle and styloglossus muscle. Upon reaching the superior border of the styloglossus muscle, the tonsillar artery penetrates the superior pharyngeal constrictor muscle to enter the pharynx and reach the palatine tonsil. The artery then ramifies within the substance of the tonsil and musculature of the root of the tongue.
