= Palatine glands =

Details
- Location: Soft palate of the mouth

Identifiers
- Latin: glandulae palatinae
- TA98: A05.1.02.017
- TA2: 2816
- FMA: 71616

The palatine glands form a continuous layer on the posterior surface of the mucous membrane of the soft palate and around the uvula. They are pure mucous glands.

== Developmental ==
The development of the palatine glands begins at approximately the 11th week of intrauterine life with the formation of solid epithelial buds arising from the basal layer of the palatal epithelium. These epithelial cords first appear at the junction of the hard and soft palates and initially develop in the lateral regions before progressing medially. Gland formation is symmetrical on both sides of the palate and does not occur along the midline. Following initial budding, the epithelial cords elongate into the underlying mesenchyme, become flask-shaped, and undergo branching morphogenesis. Canalization of the cords occurs during this period, leading to the formation of the primitive ductal system and early acinar differentiation. Between 14th and 20th weeks of intrauterine life, the secretory end pieces and duct system become increasingly differentiated. Mucous acini predominate, with occasional mixed or serous acini appearing. Cytochemical staining demonstrates PAS-positive, alcianophilic, and metachromatic material within the acini and ducts, indicating active mucin synthesis during this stage. As development progresses, the palatine glands exhibit characteristic histophysiological features, including increasing glandular complexity, maturation of mucous acini, and accumulation of secretory material within the ductal lumina. These findings suggest that functional mucin secretion by the palatine glands begins before birth and continues to mature throughout fetal development.

== Anatomical structure ==
According to Céspedes, the palatine salivary glands are made up of many tubuloacinar secretory endpieces, which are found within the lamina propria and are supported by dense connective tissue at 7 days after the baby's birth. These glands are mainly mucous, although some serous cells are also present showing a mixed secretory structure. The polarity of secretory cells is evident, with nuclei basally positioned and secretory granules predominantly in the apical cytoplasm. Two granules were identified: electron-lucent granules that reflect mucous secretion and electron-dense granules that represent serous secretion. In the cytoplasm there are elaborate organelles such as mitochondria as well as rough endoplasmic reticulum and Golgi apparatus, located mostly in the supranuclear region, indicating active secretory activity. Functional differentiation is suggested by myoepithelial cells which cover the basal part of the acini and are associated with microfilaments, mitochondria and Golgi apparatus. There are desmosomal junctions and membrane interdigitations between the secretory and myoepithelial cells. The glandular epithelium is separated from the connective tissue by a distinct basal lamina lined by layers of electron-dense and electron-lucent components. The SEM also reveals the three-dimensional arrangement of irregularly-shaped endpieces and the structural connective tissue framework. However, the glands at this stage are organized structurally and functionally active, with mucous secretion predominating.

According to Mäkinen, the human palatine gland secretions (HPS) of adult patients were analyzed using direct samples from the palatal mucosa. This work aimed to characterize the chemical compounds and enzyme composition in these secretions, with comparison to mixed whole saliva samples. Palatine gland secretions from adult subjects contain high levels of glycoproteins and have been described in some papers by showing elevated levels of carbohydrates, hexosamines, and sialic acids. Such a feature is typical of mucin-rich secretions. In contrast to mixed saliva, palatine gland secretions lacked common salivary enzymes such as amylase, peroxidase, and lysozyme. However, they contained highly concentrated arylamidase enzymes. The conclusion drawn is that the secretion from palatine glands is chemically distinct from that of whole saliva and that palatine glands may have special biochemical functions, mainly on the basis of glycoprotein content and arylamidase activity.

== Histology ==
Palatine glands are minor salivary glands located under the mucous membrane non each side of the midline of the palate. Palatine glands have multiple histological features. The palatine glands are compound tubuloacinar minor salivary glands composed mainly of mucous-secreting acini. Being compound means they have a branched duct system, and tubuloacinar refers to the presence of both tubular and acinar secretory units. Histologically, the acini are predominantly mucous in nature, appearing pale with flattened basal nuclei due to mucin accumulation. Serous cells are few or absent, unlike the submandibular gland which is mixed but predominantly serous. Their mucous secretion primarily functions to lubricate the palatal mucosa during speech and swallowing.

Palatine gland is divided into lobules by thin connective tissue septa that contain blood vessels, nerves, and small ducts. The secretory units consist predominantly of mucous acini, which appear large and pale or foamy in hematoxylin and eosin staining due to the presence of mucin droplets. The mucous cells are pyramidal with flattened, basally located nuclei and a relatively wide lumen. Serous cells are very few or absent, and serous demilunes are rarely seen, unlike in the Submandibular gland. Myoepithelial cells are present between the secretory cells and the basal lamina; these contractile cells assist in expelling the viscous secretion into the duct system. The duct system is relatively simple and poorly developed compared to major salivary glands, with short intercalated ducts, poorly developed or absent striated ducts, and short excretory ducts that open directly onto the palatal mucosal surface. The continuous production of thick mucous secretion functions to lubricate and protect the palatal mucosa during mastication, speech, and swallowing.

== Functional and physiological role ==
Both major and minor salivary glands share the primary purpose of saliva production. Research utilizing Wistar rat models, often selected for their physiological similarity to humans, has highlighted key traits of these glands. Palatine glands are classified as minor salivary glands. A primary distinction between major and minor glands lies in the composition of their secretions, specifically the ratio of serous to mucous products. Furthermore, the anatomical proximity of salivary duct openings to taste buds has been shown to influence taste perception.

Minor salivary glands are typically located in the submucosa or between muscle fibers. They directly irrigate the mucosal tissue and contribute significantly to the total saliva composition, providing approximately 14% of salivary proteins and 1% of amylase. Specific minor glands, such as Von Ebner’s and Weber’s glands, are notable protein synthesizers that may play a role in taste perception. This salivary production is critical for protecting teeth from dental caries; consequently, glandular dysfunction, such as xerostomia (dry mouth), can lead to increased caries risk and other oral mucosal disorders.

== Surgical and dental relevance ==
In oral surgery, palatine glands are highly relevant during procedures such as palatal flap elevation, torus palatinus removal, cleft palate surgery, and excision of palatal lesions. Injury to these glands or their ducts during surgical manipulation can lead to mucoceles, postoperative inflammation, or delayed wound healing. Additionally, because the palatal mucosa is tightly bound to underlying bone, damage to glandular tissue may result in persistent discomfort or ulceration if not managed carefully. From a pathological standpoint, palatine glands are a common site for minor salivary gland tumors, including both benign (e.g., pleomorphic adenoma) and malignant lesions (e.g., mucoepidermoid carcinoma). The hard palate is one of the most frequent intraoral locations for malignant minor salivary gland tumors, making early recognition of palatal swellings, ulceration, or asymmetry crucial during routine dental examinations. In prosthodontics and orthodontics, awareness of palatine gland anatomy is essential when designing maxillary dentures or palatal appliances. Excessive pressure over gland-rich areas can impair salivary flow, leading to mucosal irritation, soreness, and reduced patient comfort. Proper relief in denture design helps preserve gland function and maintain mucosal health.

== Pathology ==
Neoplasms arising from palatine glands originate from the minor salivary glands of the hard palate and represent a significant proportion of intraoral salivary gland tumors. Minor salivary glands show a higher proportion of malignant tumors compared with major salivary glands. Clinically, pathology of the palatine glands may present as palatal swelling, submucosal nodules, or ulcerated lesions (Neville et al., 2016). Among benign tumors, pleomorphic adenoma is the most common neoplasm affecting minor salivary glands of the palate. These tumors typically present as painless, slow-growing masses beneath intact mucosa. Histologically, pleomorphic adenomas demonstrate a mixture of ductal epithelial and myoepithelial cells within a pleomorphic stromal background that may appear myxoid, chondroid, or hyalinized. Among malignant tumors, adenoid cystic carcinoma is frequently reported. This tumor is characterized by slow growth but aggressive clinical behavior, including perineural invasion, local recurrence, and distant metastasis. Histopathologically, adenoid cystic carcinoma commonly demonstrates cribriform, tubular, or solid growth patterns, with the cribriform pattern being the most characteristic feature. Another rare malignant tumor of the palatine glands is clear cell carcinoma, which is composed of tumor cells with clear cytoplasm arranged in nests or cords. Because several salivary gland tumors may exhibit clear cells, histopathological and immunohistochemical analysis are necessary for accurate diagnosis (Sanjai et al., 2018).

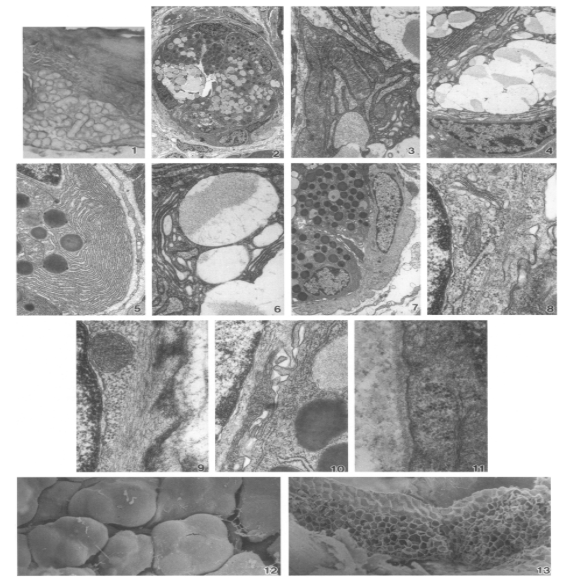
Figure 1–13 (Céspedes et al., 2002).

Figure 1–13: Ultrastructural features of palatine salivary glands observed using light microscopy, transmission electron microscopy (TEM), and scanning electron microscopy (SEM), demonstrating mucous and serous secretory granules, myoepithelial cells, basal lamina, and the three-dimensional arrangement of secretory endpieces (Céspedes et al., 2002).

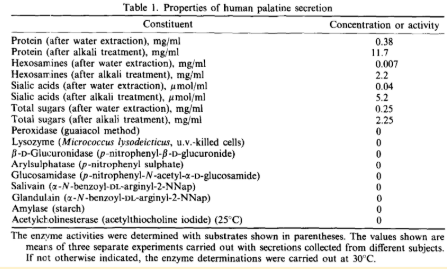
Table 1 (K.K.Makinen et al.).

Table 1 demonstrates that human palatine gland secretions contain high concentrations of glycoproteins. The levels of protein, hexosamines, sialic acids, and total sugars were significantly higher following alkali extraction compared with water extraction, suggesting that many of these components are strongly bound within complex mucin structures and require chemical disruption for accurate measurement. Elevated levels of hexosamines and sialic acids indicate a high mucin content, supporting the protective and lubricating role of palatine gland secretions in the oral cavity. In contrast, several enzymes commonly present in mixed saliva—including amylase, peroxidase, lysozyme, β-glucuronidase, arylsulphatase, glucosaminidase, salivain, glandulain, and acetylcholinesterase—were not detected. The absence of these enzymes suggests that palatine gland secretions are biochemically distinct from whole saliva and are not contaminated by secretions from the major salivary glands.

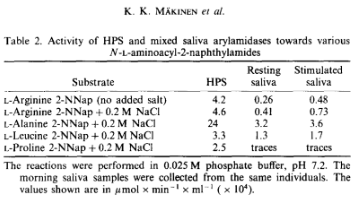
Table 2 K.K.Makinen et al.).

Table 2 compares arylamidase activity in human palatine gland secretions, resting mixed saliva, and stimulated mixed saliva. Palatine gland secretions showed significantly higher arylamidase activity than both resting and stimulated saliva for most substrates tested. The hydrolysis of L-alanine-2-naphthylamide was particularly pronounced, indicating a degree of enzymatic specificity in palatine secretions. The variation in enzymatic activity between palatine secretion and mixed saliva confirms that the samples represent true palatine gland secretion rather than contamination, suggesting that arylamidases may play a specialized functional role in the oral cavity.
