= Greater palatine artery =

Artery

Details
- Source: Descending palatine artery

Identifiers
- Latin: arteria palatina major
- TA98: A12.2.05.085
- TA2: 4457
- FMA: 49795

The greater palatine artery is a branch of the descending palatine artery (a terminal branch of the maxillary artery) and contributes to the blood supply of the hard palate and nasal septum.

== Course ==
The descending palatine artery branches off of the maxillary artery in the pterygopalatine fossa and descends through the greater palatine canal along with the greater palatine nerve (from the pterygopalatine ganglion). Once emerging from the greater palatine foramen, it changes names to the greater palatine artery and begins to supply the hard palate. As it terminates it travels through the incisive canal to anastomose with the sphenopalatine artery to supply the nasal septum.

== See also ==
- Greater palatine nerve
