= Palatoglossal arch =

Arch of the palate

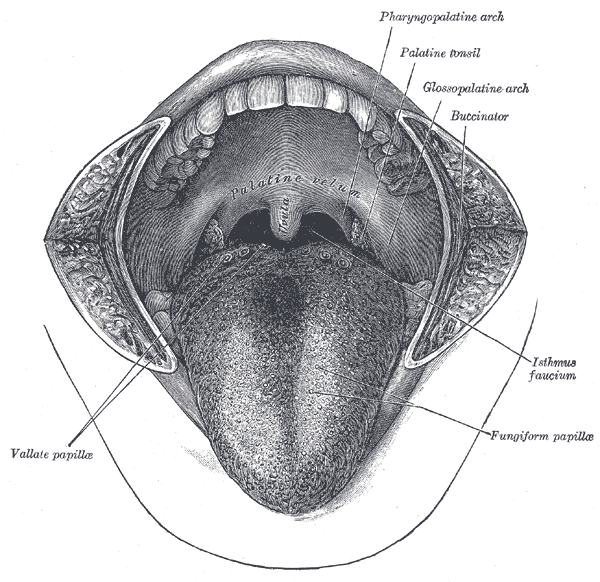
- The mouth cavity. The cheeks have been slit transversely and the tongue pulled forward. (Glossopalatine arch labeled at upper right.)

Details

Identifiers
- Latin: arcus palatoglossus, arcus glossopalatinus
- TA98: A05.2.01.005
- TA2: 2847
- FMA: 55024

The palatoglossal arch (glossopalatine arch, anterior pillar of fauces) on either side runs downward, lateral (to the side), and forward to the side of the base of the tongue, and is formed by the projection of the glossopalatine muscle with its covering mucous membrane. It is the anterior border of the isthmus of the fauces and marks the border between the mouth and the palatopharyngeal arch. The latter marks the beginning of the pharynx.
