= Palatopharyngeal arch =

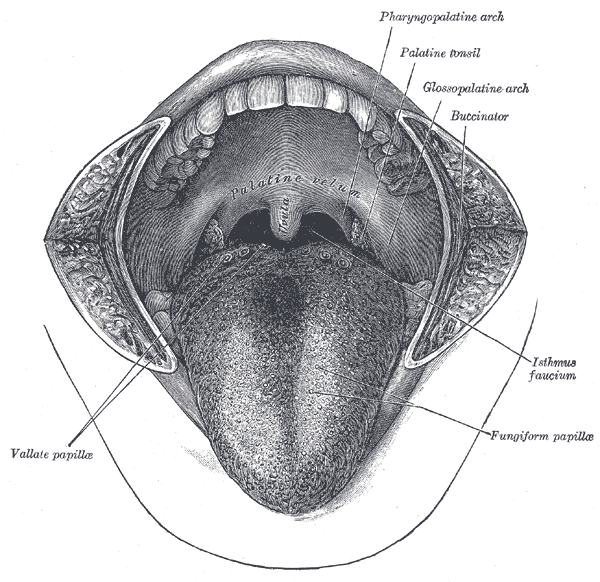
- The mouth cavity. The cheeks have been slit transversely and the tongue pulled forward. (Pharyngopalatine arch labeled at upper right.)

Details

Identifiers
- Latin: arcus palatopharyngeus, arcus pharyngopalatinus
- TA98: A05.2.01.007
- TA2: 2849
- FMA: 55025

The palatopharyngeal arch (pharyngopalatine arch, posterior pillar of fauces) is larger and projects further toward the middle line than the palatoglossal arch; it runs downward, lateralward, and backward to the side of the pharynx, and is formed by the projection of the palatopharyngeal muscle, covered by mucous membrane.
