= Incisive foramen =

Opening of the incisive canals on the hard palate immediately behind the incisor teeth

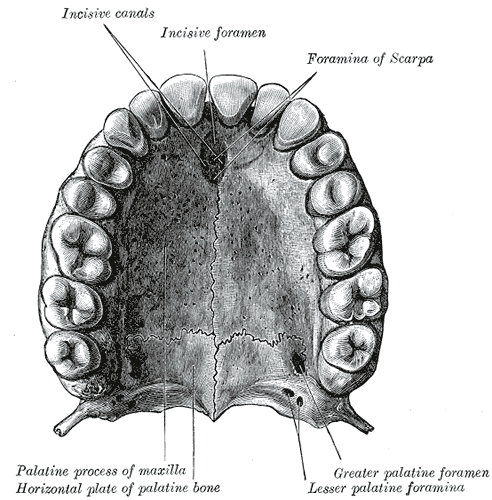
- The bony palate and alveolar arch.

Details
- Part of: Hard palate

Identifiers
- Latin: foramen incisivum
- TA98: A02.1.00.060
- TA2: 464
- FMA: 57737 75305, 57737

In the human mouth, the incisive foramen (also known as: "anterior palatine foramen", or "nasopalatine foramen") is the opening of the incisive canals on the hard palate immediately behind the incisor teeth. It gives passage to blood vessels and nerves. The incisive foramen is situated within the incisive fossa of the maxilla.

The incisive foramen is used as an anatomical landmark for defining the severity of cleft lip and cleft palate.

The incisive foramen exists in a variety of species.

== Structure ==
The incisive foramen is a funnel-shaped opening in the bone of the oral hard palate representing the inferior termination of the incisive canal. An oral prominence - the incisive papilla - overlies the incisive fossa.

The incisive foramen is situated immediately behind the incisor teeth, and in between the two premaxillae.

=== Contents ===
The incisive foramen allows for blood vessels and nerves to pass. These include:

- the pterygopalatine nerves to the hard palate.
- the nasopalatine nerves from the floor of the nasal cavity.
- the sopalatine branches of the infratrochlear nerve, a branch of the ophthalmic nerve (V1), itself a branch of the trigeminal nerve.
- the sphenopalatine artery supplying the mucous membrane covering the hard palate of the mouth.
- the sphenopalatine vein draining the mucous membrane covering the hard palate of the mouth.

== Clinical significance ==
As many nerves exit the incisive canal at the incisive foramen, it may be used for injection of local anaesthetic.

When plain radiographs are taken of the mouth, the incisive foramen may be mistaken for a periapical lesion.

The incisive foramen can be used as a landmark when describing cleft lip and cleft palate, which can either extend in front of (primary) or behind (secondary) the foramen. It is also important as a surgical landmark to avoid damaging its nerves and vascular structures.

== History ==
The incisive foramen is also known as the anterior palatine foramen, the nasopalatine foramen, and the incisive fossa.

== Other animals ==
In many other species, the incisive foramina allow for passage of ducts to the vomeronasal organ. It can be found in cats, and alligators.

== Additional images ==
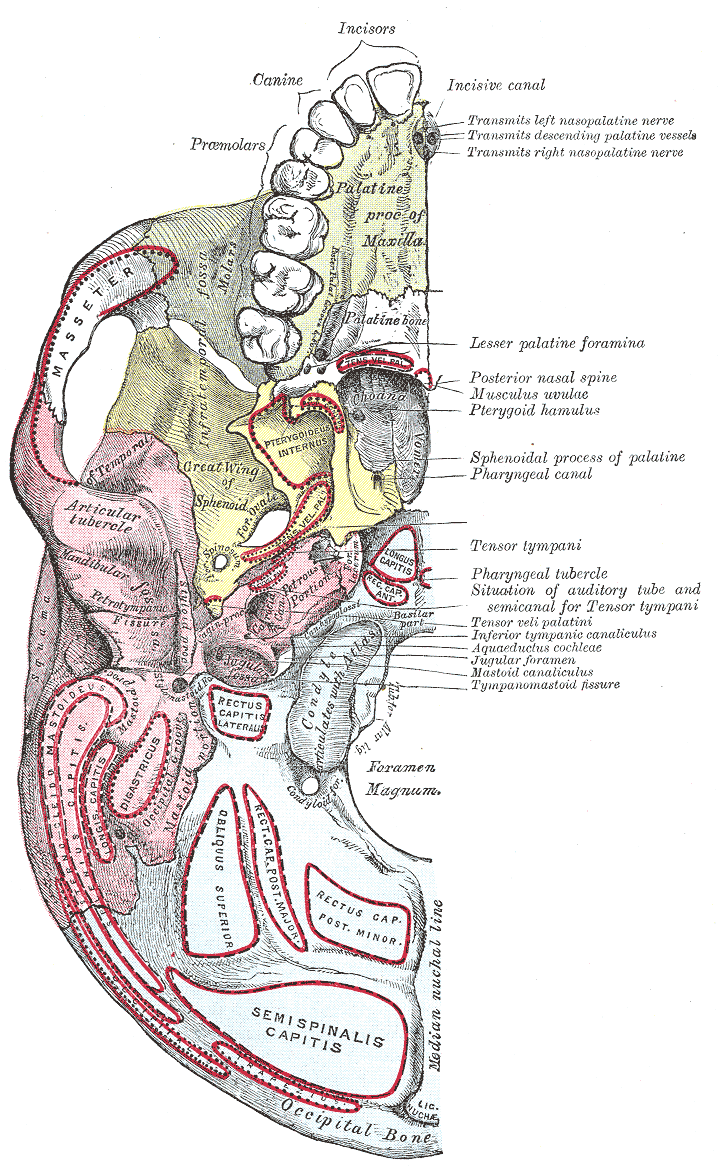
Inferior surface of base of skull

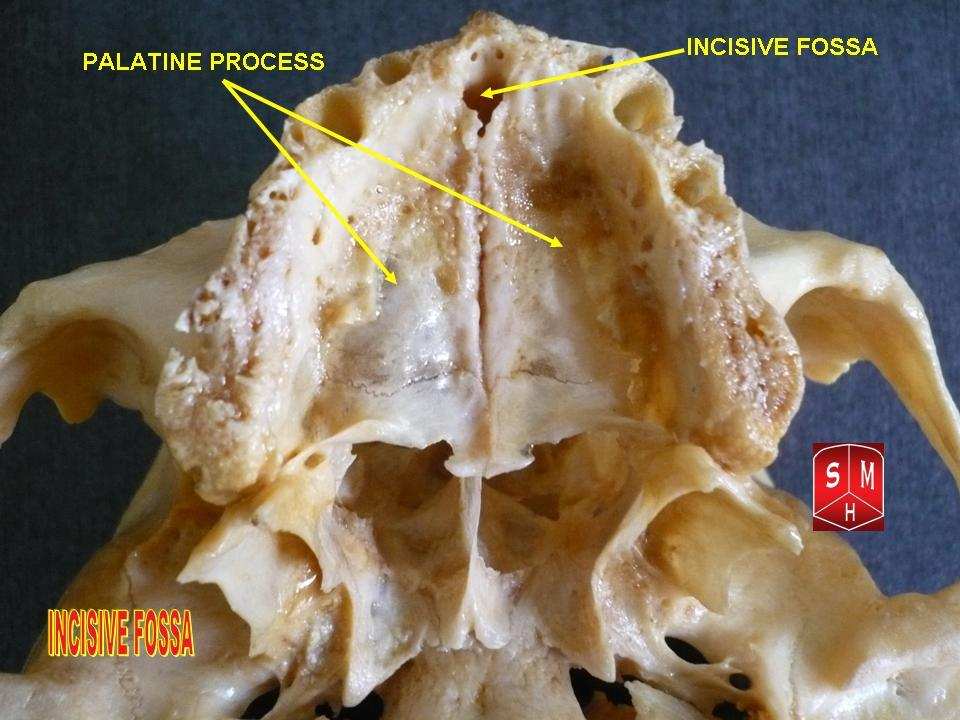
Incisive fossa
