= Arterial tree =

All arteries of human body

In anatomy, arterial tree is used to refer to all arteries and/or the branching pattern of the arteries. This article regards the human arterial tree. Starting from the aorta:

the following are the parts

== Ascending aorta ==
It is a portion of the aorta commencing at the upper part of the base of the left ventricle, on a level with the lower border of the third costal cartilage behind the left half of the sternum.

=== Right coronary artery ===
- posterior interventricular artery (mostly)
- SA nodal artery (in 60%)
- Right marginal artery

=== Left coronary artery ===
- anterior interventricular
  - septal
  - diagonal
- circumflex
  - SA nodal artery (in 40%)
  - posterior interventricular artery (occasionally)
  - Left marginal arteries
  - posterolateral artery
- ramus intermedius (sometimes)

== Aortic arch ==
=== brachiocephalic artery ===
- right common carotid artery
- right subclavian artery

=== left common carotid artery (directly from arch of aorta on left mostly) ===
==== internal carotid artery ====
- ophthalmic artery
  - Orbital group
    - Lacrimal artery
      - lateral palpebral arteries
      - zygomatic branches
      - recurrent branch
    - Supraorbital artery
      - superficial branch
      - deep branch
    - Posterior ethmoidal artery
      - meningeal branch
      - nasal branches
    - Anterior ethmoidal artery
      - anterior meningeal artery
      - nasal branches
      - superior palpebral arch
      - inferior palpebral arch
    - Supratrochlear artery
    - Dorsal nasal artery
      - twig to the upper part of lacrimal sac
      - to root of nose
      - dorsum of the nose
  - Ocular group
    - Long posterior ciliary arteries
      - Circulus arteriosus major
      - Circulus arteriosus minor
    - Short posterior ciliary arteries
    - Anterior ciliary artery
    - Central retinal artery
    - Muscular artery
- anterior cerebral artery
- middle cerebral artery
  - anterolateral central arteries
    - internal striate
    - external striate
- posterior communicating artery

==== external carotid artery ====
- Arising in carotid triangle
  - Superior thyroid artery
    - Hyoid (infrahyoid) artery
    - Sternocleidomastoid artery
    - Superior laryngeal artery
    - Cricothyroid artery
  - Ascending pharyngeal artery
  - Lingual artery
  - Facial artery
    - cervical
      - Ascending palatine artery
      - Tonsillar branch
      - Submental artery
        - superficial branch
        - deep branch
      - Glandular branches
    - facial
      - Inferior labial artery
      - Superior labial artery
      - Lateral nasal branch
      - Angular artery - the terminal branch
  - Occipital artery
- Posterior auricular artery
- Terminal branches
  - Maxillary artery
    - First portion
      - Deep auricular artery
      - Anterior tympanic artery
      - Middle meningeal artery
        - anterior and posterior
          - ophthalmic artery (very rarely)
          - superior tympanic artery
          - vessels to semilunar ganglion
          - superficial petrosal branch
          - Orbital branches
          - Temporal branches
      - Inferior alveolar artery
        - incisor branch
        - mental branch
        - lingual branch
        - mylohyoid branch
      - Accessory meningeal artery
    - Second portion
      - Masseteric artery
      - Pterygoid branches
      - Deep temporal arteries (anterior and posterior)
      - Buccal artery
    - Third portion
      - Sphenopalatine artery, terminal branch
        - posterior lateral nasal branches
        - posterior septal branches
      - Descending palatine artery
        - greater palatine artery
        - lesser palatine arteries
      - Infraorbital artery
        - orbital branches
        - anterior superior alveolar arteries
      - Posterior superior alveolar artery
      - branches to alveolar canals
      - branches to gingiva
      - Pharyngeal artery
      - Artery of pterygoid canal
  - Superficial temporal artery
    - Transverse facial artery
    - Middle temporal artery
    - Anterior auricular branch
    - frontal branch
    - parietal branch

=== Left subclavian artery (directly from arch of aorta on left) ===
==== vertebral artery ====
- Meningeal branches of vertebral artery
- Posterior spinal artery
  - ascending branch
  - descending branch
- Anterior spinal artery
- Posterior inferior cerebellar artery
  - medial branch
  - lateral branch
- Basilar artery
  - Anterior inferior cerebellar artery
    - labyrinthine artery
  - pontine branches

==== internal thoracic artery ====
- Mediastinal branches
- Thymic branches
- Pericardiophrenic artery
- Sternal branches
- Perforating branches
- six anterior intercostal branches
  - upper branches
  - lower branches of the space anastomoses
- Musculophrenic artery
  - intercostal branches (three)
  - branches to lower part of the pericardium
  - branches to diaphragm
  - branches to abdominal muscles
- Superior epigastric artery

==== thyrocervical trunk ====
- inferior thyroid artery
- suprascapular artery
- transverse cervical artery
  - Superficial branch
  - Deep branch/Dorsal scapular artery (sometimes)

==== costocervical trunk ====
- Deep cervical artery
- Supreme intercostal artery
  - 1st and 2nd posterior intercostal artery

==== Axillary artery ====
- Superior thoracic artery
- Thoracoacromial artery
  - acromial
  - pectoral
  - clavicular
  - deltoid
- Lateral thoracic artery
- Subscapular artery
- Anterior humeral circumflex artery
- Posterior humeral circumflex artery

==== Brachial artery ====
- Profunda brachii artery
  - radial collateral artery
  - medial collateral artery
  - branches to the deltoid muscle
- Superior ulnar collateral artery
  - Posterior ulnar recurrent artery
- Inferior ulnar collateral artery
  - Ascending branches
  - Descending branches
- radial artery
  - radial branches in the forearm
  - Radial recurrent artery
  - Palmar carpal branch of radial artery
  - Superficial palmar branch of the radial artery
  - radial branches at the wrist
  - Dorsal carpal branch of radial artery
  - First dorsal metacarpal artery
  - radial branches in the hand
  - Princeps pollicis artery
  - Radialis indicis
  - Deep palmar arch
- ulnar artery
  - anterior ulnar recurrent artery
  - posterior ulnar recurrent artery
  - common interosseous artery
  - posterior interosseous artery
    - interosseous recurrent artery
  - anterior interosseous artery
    - muscular branches
    - nutrient arteries of radius and ulna
    - branch to volar carpal network
  - muscular artery
  - volar carpal
  - palmar carpal arch
  - dorsal carpal
  - dorsal carpal arch
  - deep volar
  - superficial volar arch

== Thoracic aorta ==
- bronchial arteries
- esophageal arteries
- mediastinal branches
- pericardial arteries
- Lower 9(3rd to 11th) posterior intercostal arteries
- subcostal arteries
- superior phrenic arteries

== Abdominal aorta ==
=== celiac ===
- left gastric artery
  - hepatic branch
  - oesophageal branch
- common hepatic artery
  - proper hepatic artery
    - Terminal branches
      - right hepatic artery
        - Cystic artery
      - left hepatic artery
    - right gastric artery
  - gastroduodenal artery
    - right gastro-omental artery
    - superior pancreaticoduodenal artery
- splenic artery
  - dorsal pancreatic artery
  - short gastric arteries
  - left gastro-omental artery
  - Bühler's anastomotic artery

=== superior mesenteric ===
- inferior pancreaticoduodenal artery
- middle colic artery
- right colic artery
- intestinal arteries
- ileocolic artery

=== renal ===
==== Anterior and posterior ====
===== interlobar artery =====
- arcuate artery
  - interlobular artery
    - afferent arteriole
    - efferent arteriole
      - descending vasa recta
      - peritubular capillaries

=== gonadal ===
- testicular artery in males
- ovarian artery in females

=== inferior mesenteric ===
- left colic artery
  - ascending branch
  - descending branch
- sigmoid arteries
- superior rectal artery

== Common iliac arteries ==
=== Internal iliac artery ===
==== Anterior division ====
- obturator artery
- superior vesical artery
- Vaginal artery (females) / inferior vesical artery (males)
- middle rectal artery
- internal pudendal artery
  - inferior rectal artery
  - perineal artery
  - posterior scrotal branches in males/posterior labial branches in females
  - urethral artery
  - artery of bulb of penis in males / artery of bulb of vestibule in females
  - dorsal artery of penis in males / dorsal artery of clitoris in females
  - deep artery of penis in males / deep artery of clitoris in females
- inferior gluteal artery
  - Accompanying artery of ischiadic nerve
- Uterine artery (females) / deferential artery (males)
  - Vaginal artery (sometimes)
- (obliterated) umbilical artery

==== Posterior division ====
- iliolumbar artery
  - Lumbar branch
  - Iliac branch
- lateral sacral artery
  - Superior
  - Inferior
- superior gluteal artery
  - Superficial branch
  - Deep branch

=== external iliac artery ===
- Inferior epigastric artery
- Deep circumflex iliac artery
- femoral artery
  - superficial epigastric artery
  - Superficial circumflex iliac artery
  - Superficial external pudendal artery
  - Deep external pudendal artery
  - Deep femoral artery
    - Lateral femoral circumflex artery
      - ascending branch
      - descending branch
      - transverse branch
    - Medial femoral circumflex artery
      - ascending branch
      - descending branch
        - superficial branch
        - deep branch
        - acetabular branch
    - Perforating arteries
      - first perforating artery
      - second perforating artery
      - third/fourth perforating artery
  - Descending genicular artery
    - Saphenous branch
    - Musculo-articular branch

==== Popliteal artery ====
- anterior tibial artery
  - post. tibial recurrent artery
  - ant. tibial recurrent artery
  - muscular branches
  - anterior medial malleolar artery
  - anterior lateral malleolar artery
  - Dorsalis pedis artery
- posterior tibial artery
  - fibular artery (sometimes from popliteal artery)
    - communicating branch to the anterior tibial artery
    - perforating branch to the posterior tibial artery
  - medial plantar artery
  - lateral plantar artery
- sural artery
- medial superior genicular artery
  - Branch to vastus medialis
  - Branch to surface of the femur and the knee-joint
- lateral superior genicular artery
  - superficial branch
  - deep branch
- middle genicular artery
- medial inferior genicular artery
  - branch to popliteus
- lateral inferior genicular artery

== See also ==
- Family tree of major arteries
