= Orbital artery =

Orbital artery may refer to:

- Infraorbital artery
- Supraorbital artery
- Zygomatico-orbital artery
