= Palpebral arteries =

Palpebral arteries may refer to:

- Lateral palpebral arteries
- Medial palpebral arteries
