= Dorsal nasal artery =

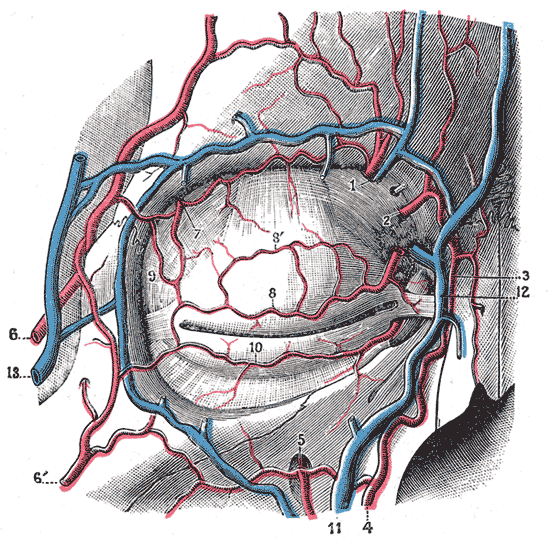
- Bloodvessels of the eyelids, front view. 1, supraorbital artery and supraorbital vein; 2, nasal artery; 3, angular artery, the terminal branch of 4, the facial artery; 5, suborbital artery; 6, anterior branch of the superficial temporal artery; 6’, malar branch of the transverse artery of the face; 7, lacrimal artery; 8, superior palpebral artery with 8’, its external arch; 9, anastomoses of the superior palpebral with the superficial temporal and lacrimal; 10, inferior palpebral artery; 11, facial vein; 12, angular vein; 13, branch of the superficial temporal vein.

Details
- Source: Ophthalmic artery
- Branches: Twig to the upper part of the lacrimal sac to root of the nose dorsum of the nose

Identifiers
- Latin: arteria dorsalis nasi
- TA98: A12.2.06.049
- TA2: 4500
- FMA: 50000

The dorsal nasal artery is an artery of the face. It is one of the two terminal branches of the ophthalmic artery. It contributes arterial supply to the lacrimal sac, and outer surface of the nose.

== Structure ==
=== Origin ===
The dorsal nasal artery is one of the two terminal branches of the ophthalmic artery (the other being the supratrochlear artery). It arises in the superomedial orbit.

=== Course and relations ===
It passes anteriorly to exit the orbit between the trochlea (superiorly), the medial palpebral ligament (inferiorly). It gives a branch to the lacrimal sac before bifurcating into two branches: one branch anastomoses with the terminal (angular) part of the facial artery and is important for the blood supply of the face; the other travels along the dorsum of the nose to supply the outer surface of the nose, and forms anastomoses with its contralateral fellow, and with the lateral nasal branch of the facial artery.

=== Distribution ===
The dorsal nasal artery contributes arterial supply to the lacrimal sac, and the outer surface of the nose.

In around 20% of individuals, it also supplies the tip of the nose.
