= Glandular branches =

Glandular branches can refer to:

- Glandular branches of facial artery (rami glandulares arteriae facialis)
- Glandular branches of the superior thyroid artery (rami glandulares arteriae thyroideae superioris)
- Glandular branches of the inferior thyroid artery (rami glandulares arteriae thyroideae inferioris)
