= Submental =

Submental (below the chin) can refer to:

- Submental artery, a branch of the facial artery
- Submental triangle, a division of the anterior triangle of the neck
- Submental lymph nodes
