= Lateral nasal branch of facial artery =

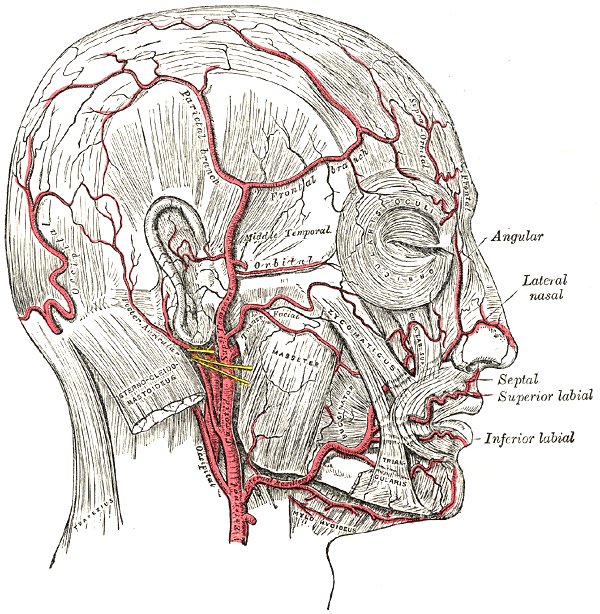
- The arteries of the face and scalp. (Lateral nasal labeled at center right.)

Details
- Source: facial artery
- Supplies: ala and dorsum of the nose

Identifiers
- Latin: ramus lateralis nasi arteriae facialis
- TA98: A12.2.05.028
- TA2: 4396
- FMA: 49580

The lateral nasal branch of facial artery (lateral nasal artery) is derived from the facial artery as that vessel ascends along the side of the nose.

== Supplies ==
It supplies the ala and dorsum of the nose, anastomosing with its fellow superior labial artery (septal and alar branches), with the dorsal nasal branch of the ophthalmic artery, and with the infraorbital branch of the internal maxillary. If the posterior lateral nasal artery is superficial in the nasal wall, a laceration may occur during an aggressive curettage. A sinus floor elevation procedure requires a separation and elevation of the sinus lining with subsequent introduction of space maintaining graft material. During the lining elevation this artery may be cut in the osseous nasal wall.

== Additional images ==
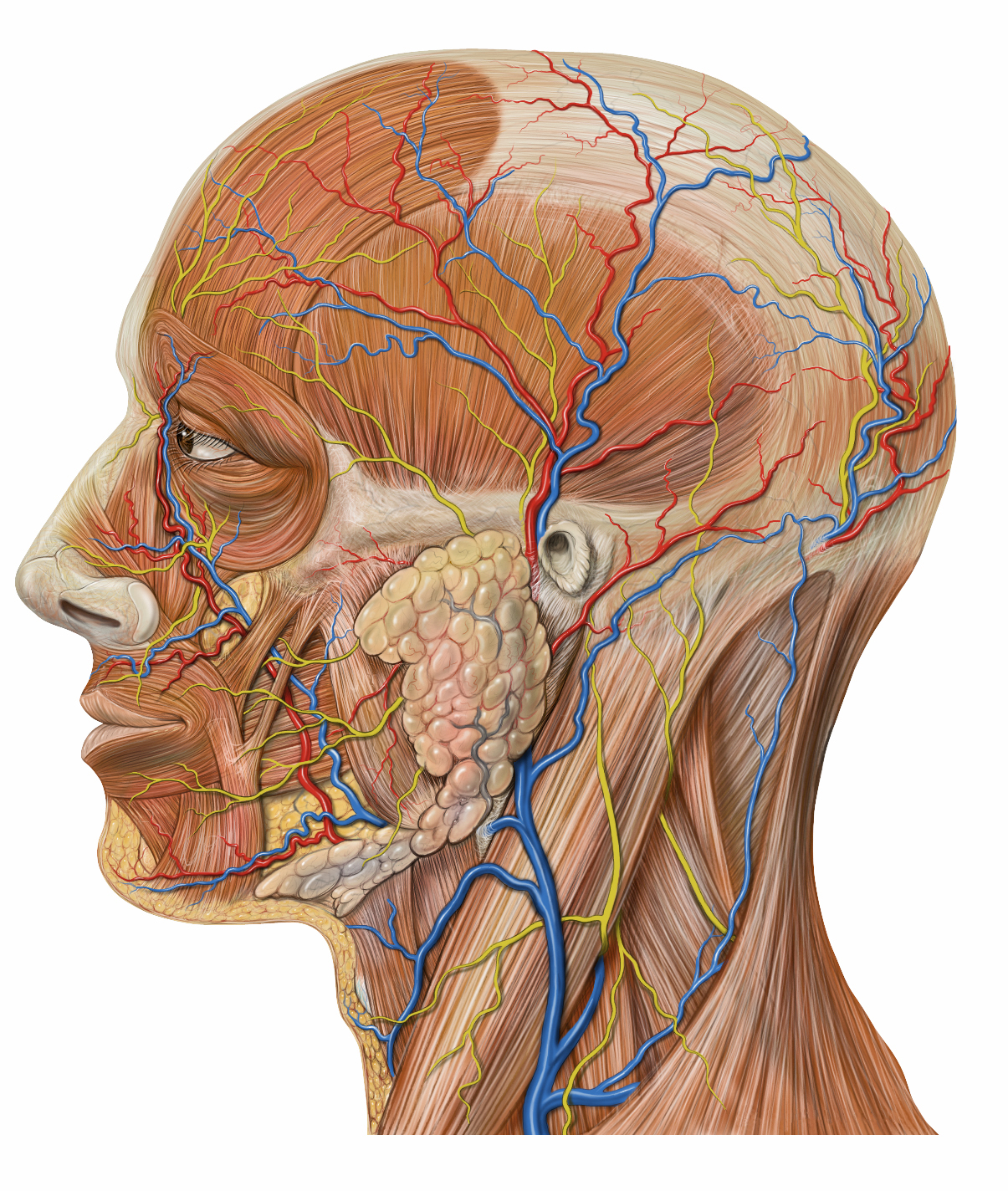
Lateral head anatomy detail

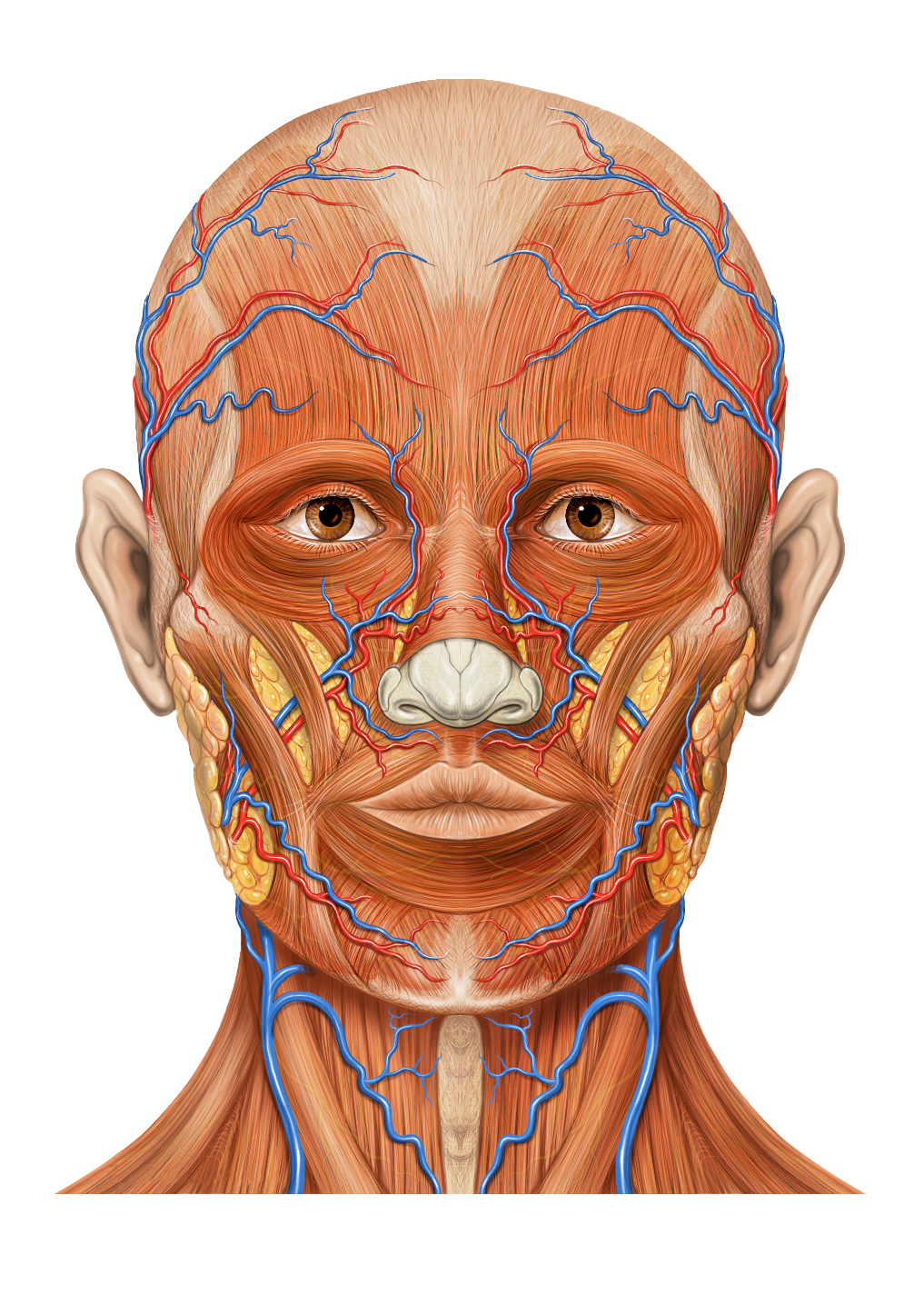
Head anatomy anterior view
