= Platysma muscle =

Human neck muscle

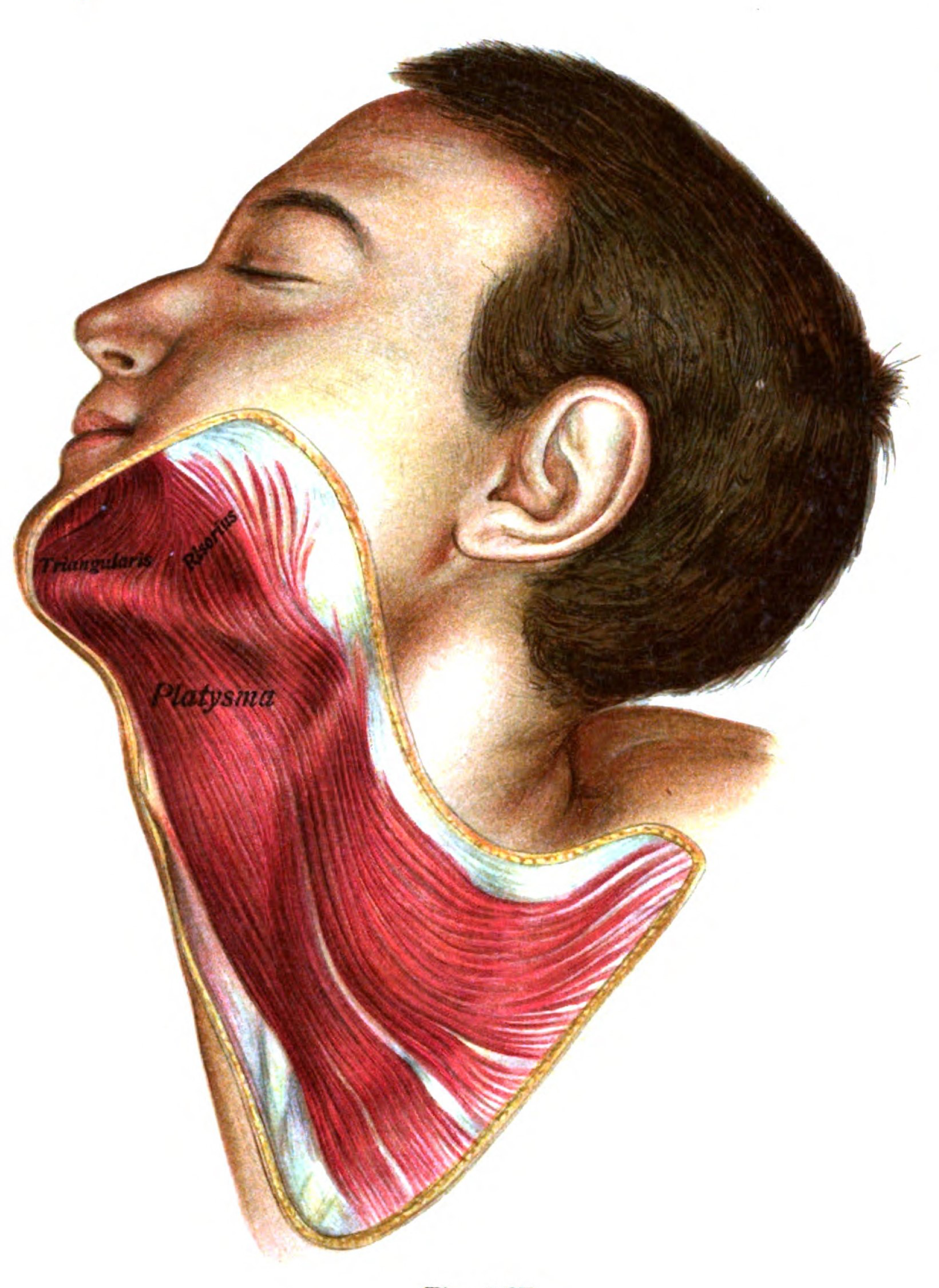
- The platysma is visible, with skin removed.

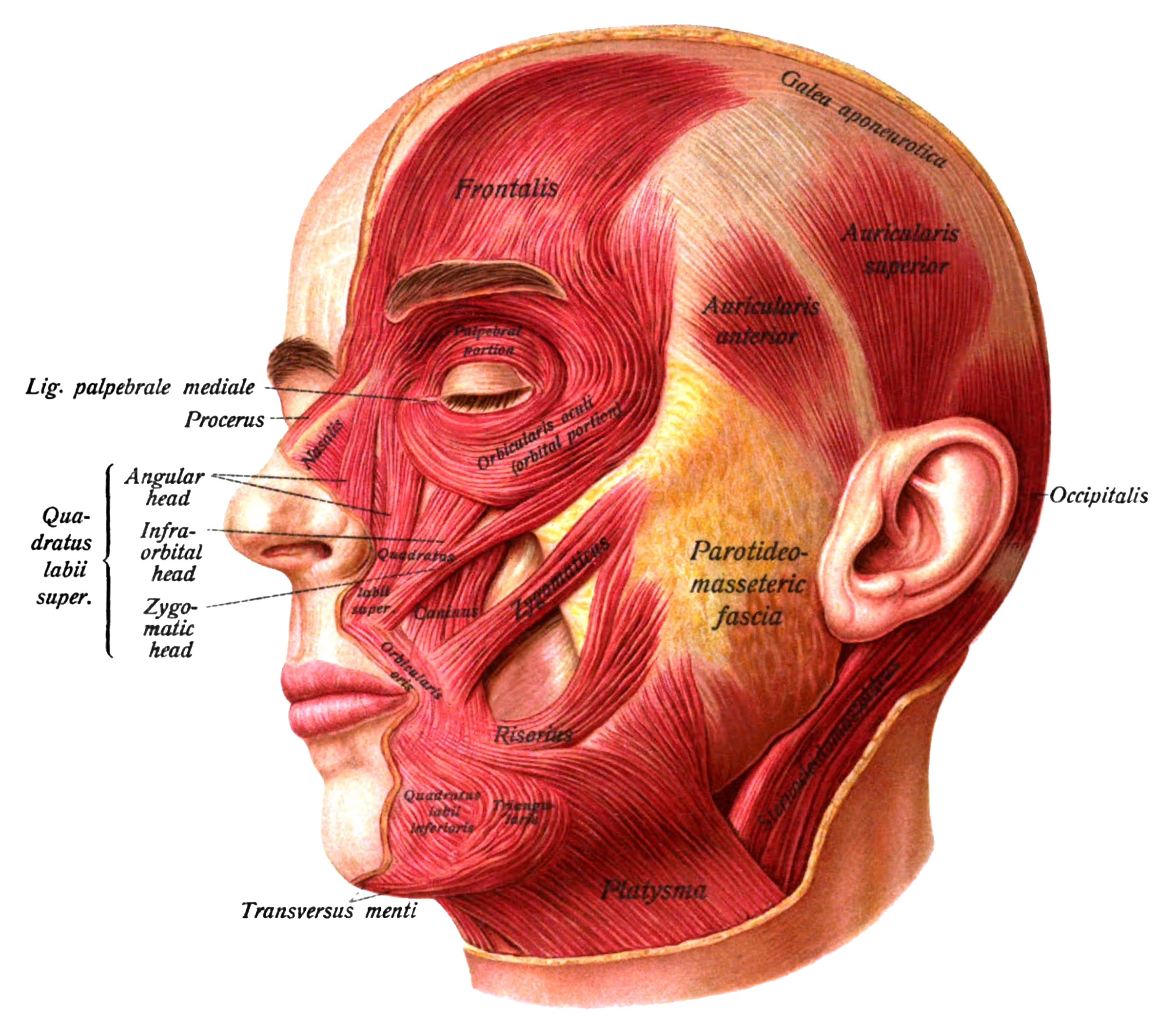
- The muscles of the face, platysma visible at bottom right.

Details
- Origin: Subcutaneous tissue of infraclavicular and supraclavicular regions
- Insertion: Base of mandible; skin of cheek and lower lip; angle of mouth; orbicularis oris
- Artery: Branches of the submental artery and suprascapular artery
- Nerve: Cervical branch of the facial nerve
- Actions: Draws the corners of the mouth inferiorly and widens it (as in expressions of sadness and fright). Also draws the skin of the neck superiorly when teeth are clenched
- Antagonist: Masseter muscle, temporalis muscle

Identifiers
- Latin: platysma
- TA98: A04.2.01.001
- TA2: 2147
- FMA: 45738

The platysma muscle or platysma is a superficial muscle of the human neck that overlaps the sternocleidomastoid muscle. It covers the anterior surface of the neck superficially. When it contracts, it produces a slight wrinkling of the neck, and a "bowstring" effect on either side of the neck.

== Etymology ==
First recorded in the period 1685–1695, the word comes via Neo-Latin from Greek plátysma, a plate, literally, something wide and flat, equivalent to platý(nein), to widen, + -sma, a variant of the resultative suffix -ma. The botanist William T. Stearn argues that platýs, "in Greek compound words, usually signifies broad, rarely flat," which describes the platysma's broad sheet of muscle.

== Structure ==
The platysma muscle is a broad sheet of muscle arising from the fascia covering the upper parts of the pectoralis major muscle and deltoid muscle. Its fibers cross the clavicle, and proceed obliquely upward and medially along the side of the neck. This leaves the inferior part of the neck in the midline deficient of significant muscle cover.

Fibres at the front of the muscle from the left and right sides intermingle together below and behind the mandibular symphysis, the junction where the two lateral halves of the mandible are fused at an early period of life (although not a true symphysis). Fibres at the back of the muscle cross the mandible, some being inserted into the bone below the oblique line, others into the skin and subcutaneous tissue of the lower part of the face. Many of these fibers blend with the muscles about the angle and lower part of the mouth.

Sometimes fibers can be traced to the zygomaticus major muscle, or to the margin of the orbicularis oris muscle. Beneath the platysma, the external jugular vein descends from the angle of the mandible to the clavicle.

=== Nerve supply ===
The platysma muscle is supplied by the cervical branch of the facial nerve.

=== Blood supply ===
The platysma muscle is supplied by branches of the submental artery and suprascapular artery.

=== Relations ===
The platysma muscle lies just deep to the subcutaneous fascia and fat. It covers many structures found deeper in the neck, such as the external carotid artery, the external jugular vein, the parotid gland, the lesser occipital nerve, the great auricular nerve, and the marginal mandibular branch of the facial nerve.

=== Variation ===
Variations occur in the extension over the face and over the clavicle and shoulder. The platysma muscle may be absent or interdigitate with the muscle of the opposite side in front of the neck; attachment to clavicle, mastoid process or occipital bone occurs. A more or less independent fasciculus, the occipitalis minor muscle, may extend from the fascia over the trapezius muscle to fascia over the insertion of the sternocleidomastoid muscle.

== Function ==
=== Wrinkling ===
When the entire platysma muscle is in action, it produces a slight wrinkling of the surface of the skin of the neck in an oblique direction (at an angle to the midline). It creates a distinctive "bowstring" effect on either side of the neck, where fibres move away from the midline.

=== Jaw and lip movement ===
The anterior portion of the platysma muscle, the thickest part of the muscle, depresses the lower jaw. It also draws down the lower lip and angle of the mouth in a frown. However, the platysma muscle plays only a minor role in depressing the lower lip, which is primarily performed by the depressor anguli oris muscle and the depressor labii inferioris muscle.

== Clinical significance ==
In a similar fashion to other muscles, the platysma muscle is vulnerable to tears, strains and muscle atrophy, among many other possible conditions.

=== Injury ===
The platysma muscle is vulnerable to neck injuries that may penetrate it, as it is both superficial and thin. Penetrating trauma in the neck injuries can be defined as any that completely penetrate the platysma muscle, making it an important landmark. Computed tomography angiography may be used to visualise arteries and veins, such as for complex injuries from gunshot wounds or stab wounds, and is useful to image any damage to the muscle. This minimises the number of exploratory surgeries that need to be performed, thus improving the handling of the condition.

=== Neck surgery ===
When neck surgery is performed, the platysma muscle usually needs to be cut through to access deeper structures. Fibres need to be sutured together accurately to prevent abnormal scar retraction, which may look unsightly.

=== Plastic surgery ===
Wrinkly skin of the neck caused by decrease in muscle tone leading to thinning and shortening of muscle is the secondary complication of facial nerve palsy and can be associated with the normal aging process. Neck bands in the area above the platysma muscle become most noticeable with age. These may be aggravated by weightlifting or facelift procedures. This may be known as platysma dyskinesia or "turkey neck".

Conservative management may be used. Alternatively, interventions include botulinum toxin injection and platysmaplasty. Platysmaplasty is a surgery in this area, that can be open or closed; in the latter a specialised instrument called a plastymotome is used that allows the surgery to be done without incisions. It takes approximately 2 weeks for the symptoms to be reduced.

Adipose tissue is found above the platysma muscle, so liposuction of the neck may be performed fairly easily without the need to pierce it. It is also important to not damage the platysma muscle to prevent bleeding.

== Images ==
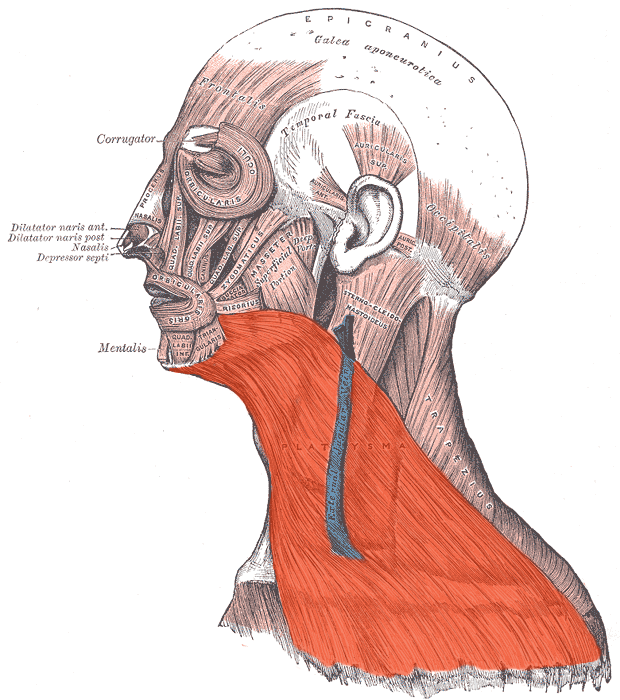
Platysma is visible at bottom, in neck

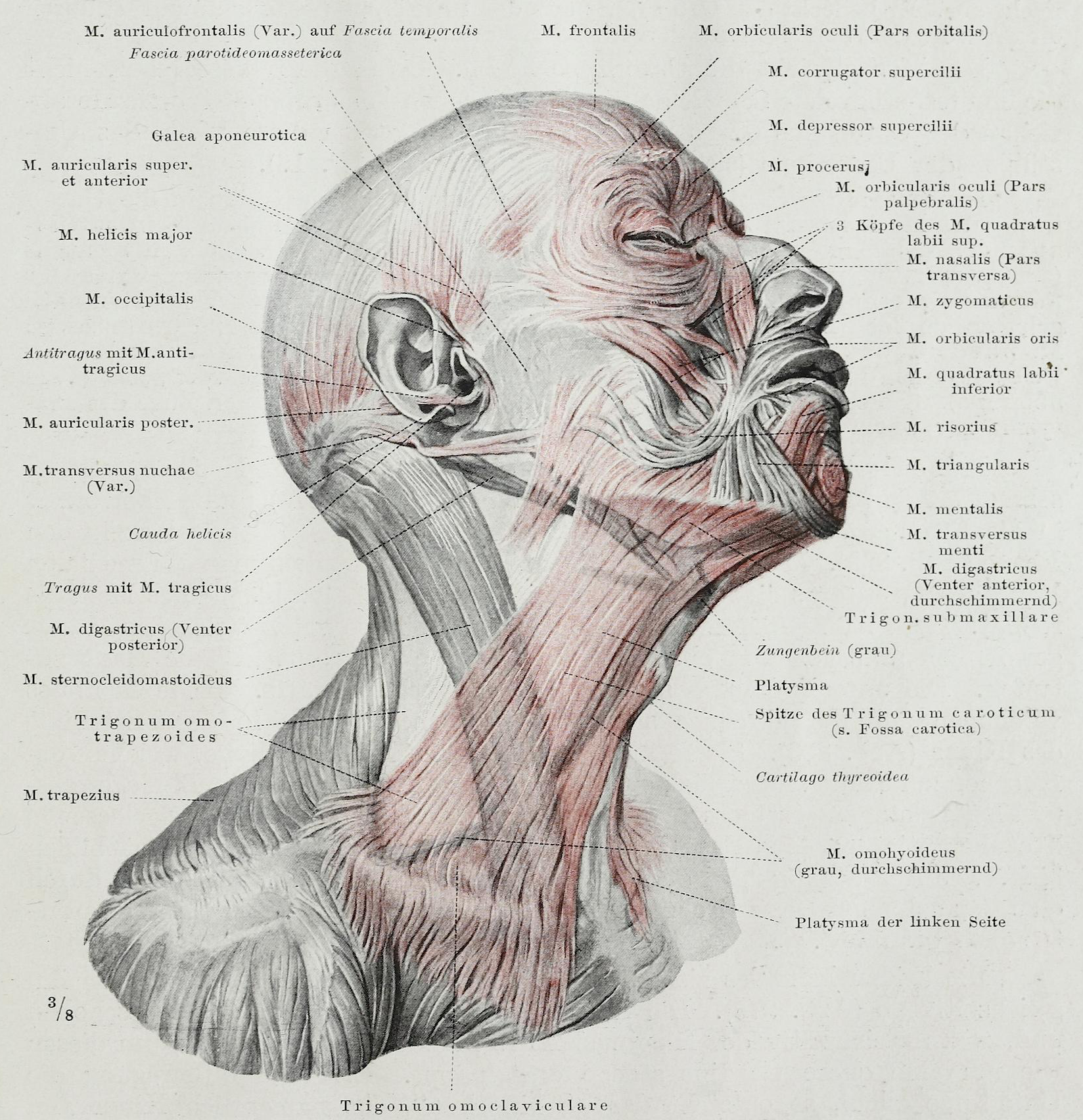
Platysma
