= Transverse facial artery =

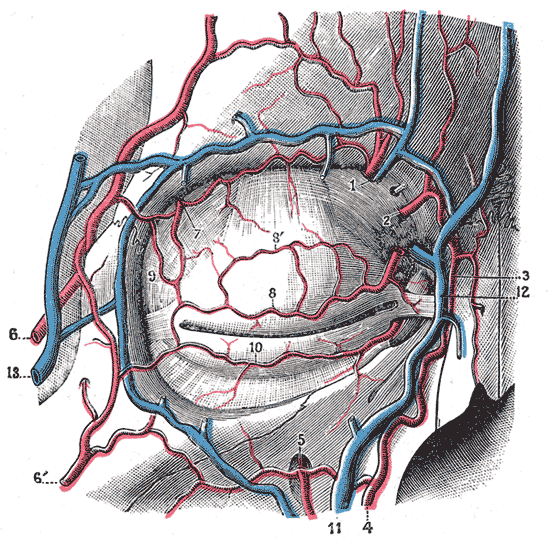
- Bloodvessels of the eyelids, front view. 1, supraorbital artery and supraorbital vein; 2, nasal artery; 3, angular artery, the terminal branch of 4, the facial artery; 5, suborbital artery; 6, anterior branch of the superficial temporal artery; 6’, malar branch of the transverse artery of the face; 7, lacrimal artery; 8, superior palpebral artery with 8’, its external arch; 9, anastomoses of the superior palpebral with the superficial temporal and lacrimal; 10, inferior palpebral artery; 11, facial vein; 12, angular vein; 13, branch of the superficial temporal vein.

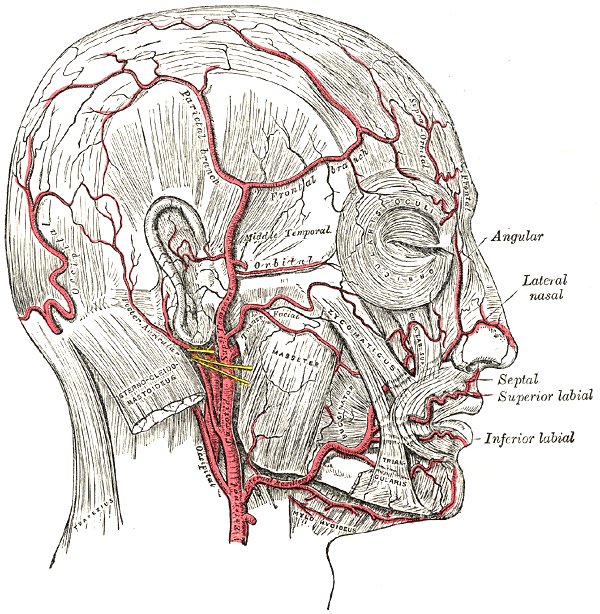
- The arteries of the face and scalp. (Transv. facial labeled at center, to right of ear.)

Details
- Source: Superficial temporal
- Supplies: Parotid gland parotid duct masseter muscle

Identifiers
- Latin: arteria transversa faciei
- TA98: A12.2.05.047
- TA2: 4416
- FMA: 49657

The transverse facial artery is an artery that branches from the superficial temporal artery and runs across the face.

== Course ==
The transverse facial artery is given off from the superficial temporal artery before that vessel leaves the parotid gland; running forward through the substance of the gland, it passes transversely across the side of the face, between the parotid duct and the lower border of the zygomatic arch, and divides into numerous branches, which supply the parotid gland and parotid duct, the masseter muscle, and the integument, and anastomose with the facial artery, the masseteric artery, the buccinator artery, and the infraorbital artery.

This vessel rests on the masseter, and is accompanied by one or two branches of the facial nerve.

== Additional images ==
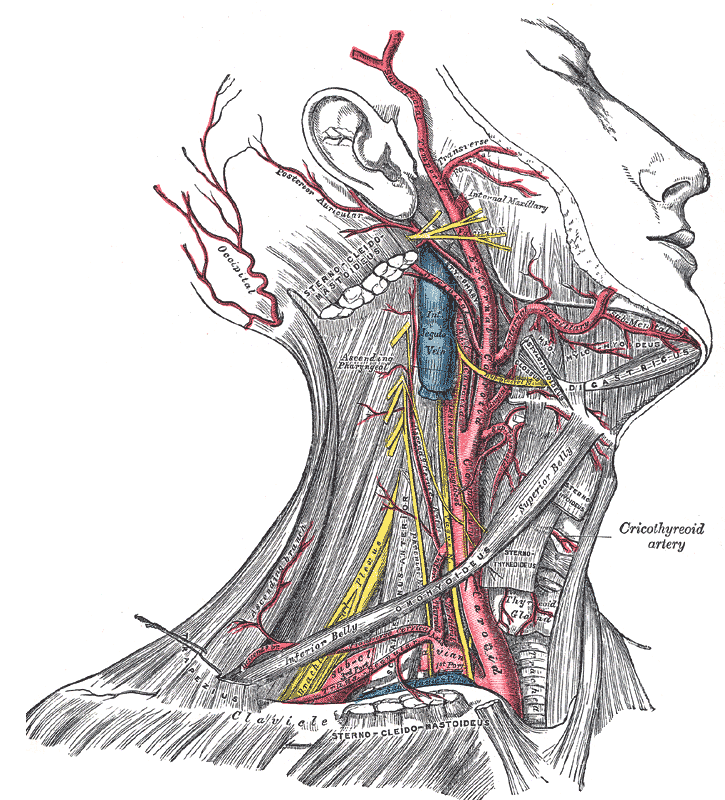
Superficial dissection of the right side of the neck, showing the carotid and subclavian arteries

== See also ==
- Facial artery
