= Antegonial notch =

Indentation on the lower jawbone

Antegonial Notch
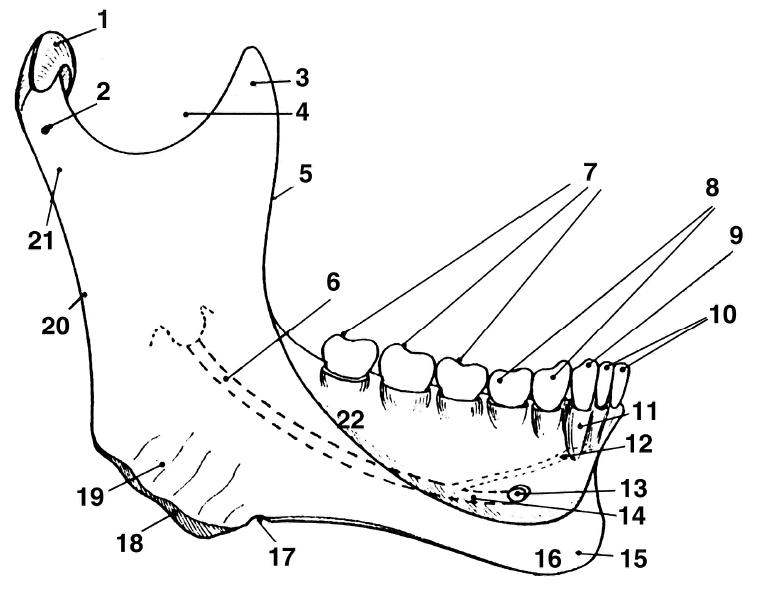
- Lateral view of the mandible with antegonial notch labelled as 17

Details
- Precursor: Mandibular arch (first pharyngeal arch)
- System: Skeletal system
- Artery: Facial artery
- Vein: Facial vein
- Nerve: Marginal mandibular branch of the facial nerve (proximity)
- Lymph: Submandibular lymph nodes (proximity)

The antegonial notch is a subtle indentation located on the inferior border of the mandible, immediately anterior to the angle of the mandible. It marks the transition between the inferior border of the mandibular body and the anterior border of the mandibular ramus.

== Anatomy ==
The prominence of the antegonial notch varies considerably among individuals based on factors like age, sex, and ethnicity. It typically presents as a shallow concavity but can occasionally be more pronounced. In adults, the depth of the notch varies with an average of 2.0±1.1 mm. Its clinical importance stems primarily from its close relationship with the facial artery, a major vessel supplying blood to the face.

The facial artery typically crosses the inferior border of the mandible just anterior to the masseter muscle's insertion. In most instances, this crossing occurs at or in close proximity to the antegonial notch. This anatomical association has clinical relevance in various surgical procedures involving the face and mandible. The facial artery's pulse can be palpated against the mandible at this location.

Certain craniofacial syndromes, such as hemifacial microsomia, can result in asymmetry or underdevelopment of the mandible, which may affect the appearance and prominence of the antegonial notch on the affected side. Its morphology can also be affected by fractures, tumors and other pathological processes.

== Clinical Significance ==
- Surgery: Surgeons performing procedures such as rhytidectomy (facelift surgery), orthognathic surgery (corrective jaw surgery), or managing mandibular trauma must be aware of the facial artery's position relative to the antegonial notch to prevent inadvertent injury.
- Radiology: The antegonial notch serves as a useful anatomical landmark when interpreting radiographs (X-rays) and computed tomography (CT) scans of the mandible.
- Forensic Science: In certain cases, the antegonial notch may be employed as a reference point in forensic facial reconstruction.
- The depth of antegonial notch is an indicator of mandibular growth potential.
