= Medial palpebral arteries =

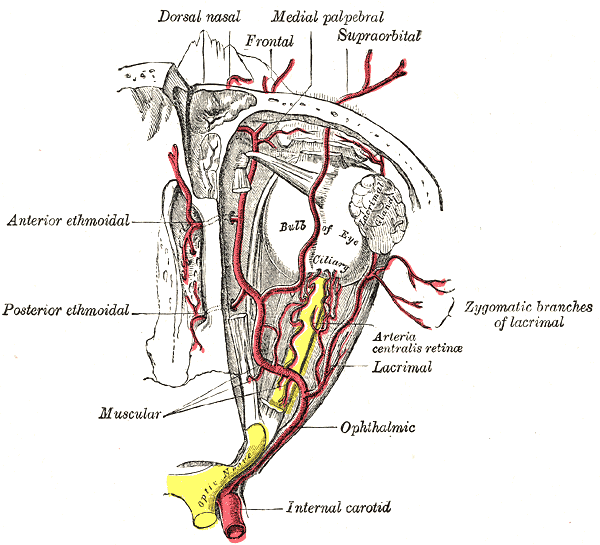
- The ophthalmic artery and its branches. (Medial palpebral labeled at center top.)

Details
- Source: Ophthalmic artery
- Branches: Superior palpebral arch inferior palpebral arch
- Supplies: Eyelids

Identifiers
- Latin: arteriae palpebrales mediales
- TA98: A12.2.06.044
- TA2: 4496
- FMA: 70785

The medial palpebral arteries (internal palpebral arteries) are arteries of the head that contribute arterial blood supply to the eyelids. They are derived from the ophthalmic artery; a single medial palpebral artery issues from the ophthalmic artery before splitting into a superior and an inferior medial palpebral artery, each supplying one eyelid.

== Anatomy ==
=== Origin ===
A single medial palpebral artery issues from the ophthalmic artery before bifurcating into a superior and an inferior medial palpebral artery.

The origin occurs near the trochlea of the superior oblique muscle.

=== Course ===
The medial palpebral arteries leave the orbit to encircle the eyelids near their free margins, forming a superior and an inferior arch, which lie between the orbicularis oculi and the tarsi.

=== Anastomoses ===
The superior medial palpebral artery anastomoses (at lateral angle of the orbit) with the upper lateral palpebral artery, and the zygomaticoorbital branch of the temporal artery.

The inferior medial palpebral artery anastomoses at the lateral angle of the orbit with the lower lateral palpebral artery, and with the transverse facial artery, and at the medial part of the lid with a branch from the angular artery (from this last anastomoses a branch passes to the nasolacrimal duct, ramifying in its mucous membrane as far as the inferior meatus of the nasal cavity).

== Additional images ==
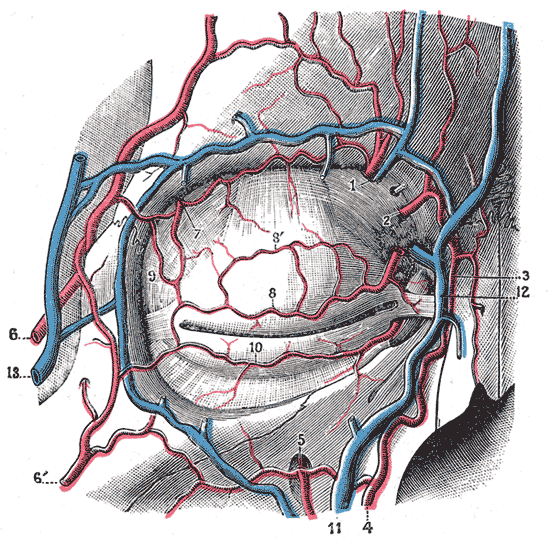
Bloodvessels of the eyelids, front view.
