= Angular artery =

Artery of the face

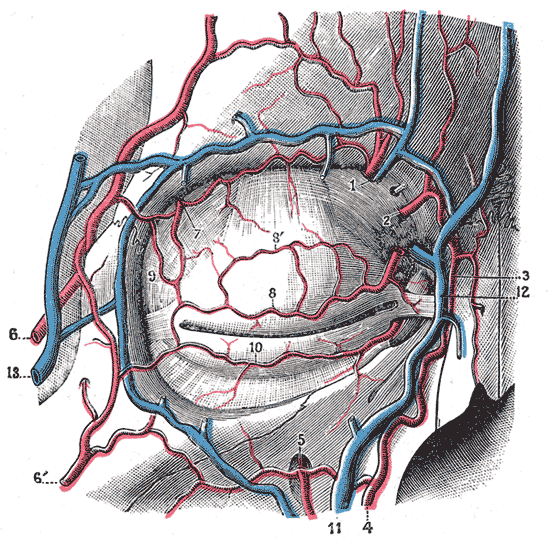
- Blood vessels of the eyelids, front view. 1, supraorbital artery and supraorbital vein; 2, nasal artery; 3, angular artery, the terminal branch of 4, the facial artery; 5, suborbital artery; 6, anterior branch of the superficial temporal artery; 6’, malar branch of the transverse artery of the face; 7, lacrimal artery; 8, superior palpebral artery with 8’, its external arch; 9, anastomoses of the superior palpebral with the superficial temporal and lacrimal; 10, inferior palpebral artery; 11, facial vein; 12, angular vein; 13, branch of the superficial temporal vein.

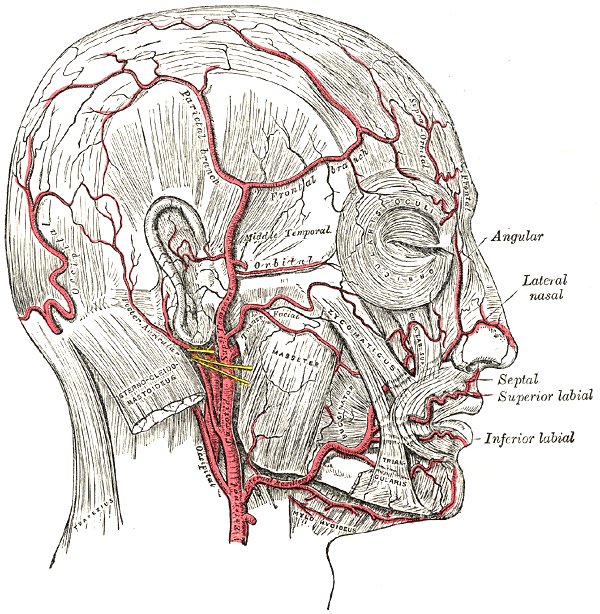
- The arteries of the face and scalp (angular artery labeled at center right)

Details
- Source: Facial artery
- Vein: Angular vein
- Supplies: Lacrimal sac, orbicularis oculi muscle

Identifiers
- Latin: arteria angularis
- TA98: A12.2.05.029
- TA2: 4397
- FMA: 49583

The angular artery is an artery of the face. It is the terminal part of the facial artery. It ascends to the medial angle of the eye's orbit. It is accompanied by the angular vein. It ends by anastomosing with the dorsal nasal branch of the ophthalmic artery. It supplies the lacrimal sac, the orbicularis oculi muscle, and the outer side of the nose.

== Structure ==
The angular artery is the terminal part of the facial artery. It ascends to the medial angle of the eye's orbit (the medial canthus). It is embedded in the fibers of the angular head of the levator labii superioris muscle. It is accompanied by the angular vein. On the cheek, it distributes branches which anastomose with the infraorbital artery. It ends by anastomosing with the dorsal nasal branch of the ophthalmic artery.

== Function ==
The angular artery supplies the lacrimal sac, most of the outer side of the nose, part of the lower eyelid, and the orbicularis oculi muscle.

== Clinical significance ==
The angular artery is important in a nasolabial skin flap for reconstructive surgery. It can be put at risk during acupuncture of skin around the inner side of the eye.

== Additional images ==
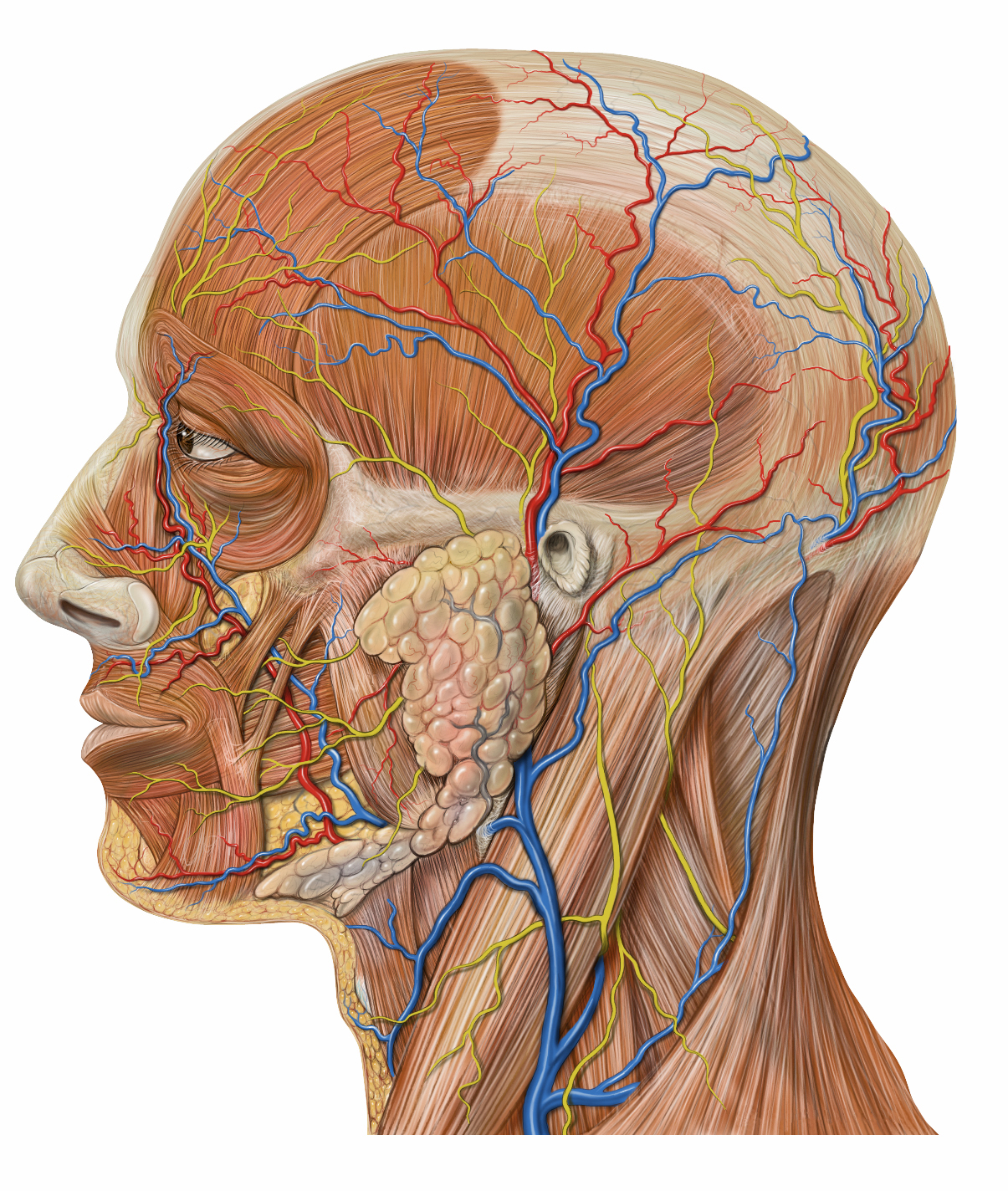
Lateral head anatomy detail

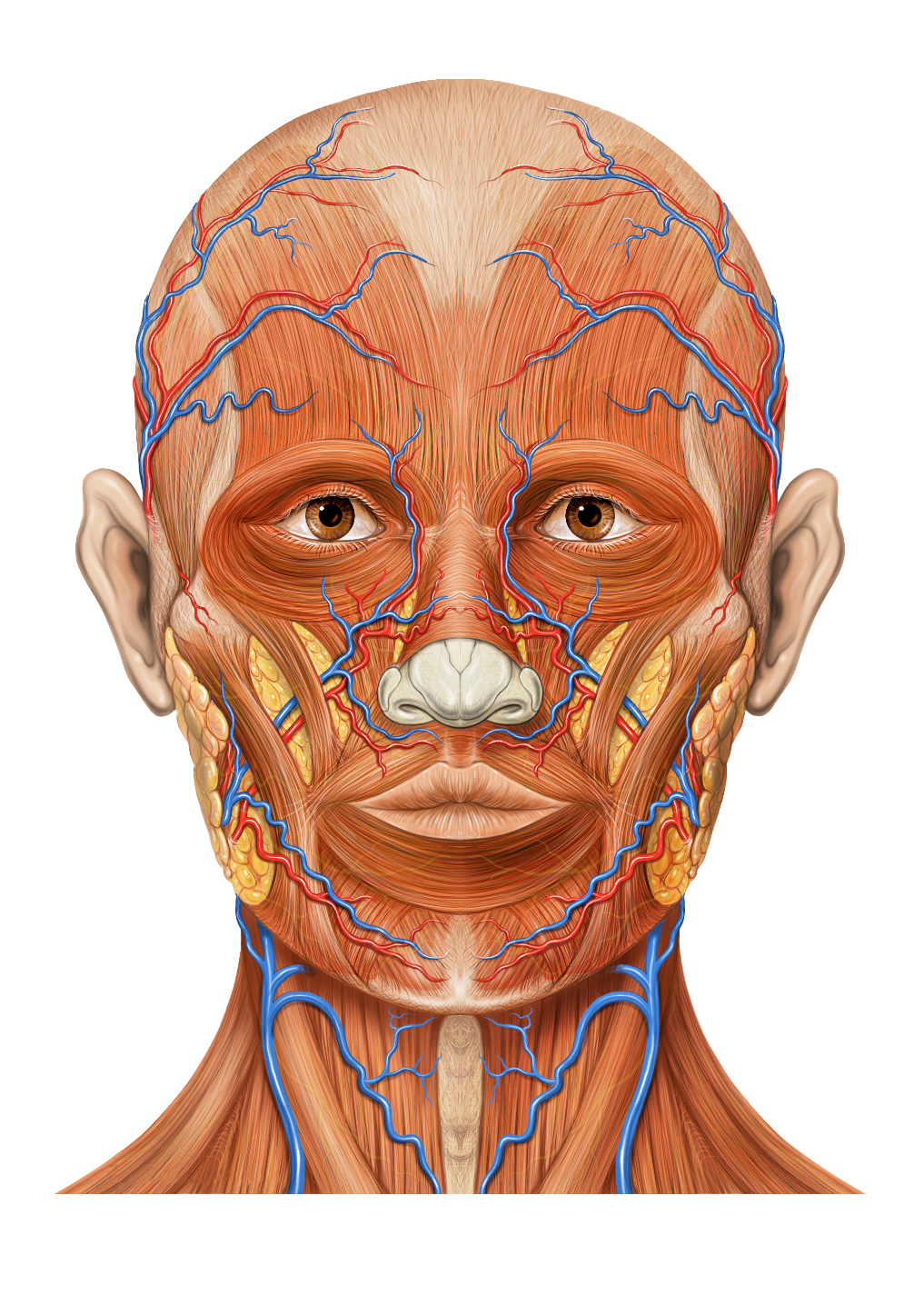
Head anatomy anterior view
