= Superior labial artery =

Artery in the upper lip

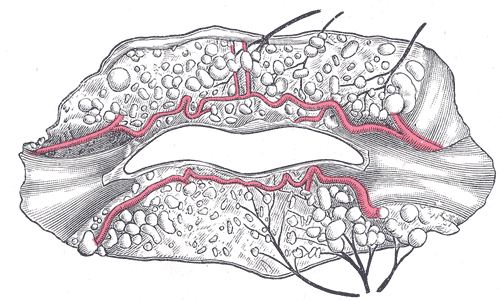
- The labial coronary arteries, the glands of the lips, and the nerves of the right side seen from the posterior surface after removal of the mucous membrane.

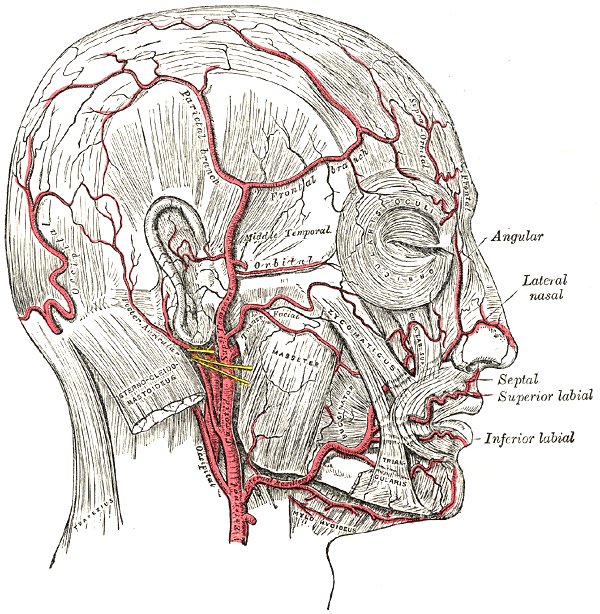
- The arteries of the face and scalp. (Superior labial labeled at bottom right.)

Details
- Source: Facial artery
- Vein: Superior labial vein
- Supplies: Upper lip, nasal septum, ala of the nose

Identifiers
- Latin: ramus labialis superior arteriae facialis, arteria labialis superior
- TA98: A12.2.05.026
- TA2: 4394
- FMA: 49570

The superior labial artery (superior labial branch of facial artery) is larger and more egregious than the inferior labial artery.

It follows a similar course along the edge of the upper lip, lying between the mucous membrane and the orbicularis oris, and anastomoses with the artery of the opposite side.

It supplies the upper lip, and gives off in its course two or three vessels which ascend to the nose; a septal branch ramifies on the nasal septum as far as the point of the nose, and an alar branch supplies the ala of the nose.

== See also ==
- Kiesselbach's plexus

== Additional images ==
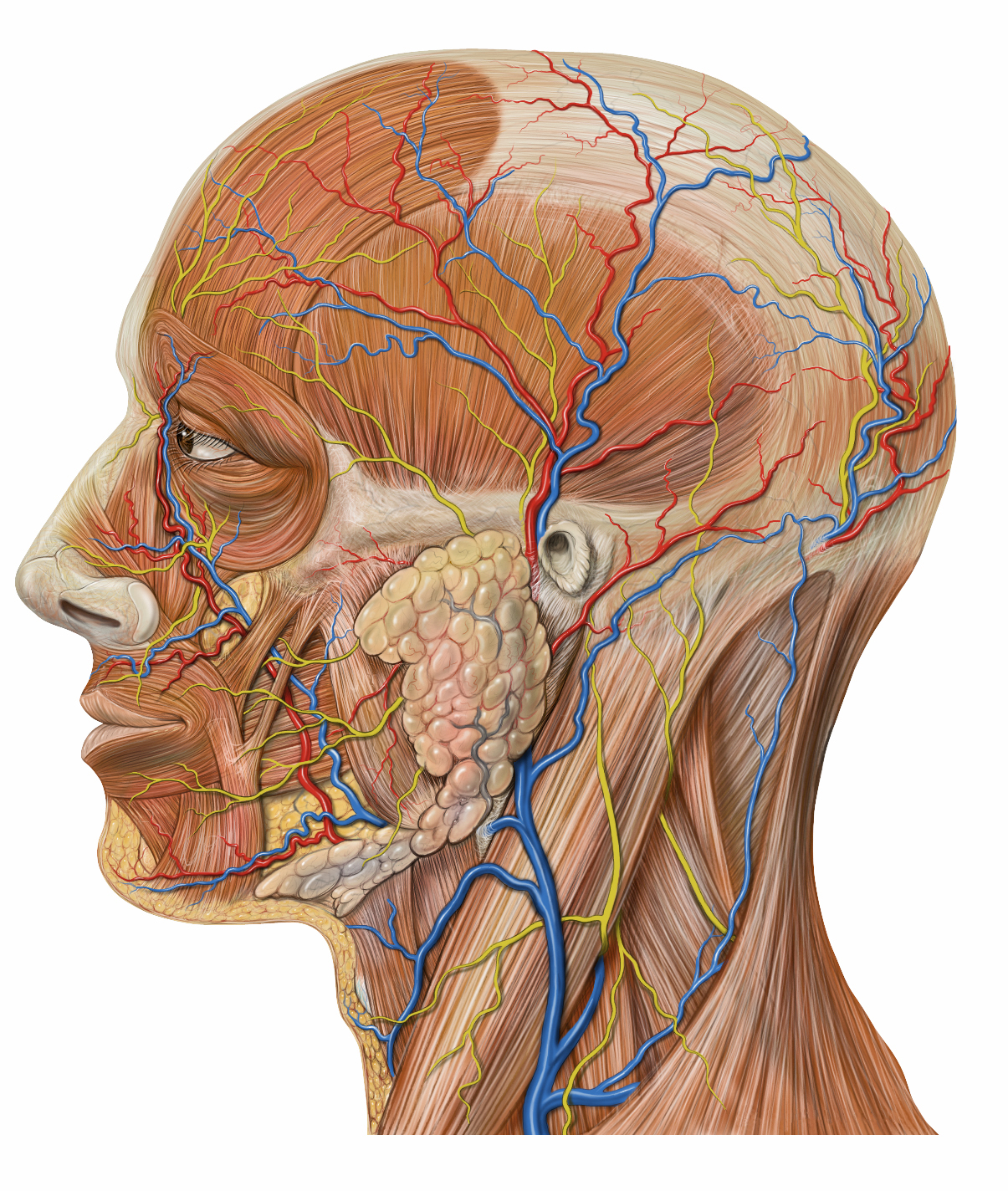
Lateral head anatomy detail

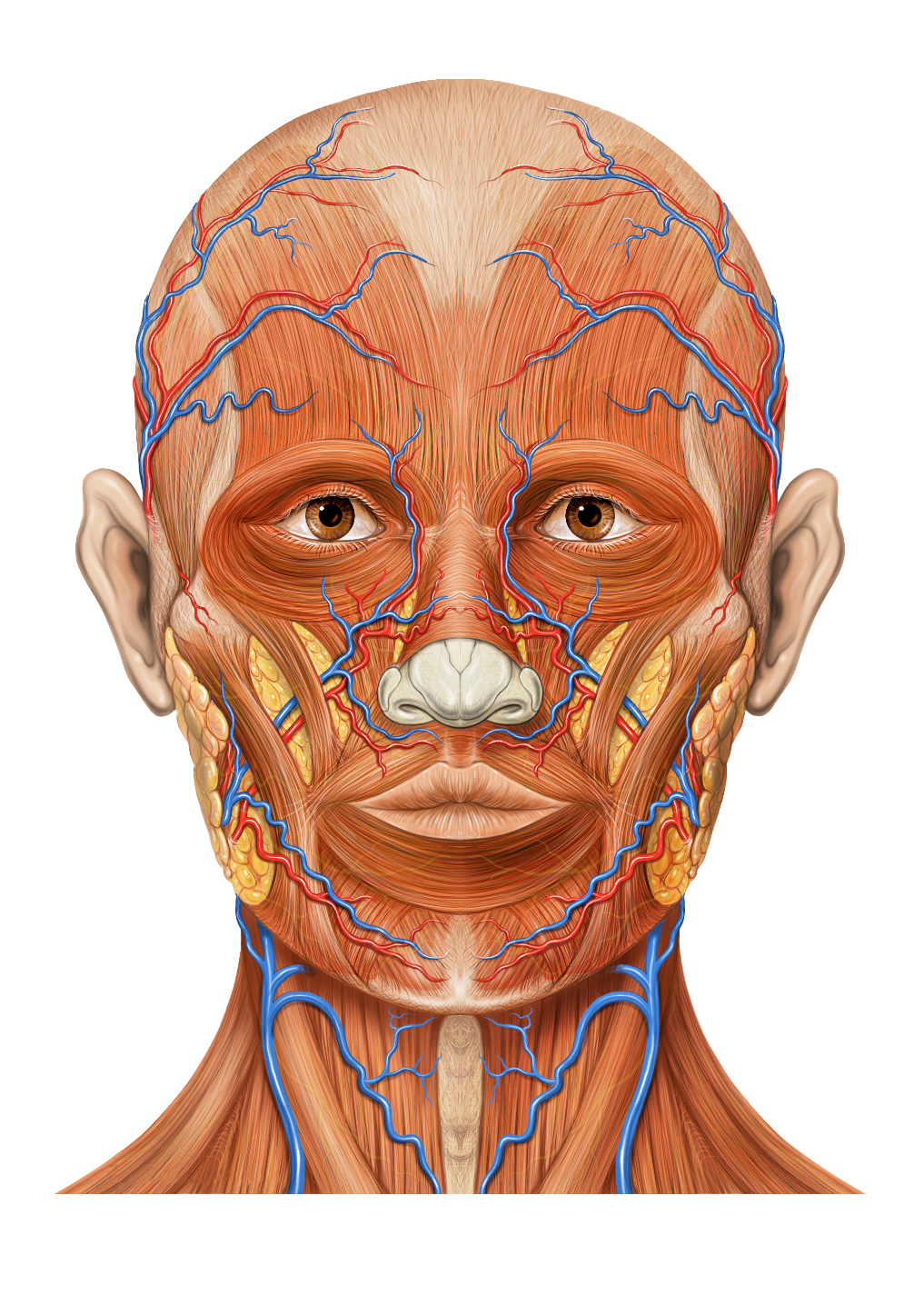
Head anatomy anterior view

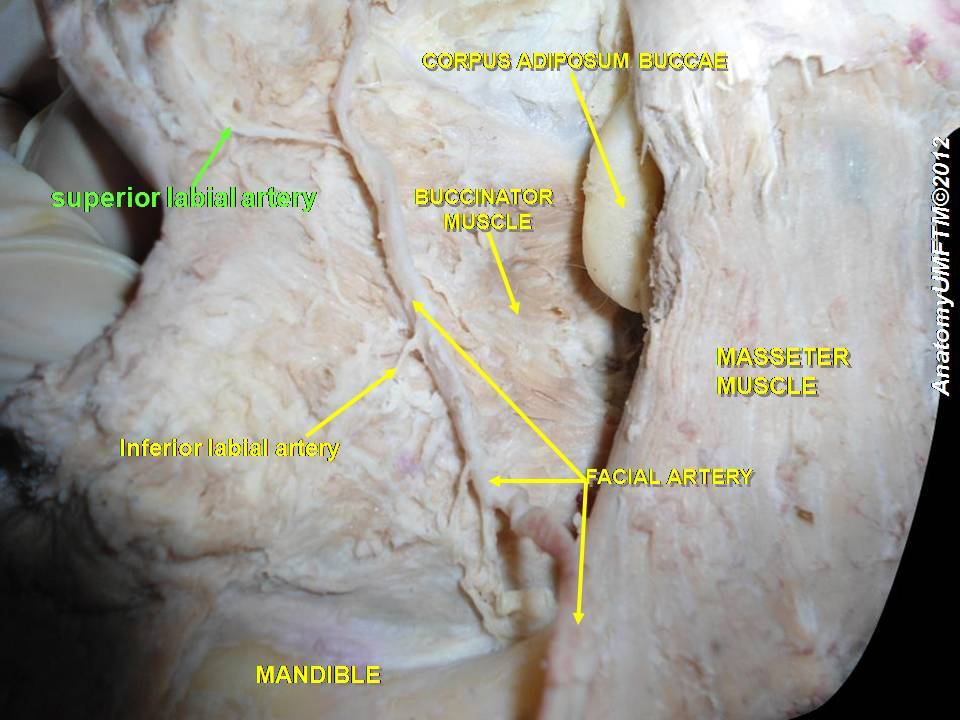
Superior labial artery
