= Buccal artery =

Artery in the human face

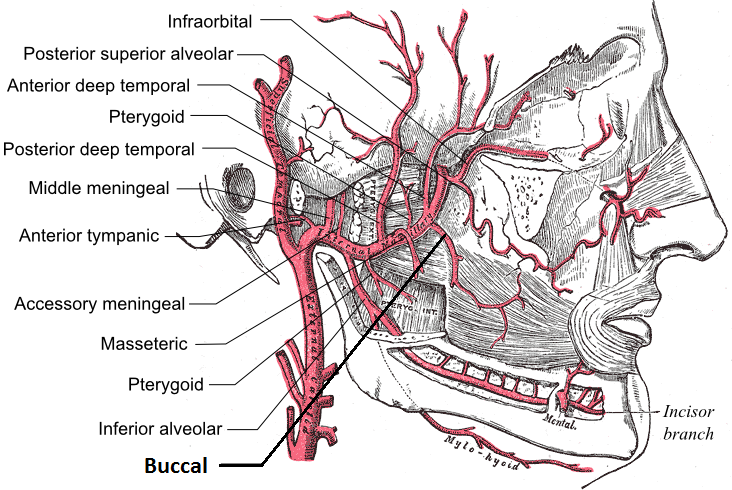
- Branches of the maxillary artery

- Plan of branches of maxillary artery

Details
- Source: Maxillary artery (2nd part)
- Branches: 7th and 8th posterior intercostal arteries
- Supplies: Cheek and buccinator muscle

Identifiers
- Latin: arteria buccalis, arteria buccinatoria
- TA98: A12.2.05.074
- TA2: 4443
- FMA: 49754

The buccal artery (buccinator artery) is a small artery in the head. It branches off the second part of the maxillary artery and supplies the cheek and buccinator muscle.

== Course ==
It runs obliquely forward, between the pterygoideus internus and the insertion of the temporalis, to the outer surface of the buccinator, to which it is distributed, anastomosing with branches of the facial artery and with the infraorbital. From the infraorbital area, it descends bilaterally in the superficial face along the lateral margin of the nose, then running anti-parallel to the facial artery across the lateral oral region.

== Additional images ==
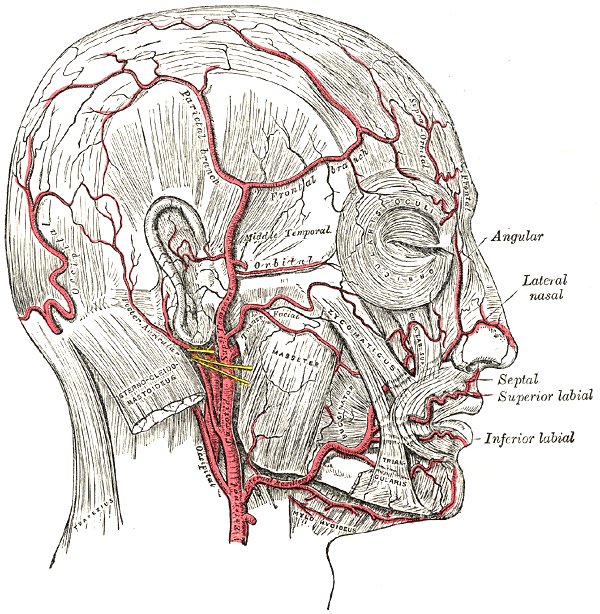
The arteries of the face and scalp.
