= Middle temporal artery =

Artery

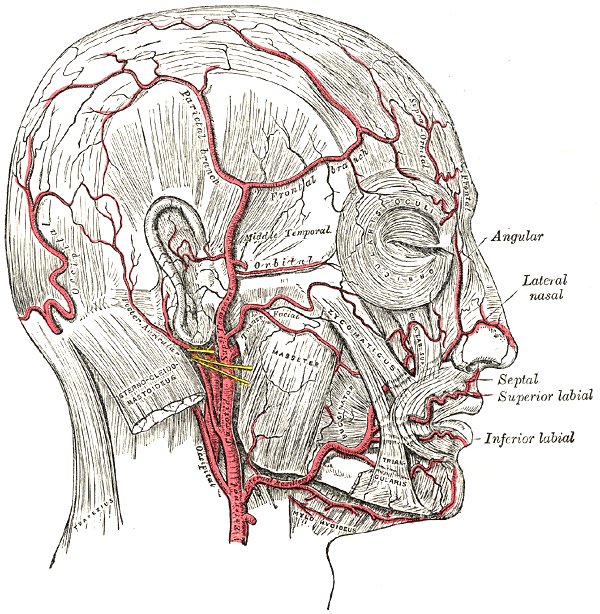
- The arteries of the face and scalp. (Middle temporal visible near center.)

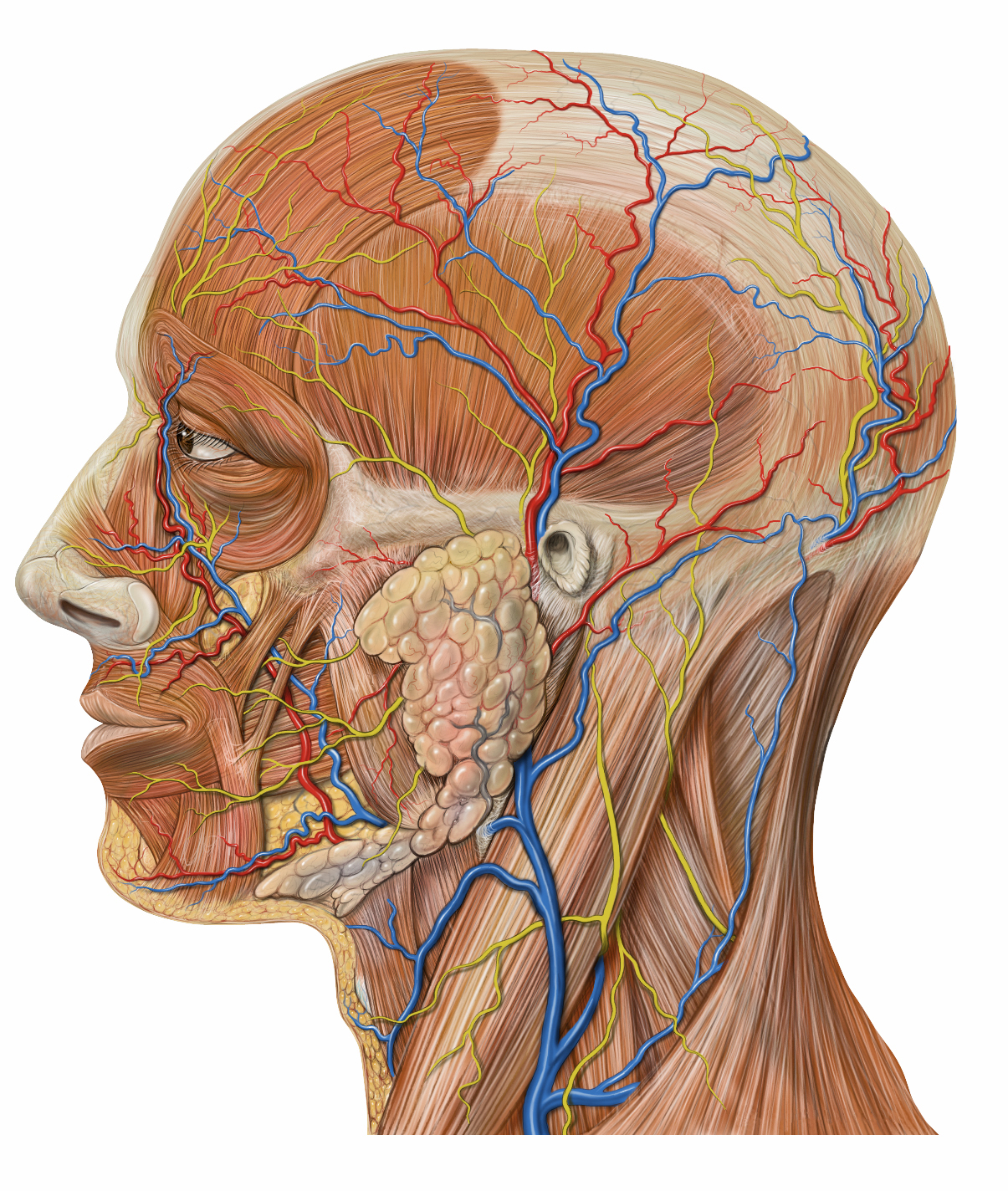
- Lateral head anatomy detail

Details
- Source: Superficial temporal artery

Identifiers
- Latin: arteria temporalis media
- TA98: A12.2.05.050
- TA2: 4419
- FMA: 49666

In anatomy, the middle temporal artery is a major artery which arises immediately above the zygomatic arch, and, perforating the temporal fascia, gives branches to the temporalis, anastomosing with the deep temporal branches of the internal maxillary.

It occasionally gives off a zygomatico-orbital branch, which runs along the upper border of the zygomatic arch, between the two layers of the temporal fascia, to the lateral angle of the orbit (the eye socket).

== Additional images ==
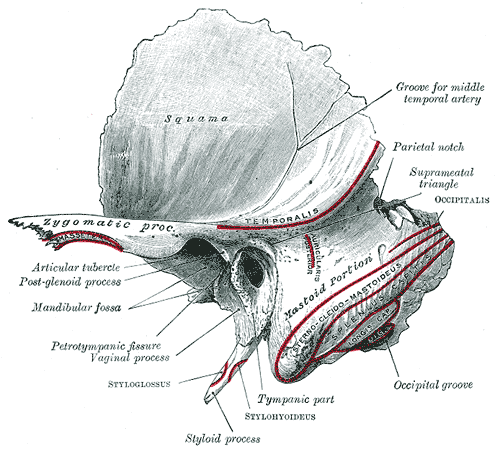
Left temporal bone. Outer surface.
