= Lateral palpebral arteries =

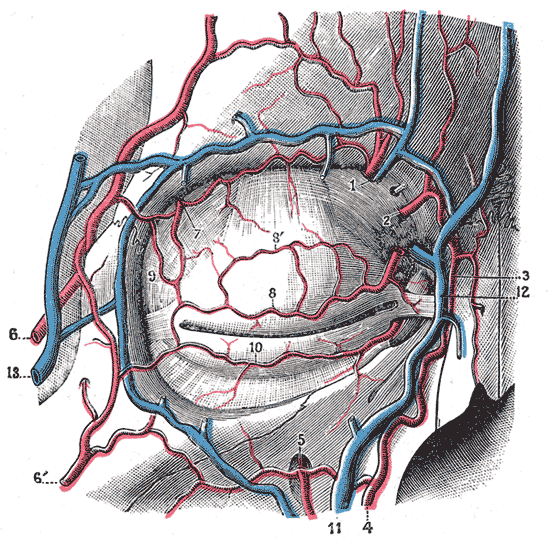
- Bloodvessels of the eyelids, front view. (Lateral palpebral arteries visible but not labeled.)

Details
- Source: Lacrimal artery
- Supplies: Eyelid

Identifiers
- Latin: arteriae palpebrales laterales
- TA98: A12.2.06.029
- TA2: 4478
- FMA: 70781

The lateral palpebral arteries are the two large branches of those terminal branches of the lacrimal gland that supply the eyelid, with one lateral palpebral artery supplying one eyelid or the other. They pass medial-ward within the eyelid. They anastomose with medial palpebral arteries to form an arterial circle.

== See also ==
- Medial palpebral arteries
