= Facial artery =

Artery to portions of the superficial face

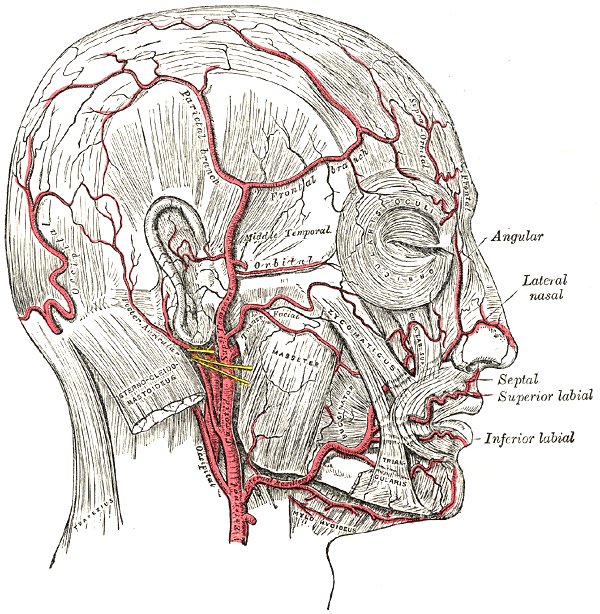
- The arteries of the face and scalp. (External maxillary visible at bottom center.)

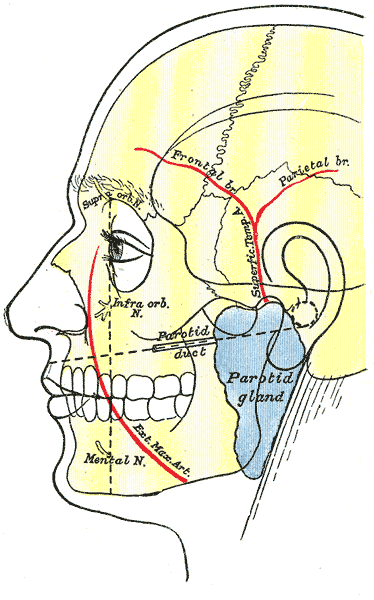
- Outline of side of face, showing chief surface markings. (Label for "Ext. Max. Art." at bottom left.)

Details
- Source: External carotid artery
- Branches: Ascending palatine artery tonsillar branch submental artery glandular branches inferior labial artery superior labial artery lateral nasal branch angular artery (terminal branch)
- Vein: Anterior facial vein, posterior facial vein

Identifiers
- Latin: arteria facialis, arteria maxillaris externa
- TA98: A12.2.05.020
- TA2: 4388
- FMA: 49549

The facial artery, formerly called the external maxillary artery, is a branch of the external carotid artery that supplies blood to superficial structures of the medial regions of the face.

== Structure ==
The facial artery arises in the carotid triangle from the external carotid artery, a little above the lingual artery, and sheltered by the ramus of the mandible. It passes obliquely up beneath the digastric and stylohyoid muscles, over which it arches to enter a groove on the posterior surface of the submandibular gland.

It then curves upward over the body of the mandible at the antero-inferior angle of the masseter (the antegonial notch); passes forward and upward across the cheek to the angle of the mouth, then ascends along the side of the nose, and ends at the medial commissure of the eye, under the name of the angular artery.

The facial artery is remarkably tortuous. This is to accommodate itself to neck movements such as those of the pharynx in swallowing; and facial movements such as those of the mandible, lips, and cheeks.

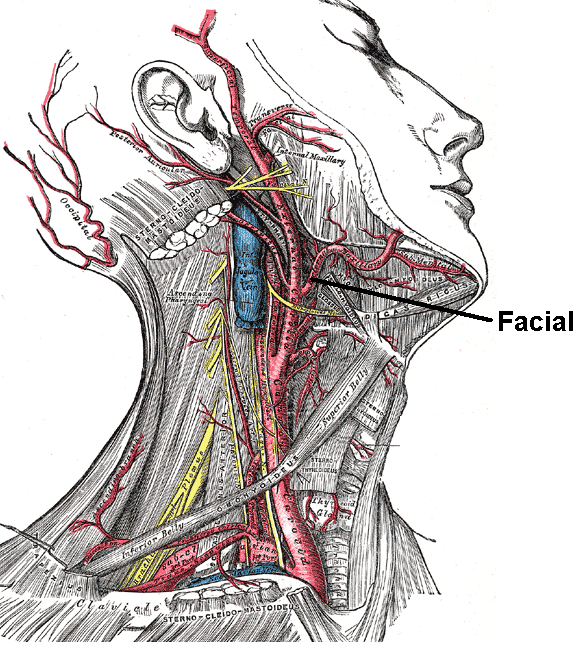
Superficial dissection of the right side of the neck, showing the carotid and subclavian artery. Branch of facial artery labeled

== Relations ==
In the neck, its origin is superficial, being covered by the integument, platysma, and fascia; it then passes beneath the digastric and stylohyoid muscles and part of the submandibular gland, but superficial to the hypoglossal nerve.

It lies upon the middle pharyngeal constrictor and the superior pharyngeal constrictor, the latter of which separates it, at the summit of its arch, from the lower and back part of the tonsil.

On the face, where it passes over the body of the mandible, it is comparatively superficial, lying immediately beneath the dilators of the mouth. In its course over the face, it is covered by the integument, the fat of the cheek, and, near the angle of the mouth, by the platysma, risorius, and zygomaticus major. It rests on the buccinator and levator anguli oris, and passes either over or under the infraorbital head of the levator labii superioris.

The anterior facial vein lies lateral/posterior to the artery, and takes a more direct course across the face, where it is separated from the artery by a considerable interval. In the neck it lies superficial to the artery.

The branches of the facial nerve cross the artery from behind forward.

The facial artery anastomoses with (among others) the dorsal nasal artery of the internal carotid artery.

== Branches ==
The branches of the facial artery are:

- cervical
  - Ascending palatine artery
  - Tonsillar branch
  - Submental artery
  - Glandular branches
- facial
  - Inferior labial artery
  - Superior labial artery
  - Lateral nasal branch to nasalis muscle
  - Angular artery - the terminal branch

== Muscles ==
Muscles supplied by the facial artery include:

- buccinator
- levator anguli oris
- levator labii superioris
- levator labii superioris alaeque nasi
- levator veli palatini
- masseter
- mentalis
- mylohyoid
- nasalis
- palatoglossus
- palatopharyngeus
- platysma
- procerus
- risorius
- styloglossus
- transverse portion of the nasalis

== Clinical significance ==
The facial artery may be punctured during maxillofacial surgery, and is likely to haemorrhage significantly.

== Additional images ==
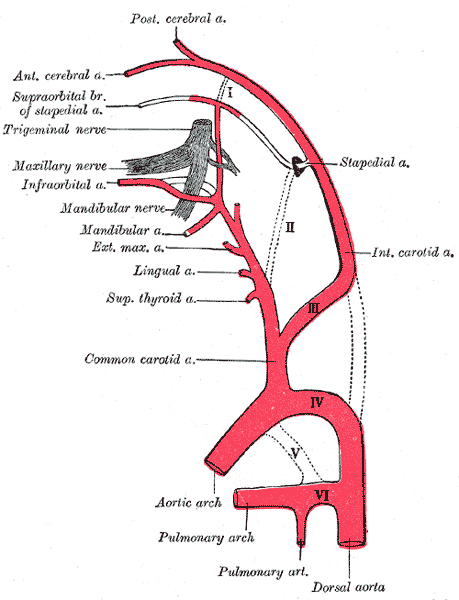
Diagram showing the origins of the main branches of the carotid arteries.

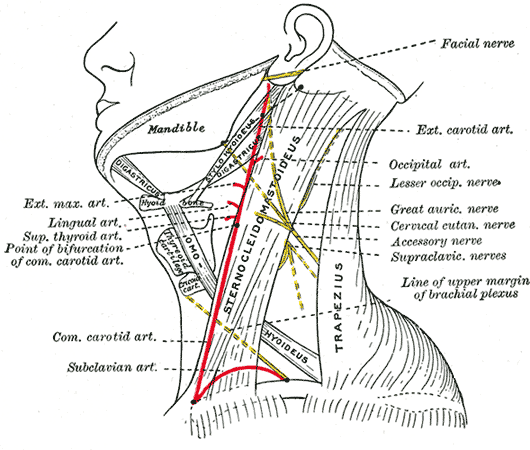
Side of neck, showing chief surface markings.

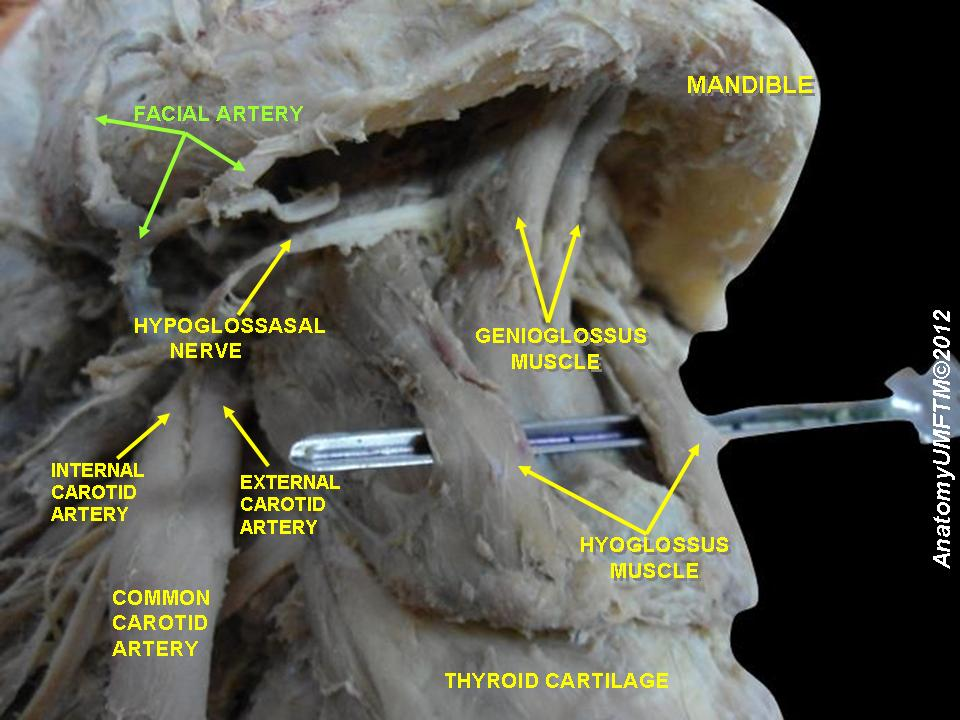
Facial artery

== See also ==
- Transverse facial artery
