= Zygomatico-orbital artery =

Details
- Source: middle temporal

Identifiers
- Latin: arteria zygomaticoorbitalis
- TA98: A12.2.05.049
- TA2: 4418
- FMA: 49663

The middle temporal artery occasionally gives off a zygomatico-orbital branch, which runs along the upper border of the zygomatic arch, between the two layers of the temporal fascia, to the lateral angle of the orbit.

This branch, which may arise directly from the superficial temporal artery, supplies the orbicularis oculi, and anastomoses with the lacrimal and palpebral branches of the ophthalmic artery.
