= Glandular branches of facial artery =

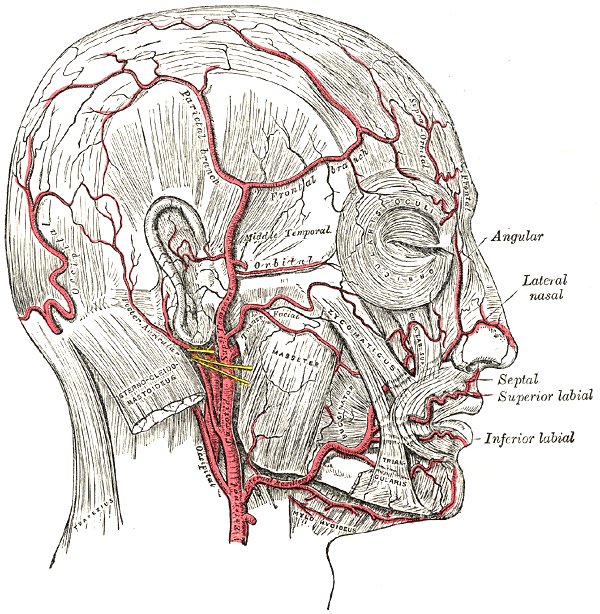
- The arteries of the face and scalp. (Glandular branch visible but not labeled.)

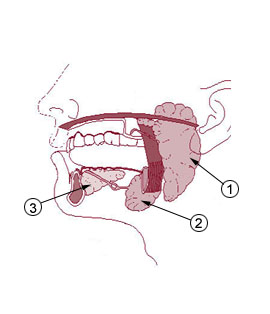
- Salivary glands: #1 is Parotid gland, #2 is Submaxillary gland, #3 is Sublingual gland

Details
- Source: facial artery
- Supplies: submandibular gland

Identifiers
- Latin: rami glandulares arteriae facialis
- TA98: A12.2.05.024
- TA2: 4392
- FMA: 71675

The glandular branches of the facial artery (submaxillary branches) consist of three or four large vessels, which supply the submandibular gland, some being prolonged to the neighboring muscles, lymph glands, and integument.
