= Submental artery =

Branch of the facial artery

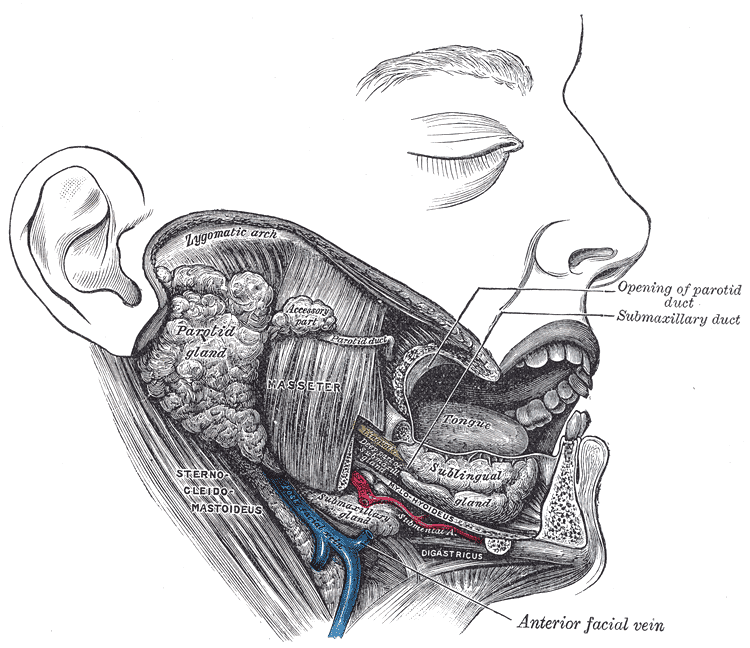
- Dissection, showing salivary glands of right side. (Submental artery visible at bottom right.)

Details
- Source: facial artery
- Branches: superficial branch deep branch

Identifiers
- Latin: arteria submentalis
- TA98: A12.2.05.023
- TA2: 4391
- FMA: 49561

The submental artery is the largest branch of the facial artery in the neck. It first runs forward under the mouth, then turns upward upon reaching the chin.

== Anatomy ==
=== Origin ===
The submental artery is the largest branch of the facial artery in the neck.

It arises from the facial artery just as the facial artery splits the submandibular gland.

=== Course and distribution ===
The artery passes anterior-ward upon the mylohyoid muscle, coursing inferior to the body of the mandible and deep to the digastric muscle. Here, the artery supplies adjacent muscles and skin; it also forms anastomoses with the sublingual artery and with the mylohyoid branch of the inferior alveolar artery. Upon reaching the chin, artery turns superior-ward at the mandibular symphysis to pass over the mandible before dividing into a superficial branch and a deep branch; the two terminal branches are distributed to the chin and lower lip, and form anastomoses with the inferior labial and mental arteries.

=== Branches ===
- The superficial branch passes between the integument and depressor labii inferioris, and anastomoses with the inferior labial artery.
- The deep branch runs between the muscle and the bone, supplies the lip, and anastomoses with the inferior labial artery and the mental branch of the inferior alveolar artery.

== Additional images ==
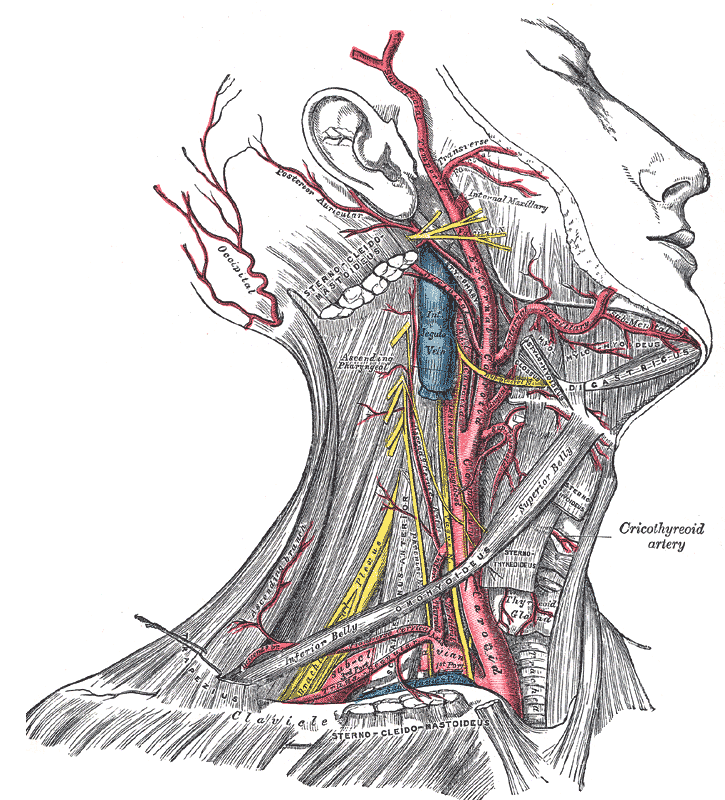
Superficial dissection of the right side of the neck, showing the carotid and subclavian arteries.

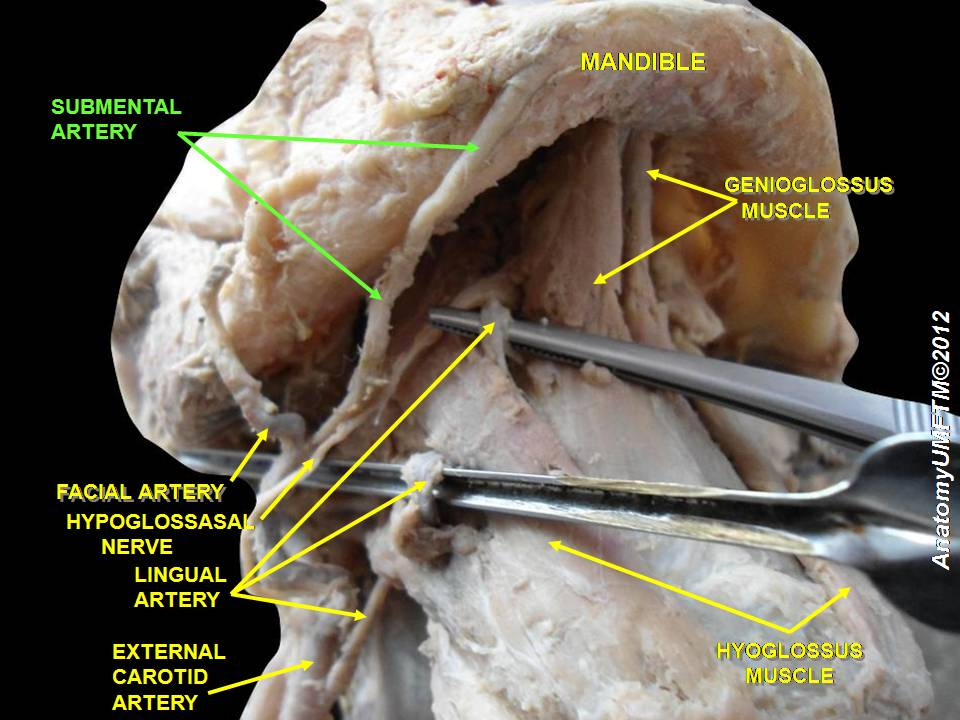
Submental artery

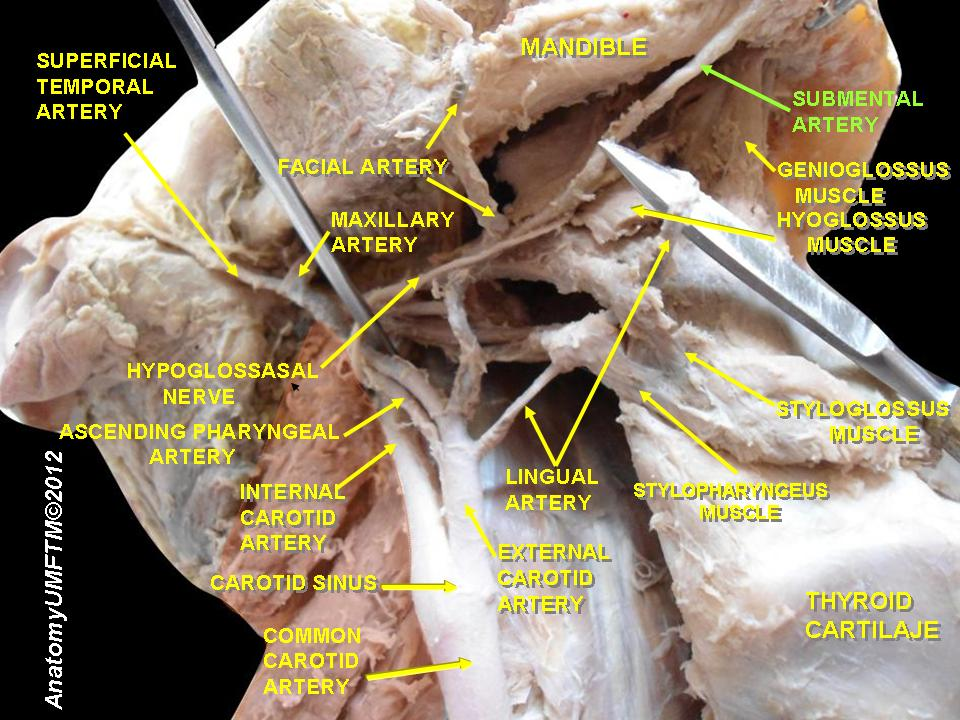
Submental artery
