= Infraorbital artery =

- Plan of branches of internal maxillary artery. (Infraorbital at far right.)

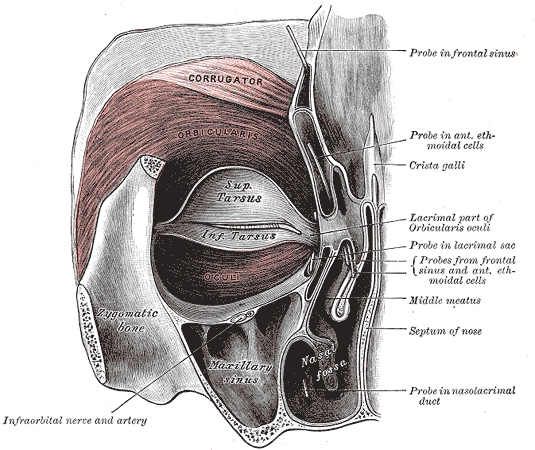
- Left orbicularis oculi, seen from behind. (Infraorbital labeled at lower left.)

Details
- Source: Maxillary artery
- Branches: Orbital branches anterior superior alveolar arteries

Identifiers
- Latin: arteria infraorbitalis
- TA98: A12.2.05.078
- TA2: 4447
- FMA: 49767

The infraorbital artery is a small artery in the head that arises from the maxillary artery and passes through the inferior orbital fissure to enter the orbit, then passes forward along the floor of the orbit, finally exiting the orbit through the infraorbital foramen to reach the face.

== Anatomy ==
=== Origin ===
The infraorbital artery arises from the maxillary artery; it often arises in conjunction with the posterior superior alveolar artery. It may be considered a continuation of the third part of the maxillary artery and continues the direction of the maxillary artery.

=== Course ===
It passes anterior-ward to enter the orbit through the inferior orbital fissure. In the orbit, it courses along the floor of the orbit with the infraorbital nerve first along the infraorbital groove and then the infraorbital canal. It exits the orbit (with the infraorbital nerve) through infraorbital foramen to reach the face, beneath the infraorbital head of the levator labii superioris muscle.

=== Branches ===
While in the canal, it gives off:

- Orbital branches - assist in supplying the inferior rectus and inferior oblique and the lacrimal sac.
- Anterior superior alveolar artery - supplies upper/maxillary canine and incisor teeth.
- Middle superior alveolar artery - upper/maxillary canine and incisor teeth. May be absent.

On the face, some branches pass upward to the medial angle of the orbit and the lacrimal sac, anastomosing with the angular artery, a branch of the facial artery; others run toward the nose, anastomosing with the dorsal nasal branch of the ophthalmic artery; and others descend between the levator labii superioris and the levator anguli oris, and anastomose with the facial artery, transverse facial artery, and buccal artery.

The four remaining branches arise from that portion of the maxillary artery which is contained in the pterygopalatine fossa.

== Additional images ==
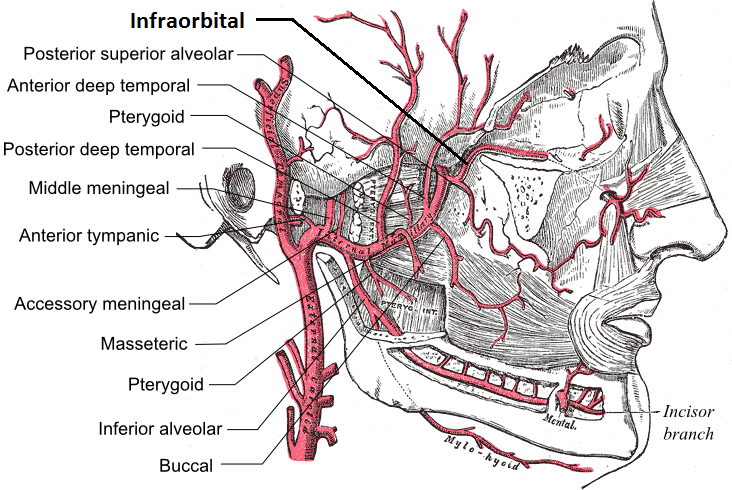
Branches of the maxillary artery.

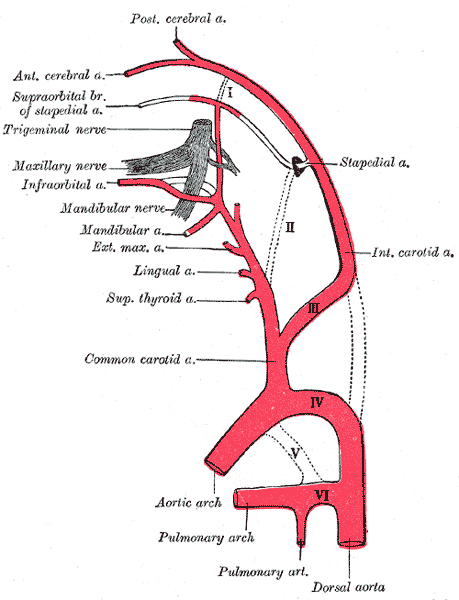
Diagram showing the origins of the main branches of the carotid arteries.

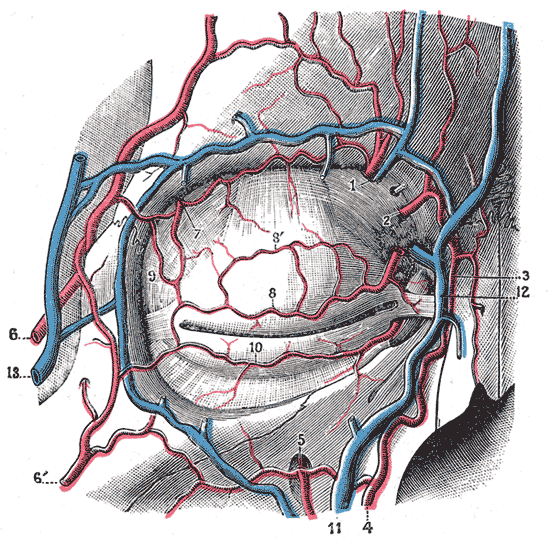
Bloodvessels of the eyelids, front view.
