= Inferior labial artery =

Artery in the lower lip

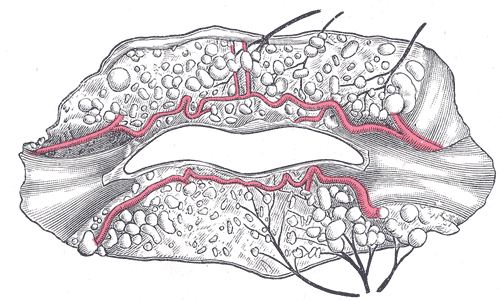
- The labial coronary arteries, the glands of the lips, and the nerves of the right side seen from the posterior surface after removal of the mucous membrane.

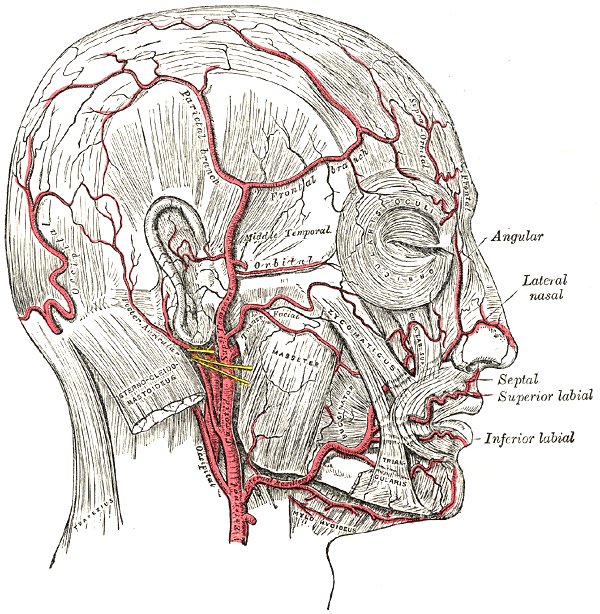
- The arteries of the face and scalp. (Inferior labial labeled at bottom right.)

Details
- Source: Facial artery
- Vein: Inferior labial vein
- Supplies: Lower lip

Identifiers
- Latin: ramus labialis inferior arteriae facialis, arteria labialis inferior
- TA98: A12.2.05.025
- TA2: 4393
- FMA: 49567

The inferior labial artery (inferior labial branch of facial artery) arises near the angle of the mouth as a branch of the facial artery; it passes upward and forward beneath the triangularis and, penetrating the orbicularis oris, runs in a tortuous course along the edge of the lower lip between this muscle and the mucous membrane.

It supplies the labial glands, the mucous membrane, and the muscles of the lower lip; and anastomoses with the artery of the opposite side, and with the mental branch of the inferior alveolar artery.

== Additional images ==
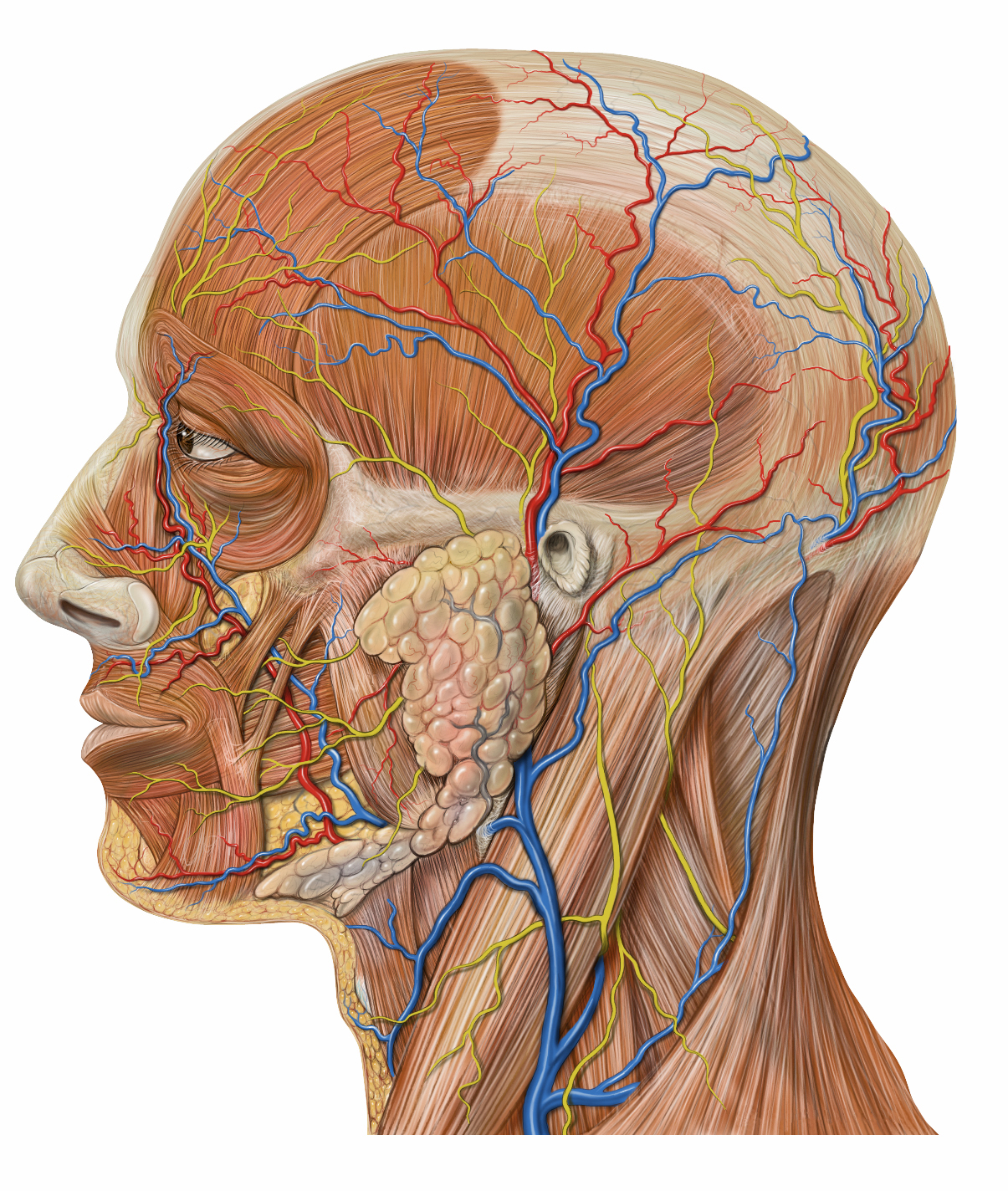
Lateral head anatomy detail

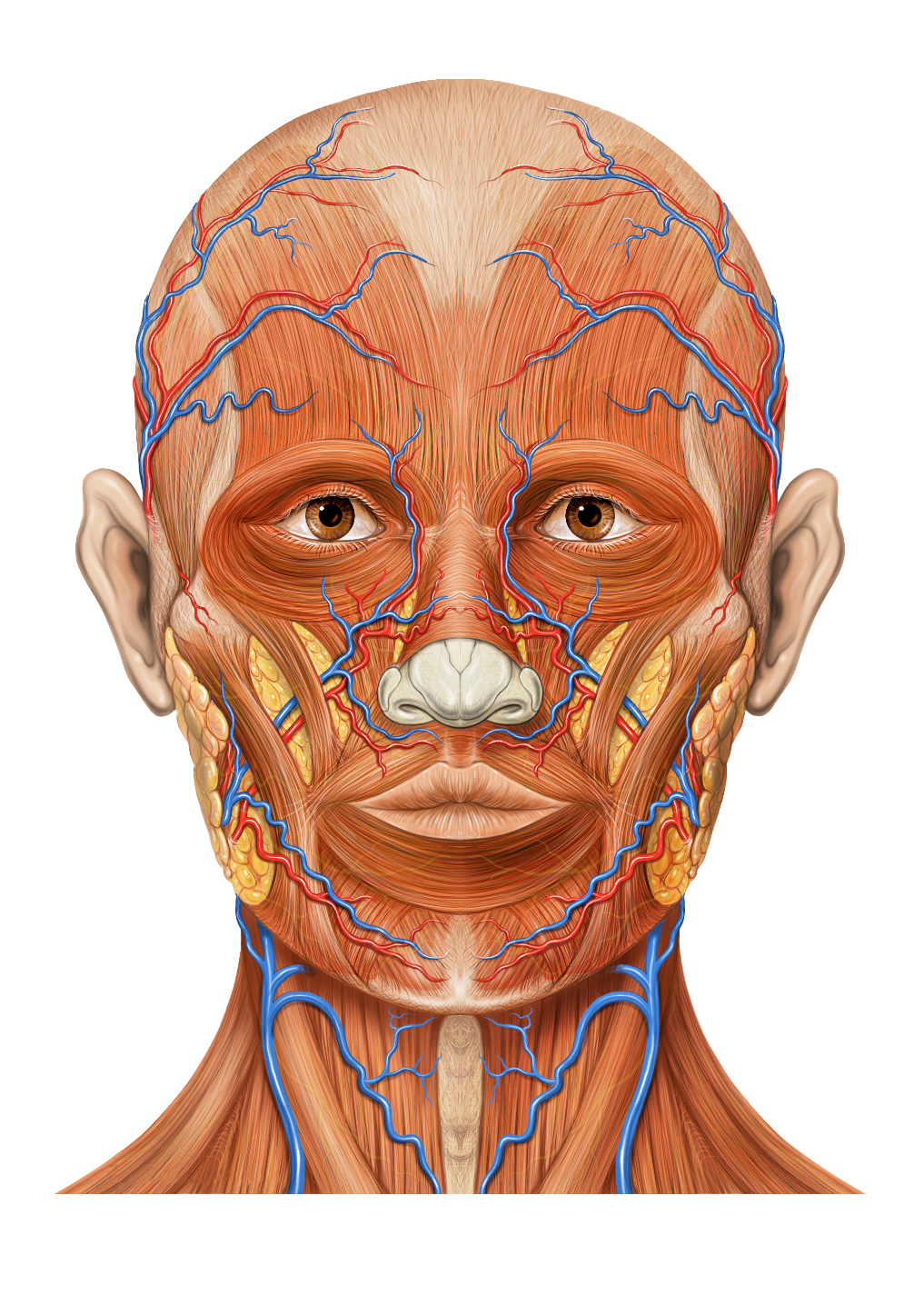
Head anatomy anterior view

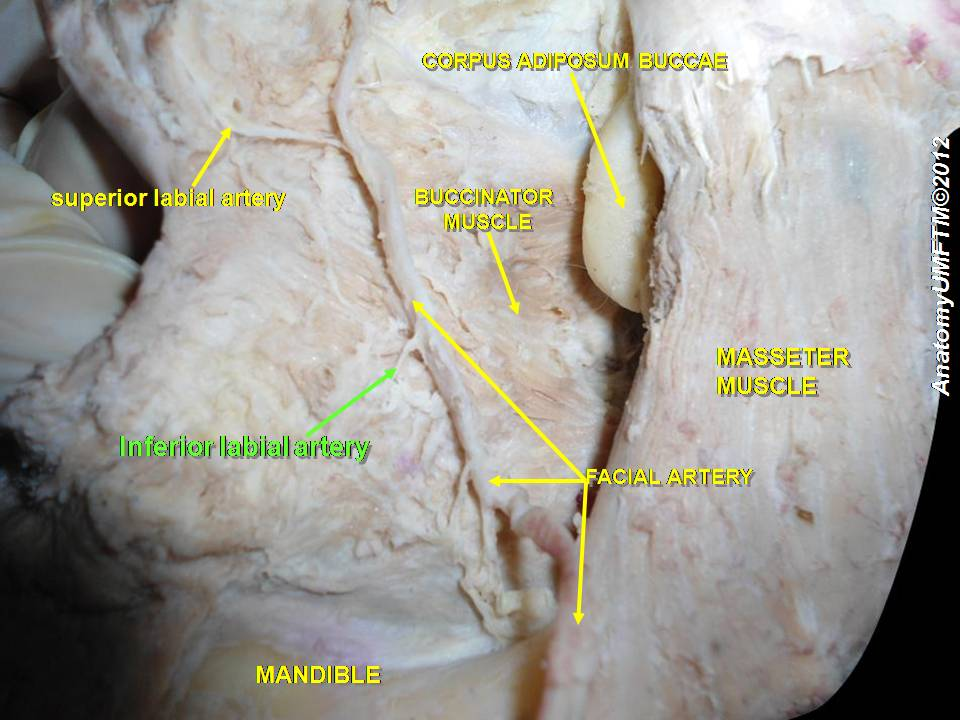
Inferior labial artery
