= Scalp reconstruction =

Scalp reconstruction is a surgical procedure for people with scalp defects. Scalp defects may be partial or full thickness and can be congenital or acquired. Because not all layers of the scalp are elastic and the scalp has a convex shape, the use of primary closure is limited. Sometimes the easiest way of closing the wound may not be the ideal or best way. The choice for a reconstruction depends on multiple factors, such as the defect itself, the patient characteristics and surgeon preference.

== History ==
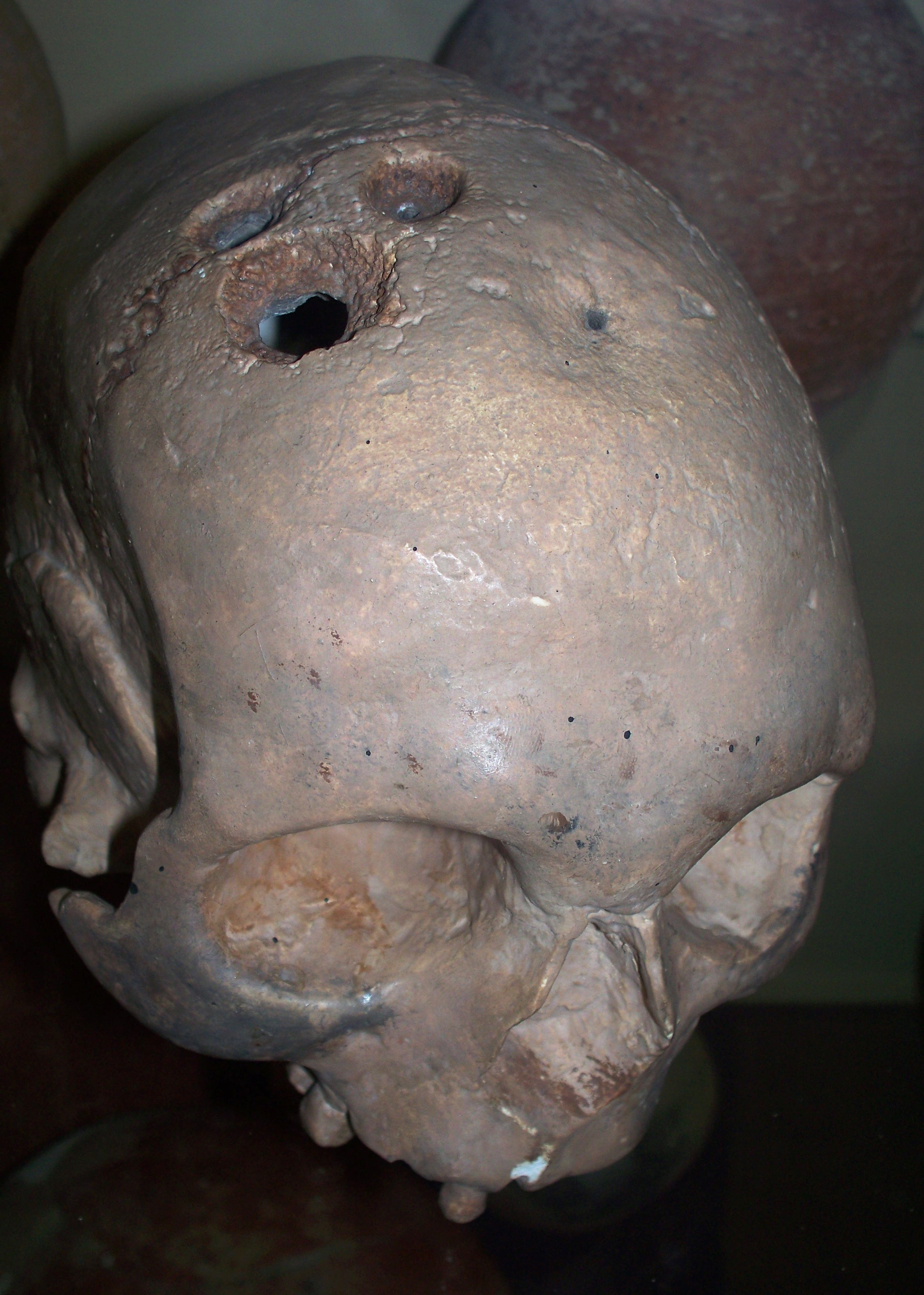
Bronze Age

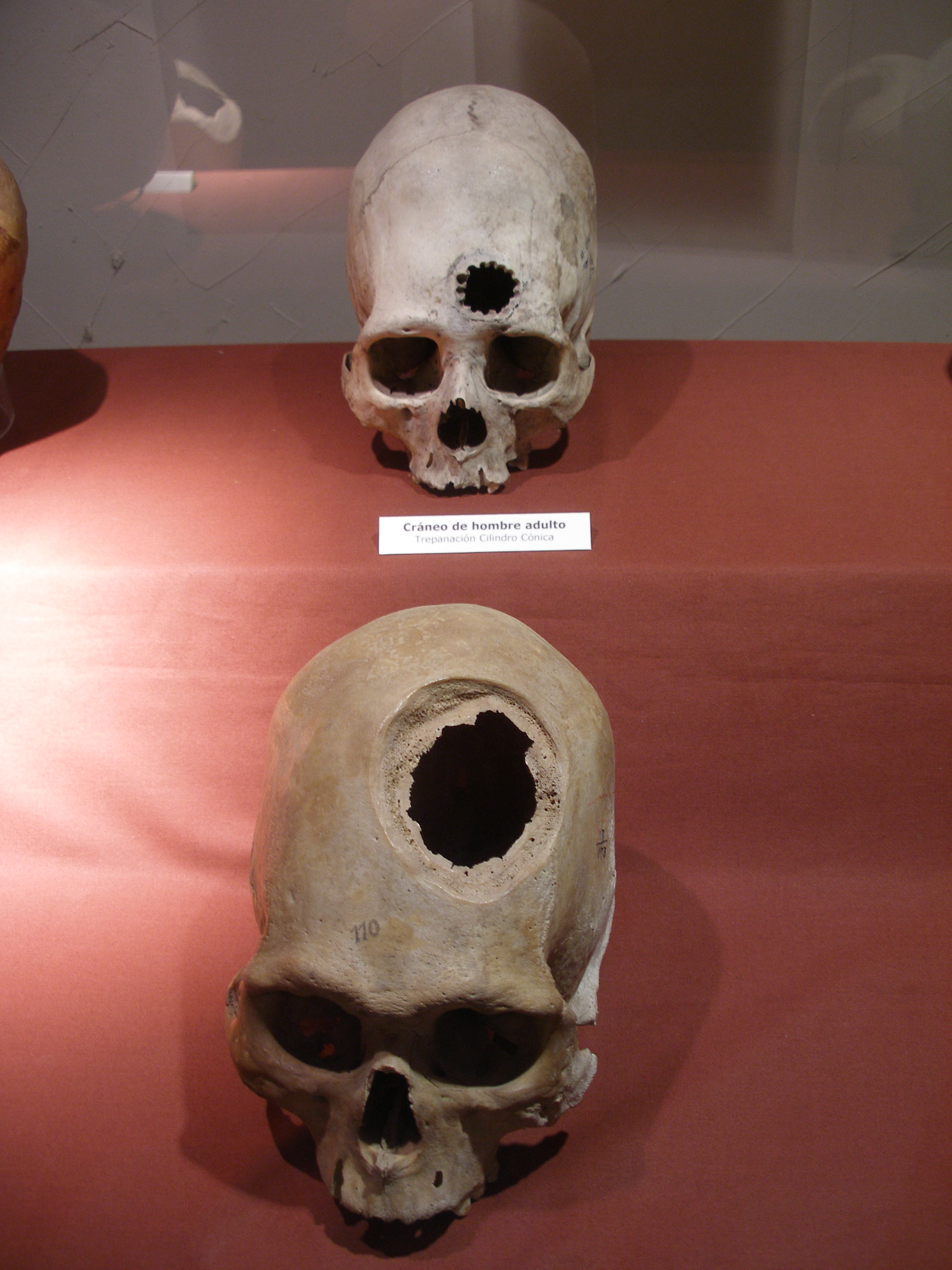
Incan brain surgery

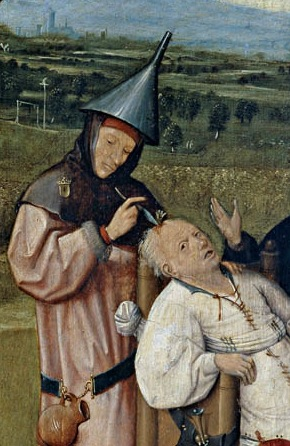
Middle Ages

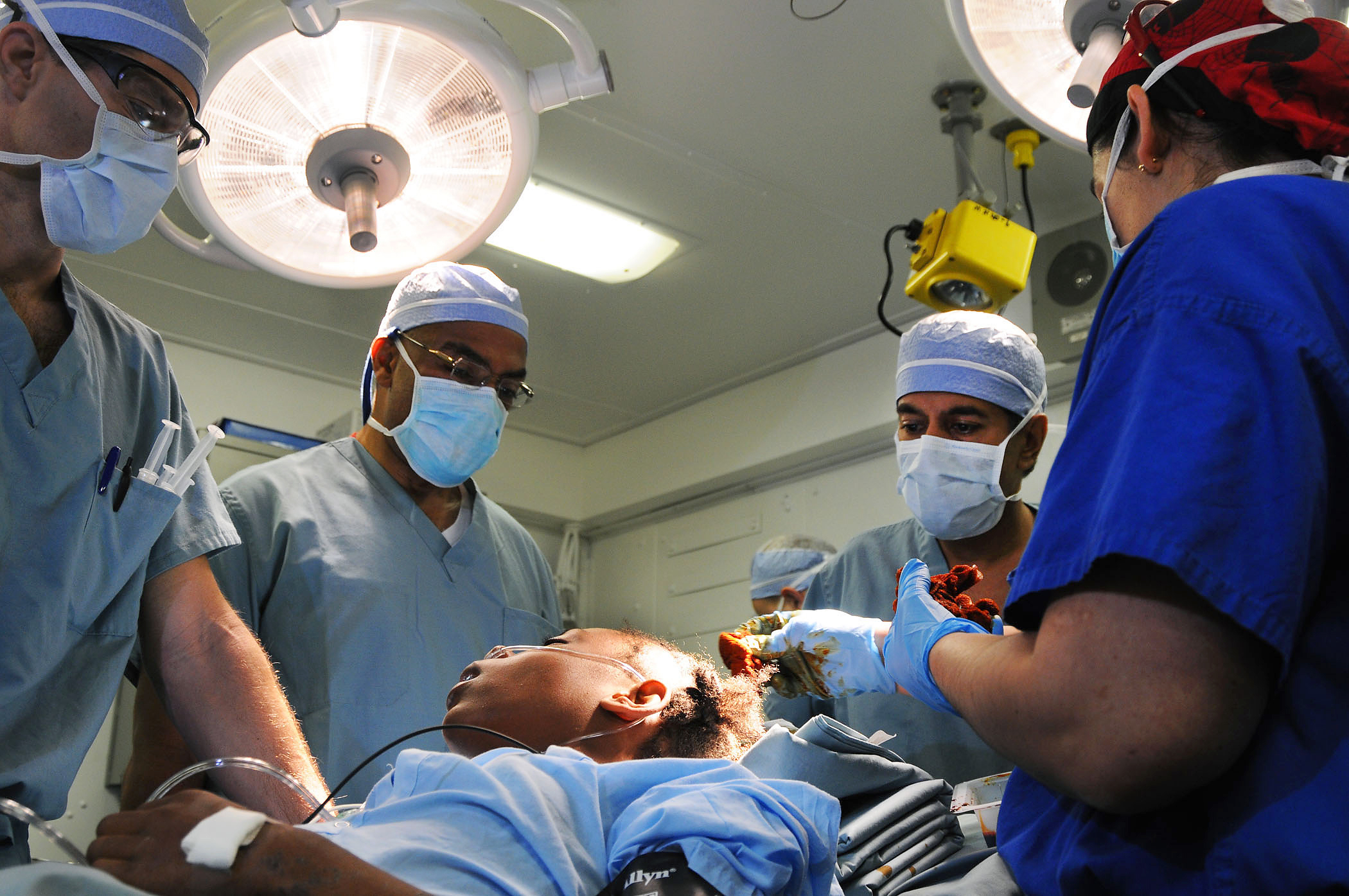
Modern day

Scalp surgery through history

Skull and brain 'surgery' are known from the prehistoric era. There is evidence of scalp reconstructions dating back to the Egyptians in 3000 BC, and to the Roman Empire. The word plastic surgery likely comes from the Greek πλαστικός (plastikós lit. "formable", "mouldable"). Attempts were made to reconstruct damaged skulls despite minimal knowledge of neurology, anatomy, and the brain. Skulls showing manipulation that can be interpreted as a primitive form of surgery have been found from various eras around the world. In medieval times, people were convinced that trepanation was a remedy for various diseases.

== Indications ==
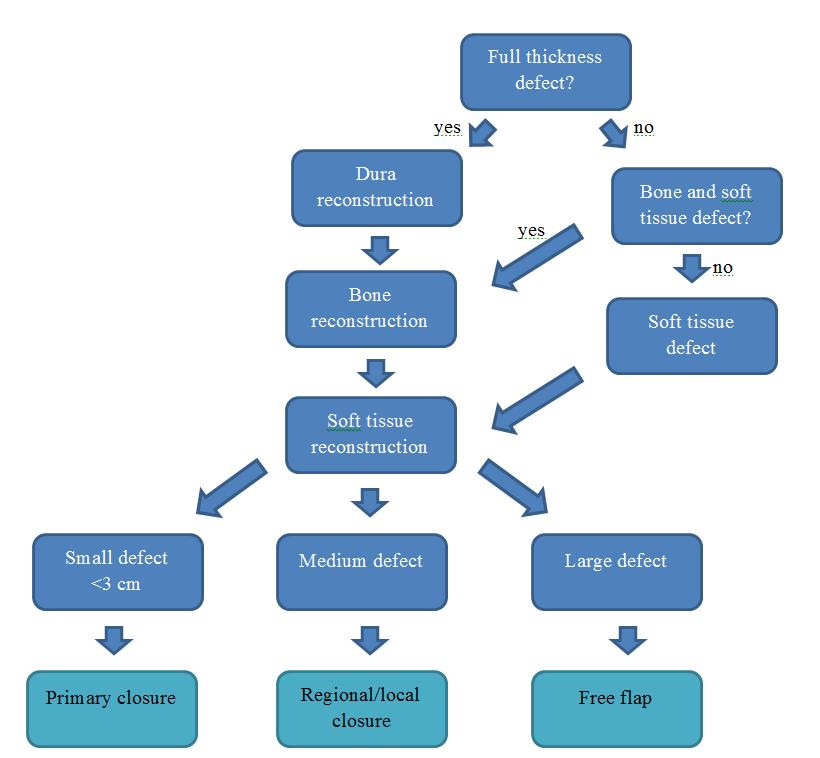
Flowchart for use in scalp reconstruction

Main reasons for scalp reconstruction are divided into two groups: congenital or acquired. Congenital defects may include aplasia cutis congenita, congenital nevus, congenital vascular malformations and congenital tumors. Acquired defects can be caused by burns, blunt, penetrating, or avulsion injuries, tumor invasion, infection, oncologic resection, radiation, or wound-healing difficulties. Alopecia can be an aesthetic motivation for hair-bearing scalp reconstruction. As the incidence of basal-cell carcinoma and squamous-cell carcinoma is rising and about 80% are located in the head and neck area, the number of scalp reconstructions will likely increase in the future. Depending on the size and nature of the defect, an appropriate reconstructive method has to be used. By using Mohs surgery the defect can be kept minimal, but nevertheless infiltrative basal-cell carcinoma may have the need to remove a large part of the scalp.

On the flowchart, a simplified algorithm for scalp reconstruction is depicted. The options range from simple solutions for small skin defects to complicated reconstructions requiring multi-tissue reconstructions.

An active and severe infection must be controlled first by surgical debridement and antibiotic treatment before reconstruction is performed, as infection can cause bacteraemia and has a negative effect on wound healing.

== Surgical anatomy ==
The five layers of the scalp, from superficial to deep, can be memorized by using the mnemonic SCALP. The Skin of the scalp has been scientifically examined for thickness. The posterior scalp skin thickness is 1.48 mm; the temporal scalp is 1.38mm; and the anterior scalp thickness is 1.18 mm. The scalp contains approximately 100.000 hairs. Hair lines make scalp reconstruction difficult because the hair lines must be respected to attain a satisfying aesthetic result. The subCutis is a layer of fat, enclosed in compartments formed by rigid fibrous septa. Their inelasticity prevents bleeding vessels from collapsing and retracting under the skin to achieve haemostasis. All large blood vessels and nerves of the scalp are located in this layer. The next layer is the galea Aponeurotica, which separates the underlying bone and the overlying layers. The large blood vessels and nerves of the scalp do not pierce this layer. Loose connective tissue between the periosteum and the aponeurosis makes these two rigid structures easily slide over each other and contribute to skin movement. Thus, if vascular and nervous anatomy is respected, the skin, subcutaneous tissue and galea aponeurotica can be lifted off the skull with minimal bleeding, nerve damage, or chance of necrosis. This method was first described by Orticochea in 1967, but has been updated to minimize scarring. The fifth layer is the Periosteum of the skull, also referred to as pericranium. It can be separated from the skull, except near the sutures. The skull consists of an inner and outer table, with spongy bone in between known as diploë.

=== Vascular supply ===
On both sides of the scalp, there are five large arteries that perfuse the scalp. Local flaps used for scalp reconstruction must contain at least one of these major arteries, to maintain a reliable blood supply. The scalp can be divided into four different vascular territories:

- Anterior: supratrochlear artery and supraorbital artery
- Lateral: superficial temporal artery
- Posterior: occipital artery
- Posterolateral: posterior auricular artery

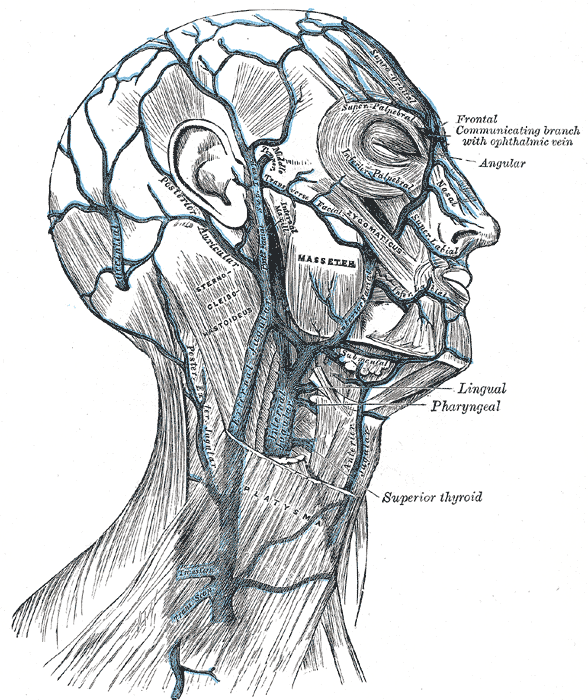
Veins

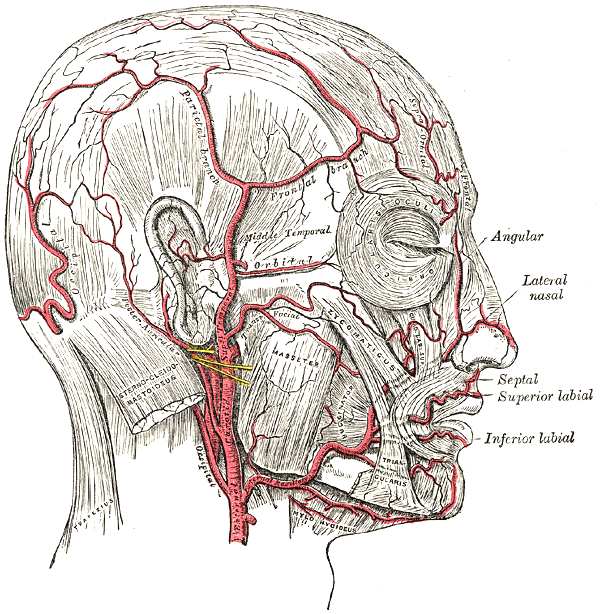
Arteries

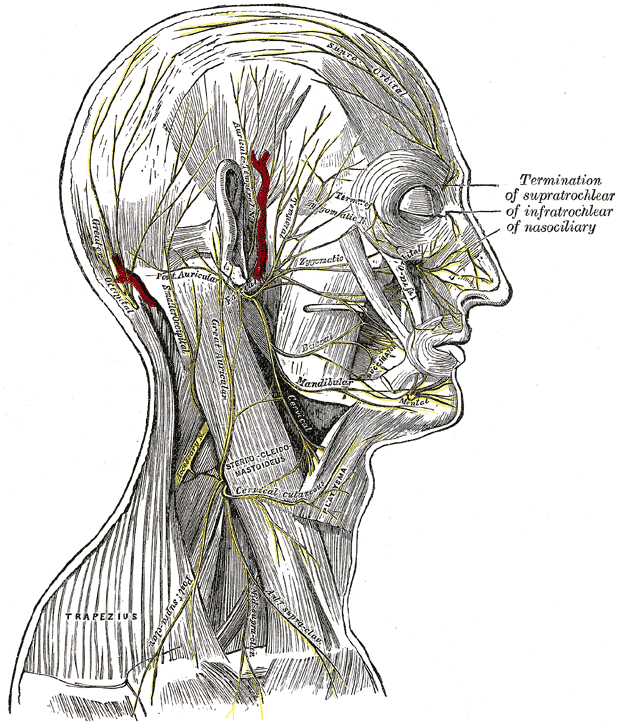
Nerves

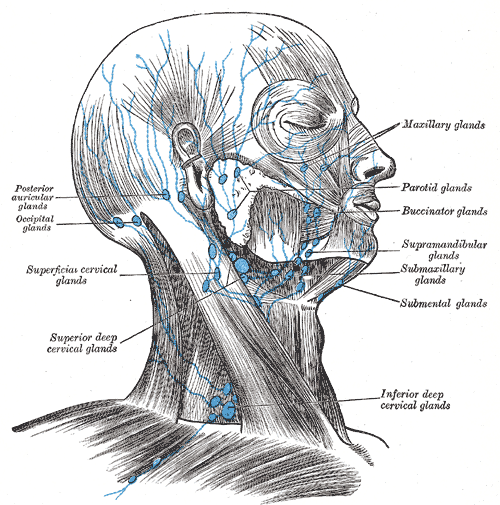
Lymphatic system

Blood vessels, nerves and lymphatic system of the scalp

The veins anastomose frequently with each other and enter the diploic veins of the skull bones and the dural sinuses. This is an extra difficulty as the vein pattern differs. The scalp veins accompany the arteries and have similar names:

- Anterior: Supratrochlear vein and supraorbital vein
- Lateral: Superficial temporal vein
- Posterior: Occipital vein
- Posterolateral: Posterior auricular vein

=== Lymphatic system ===
The frontal part of the scalp is drained to the parotid, submandibular, and deep cervical lymph nodes. The posterior part is drained to the posterior auricular and occipital lymph nodes. Malignancies of the scalp can metastasize to these lymph nodes. Brain tumors, however, tend to metastasize haematogenously (through the blood).

=== Innervation ===
The scalp is innervated by motor nerves and sensory nerves. The trigeminal nerve (CNV) is one of the important cranial sensory nerves which innervates the scalp. From anterior to posterior front to back the nerves are:

- Supratrochlear nerve and Supraorbital nerve
- Zygomaticotemporal nerve
- Auriculotemporal nerve
- Lesser occipital nerve
- Greater occipital nerve

== Non-skin reconstruction ==
=== Dura mater reconstruction ===
Dural lesions should be closed to avoid CSF leakage. Also, a defect acts like a port of entry for micro-organisms that can cause meningitis. If fibrin glue or primary closure is not possible, patches have to be used. These are made from cadaveric dura mater, xenografts (tachosil, duragen, durepair), or synthetic grafts materials (PTFE, neuropatch). However, (vascularised) autografts (fascia lata, muscle or omentum majus) are preferred in irradiated or severely infected defects.

=== Bone defects ===
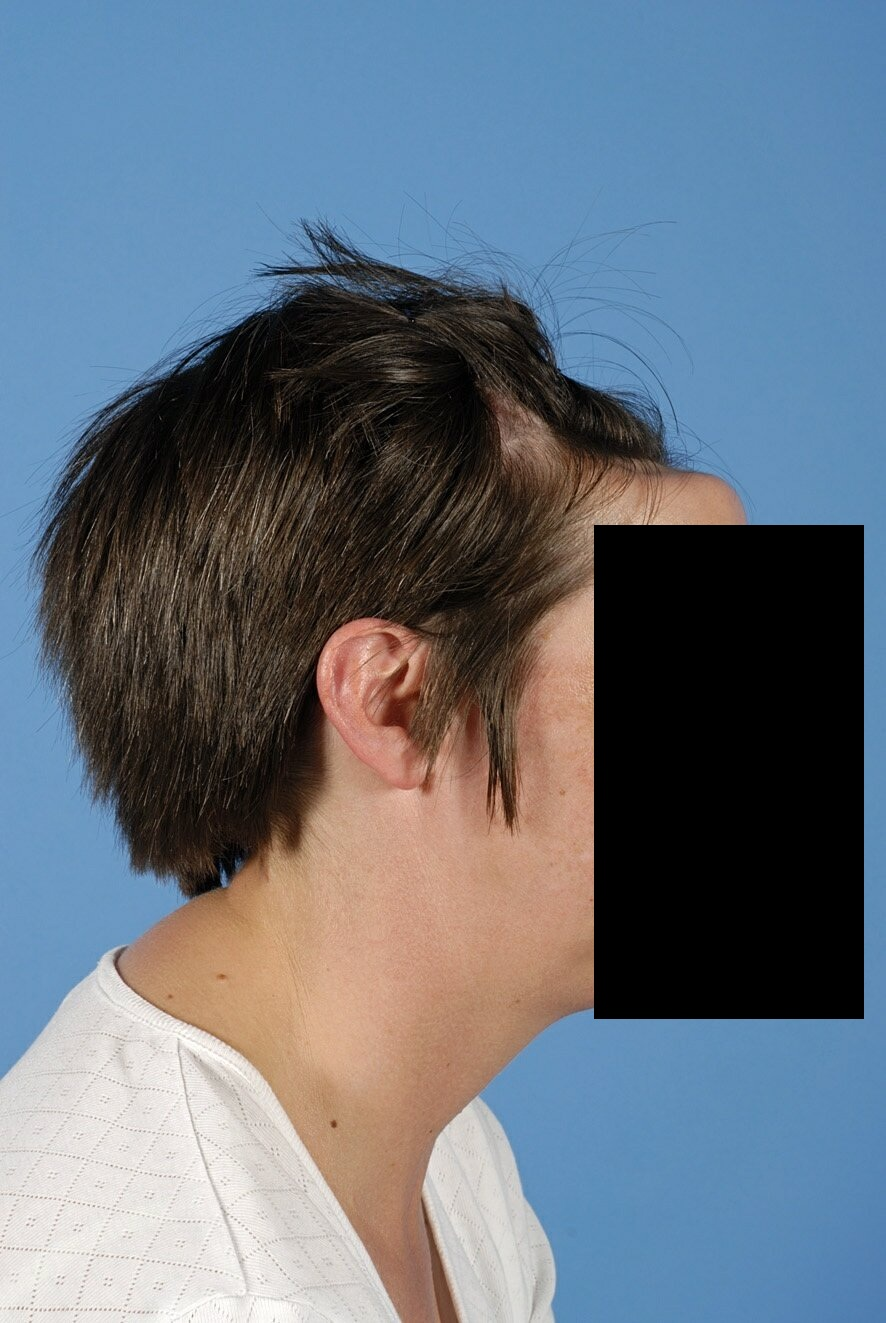
Pre-operative frontal defect

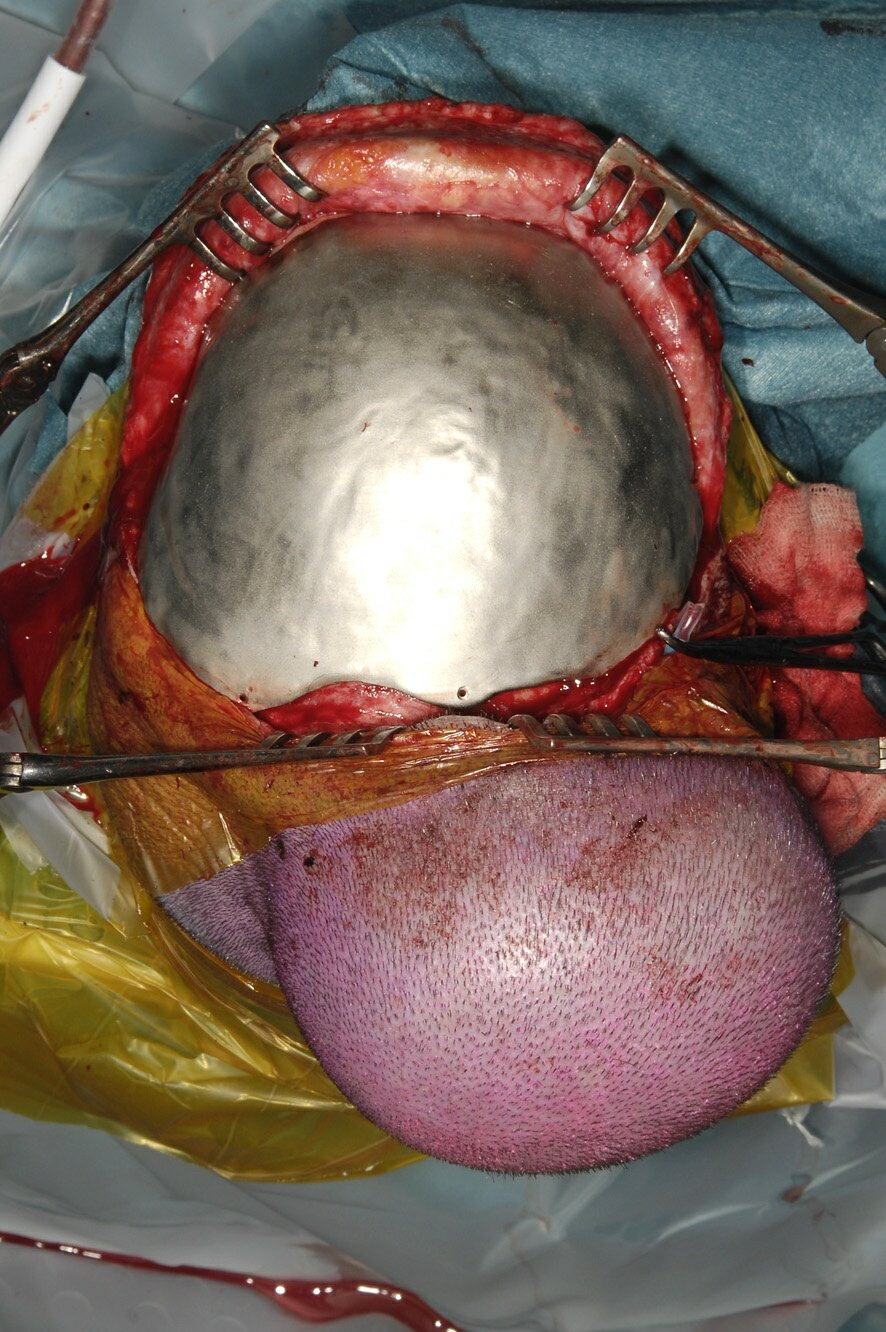
Titanium plate and fully expanded tissue expander in place

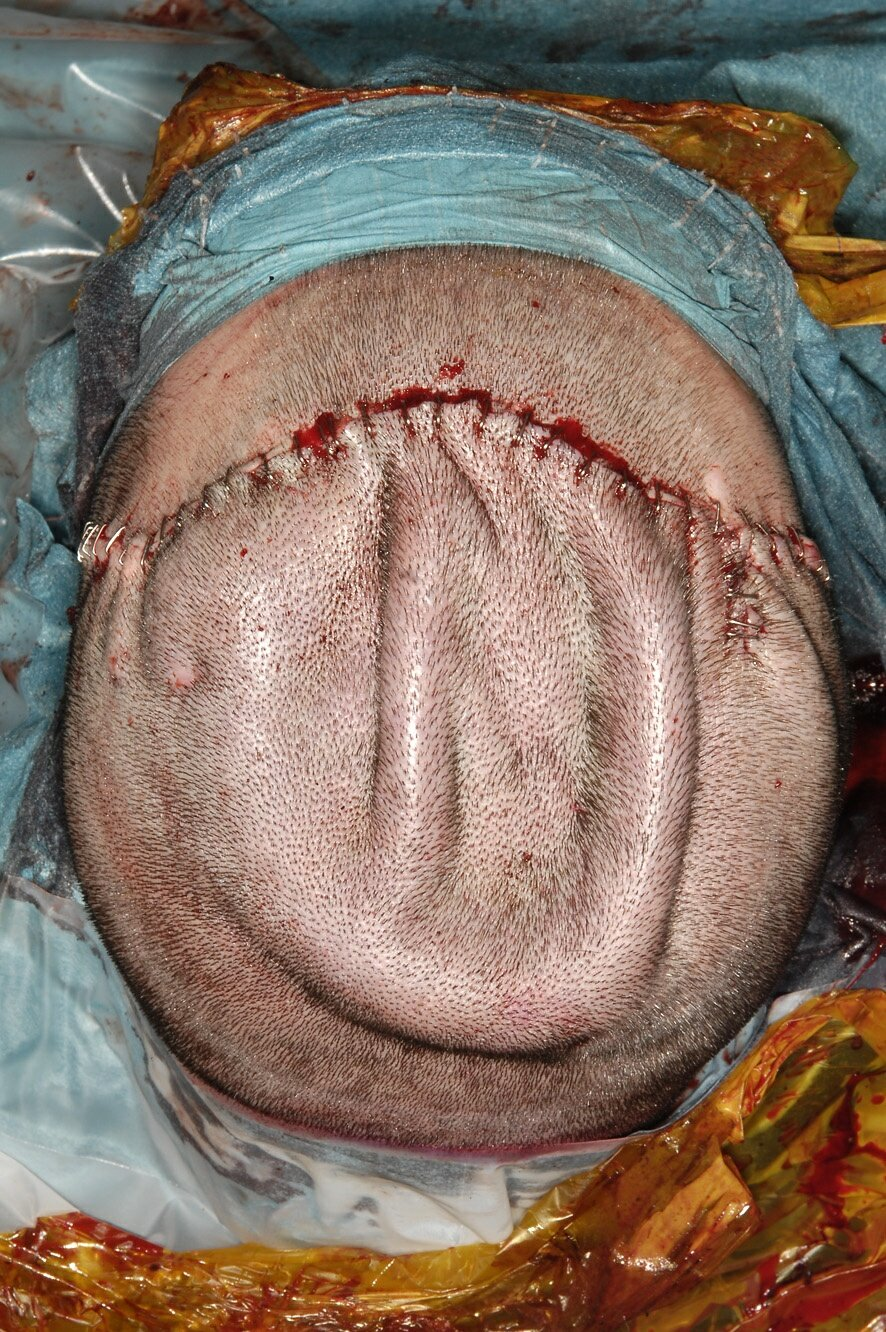
After removal of the tissue expander, the skin is transposed to close the defect.

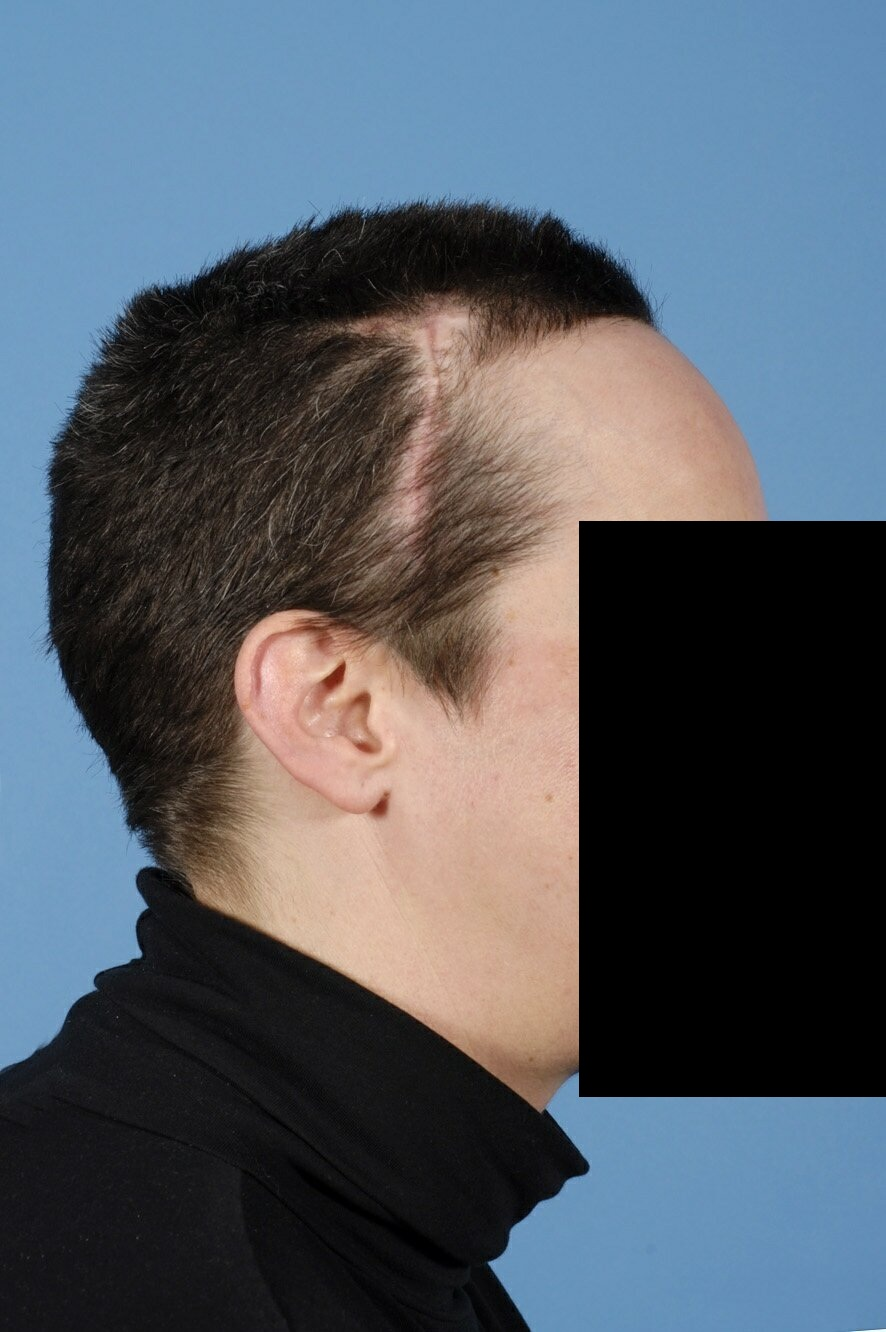
Final result

Reconstruction of a frontal skull defect and tissue expansion for coverage of the titanium plate

Skull defects should be closed in order to protect the brain. The occipital and temporal regions bear the most pressure while sleeping and therefore need to be reconstructed. Frontal bone defects cause a contour defect; therefore, aesthetic considerations are often taken into account to reconstruct this area. Midsagittal defects are of lower importance, as they allow only penetrating trauma. When the reconstruction cannot be performed immediately, wearing a helmet is advised. Skull deformities can result in high intracranial pressure which can cause complaints ranging from headaches to epilepsy-like seizures. Small defects can be filled with morcellized bone, which will consolidate in some weeks. Because of the anatomy of the skull, the external table can be split off the internal table and then be moved over the defect. Rib grafts (whether or not accompanied with the latissimus dorsi muscle) are suitable for larger defects and can bear pressure, but do not cover the whole defect. Implants can be used as well, but are not preferred in patients who are to be irradiated or recently have had an infection or necrosis, because of the increased risk of infection and extrusion. These implants can be factory-made out of metal (titanium), synthetic materials (PMMA, PEEK) or synthetic body-own material (Hydroxylapatite). In the pictures, a reconstruction using a titanium plate is shown. The skull contour has been restored.

=== Soft tissue defects ===
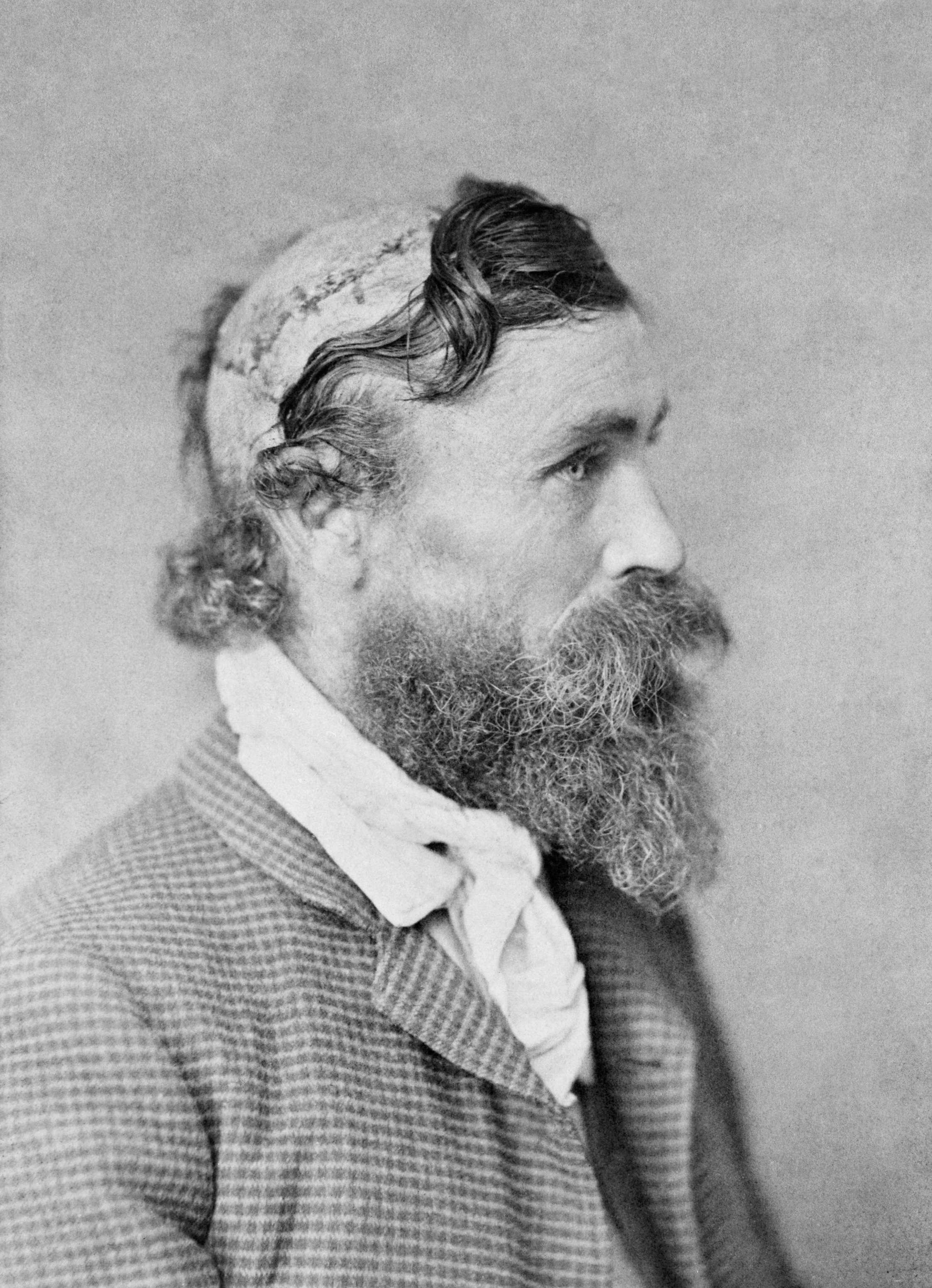
1890, Robert McGee, scalped in 1864

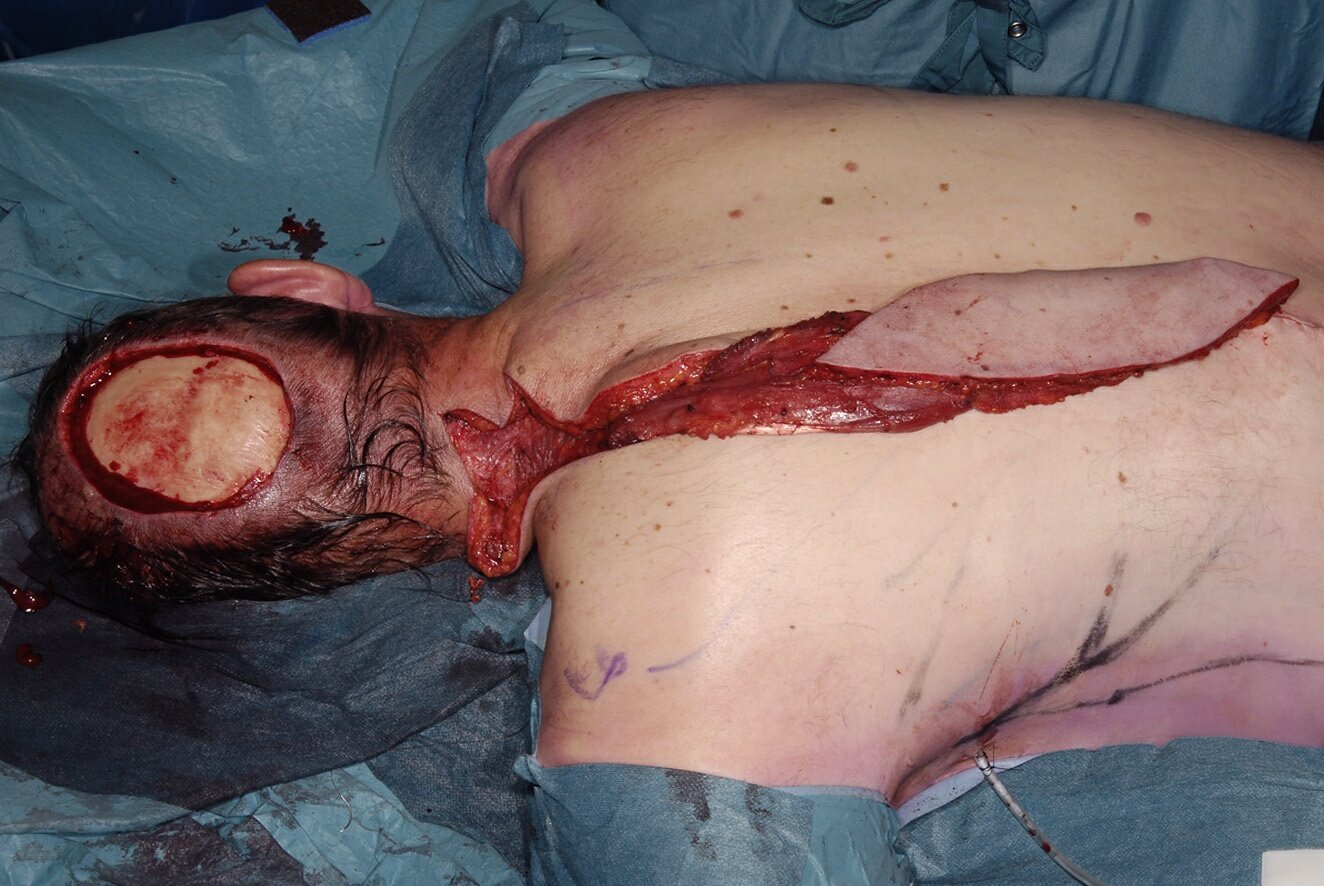
Occipital scalp defect before closure with a regional trapezius flap

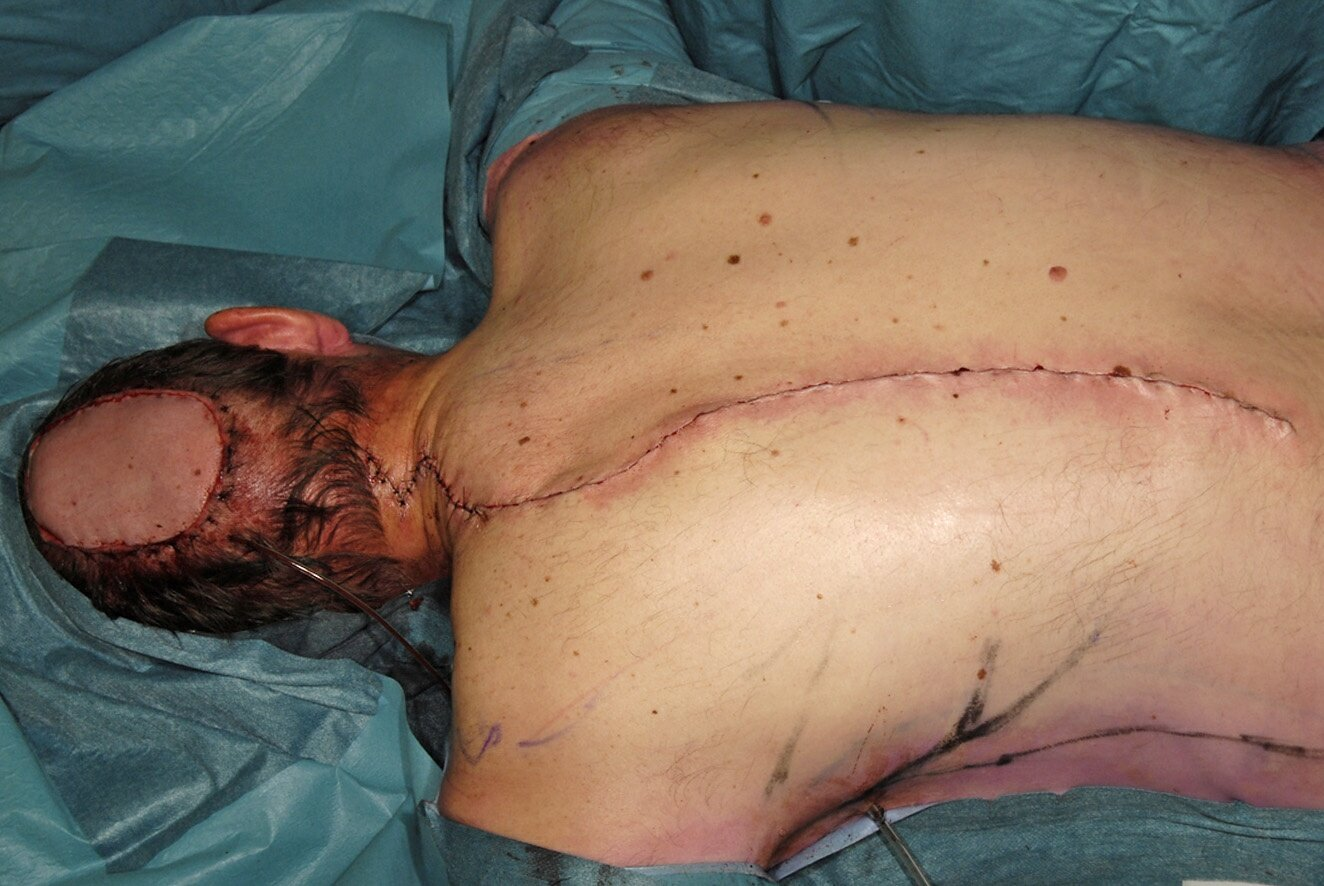
After transposition of the flap and closure of all wounds

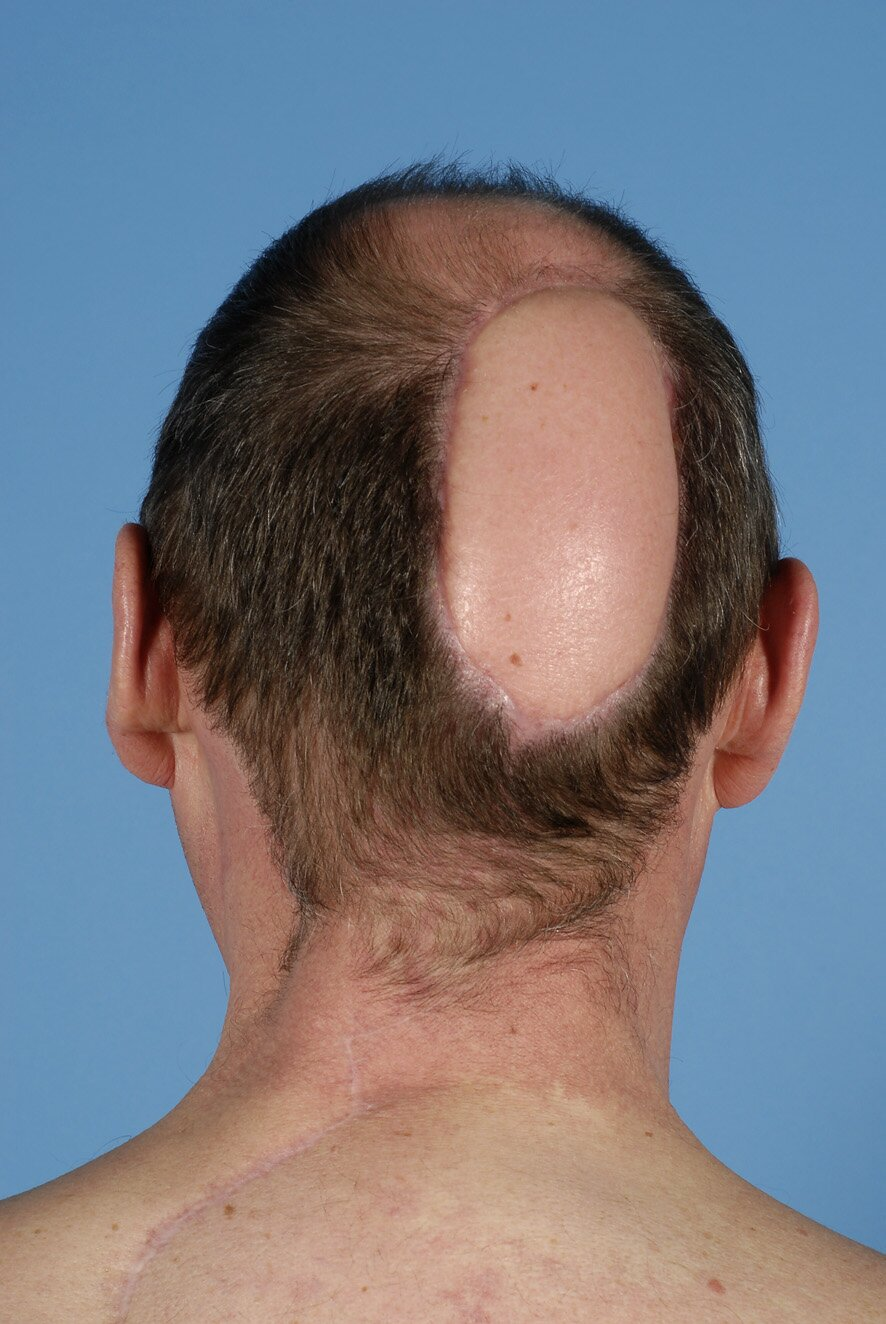
Final result

Reconstruction of an occipital scalp defect using a pedicled myocutaneous trapezius flap

If the periosteum or underlying muscles (frontalis, occipitalis, temporalis) are intact, secondary closure by granulation is possible. Before surgical intervention this was the only option available, as used to treat Robert McGee in 1864. Considering modern aesthetic standards, a better option is the use of split-thickness or full-thickness skin grafts, which is also quicker. When bulk is needed for a better contour a free flap is used, or as shown in the pictures, a regional flap.

== Skin reconstruction ==
=== Local reconstruction ===
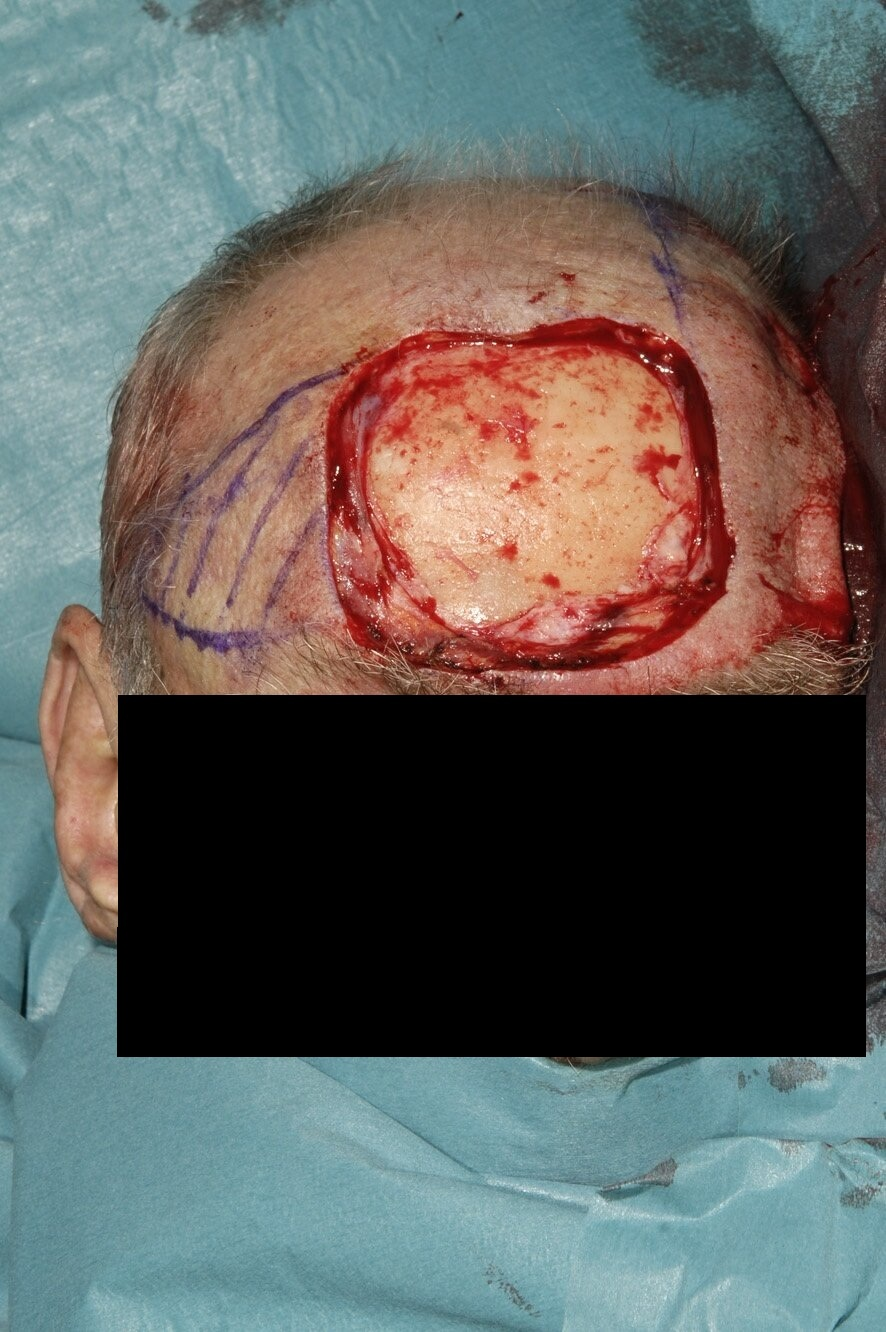
Frontal scalp defect

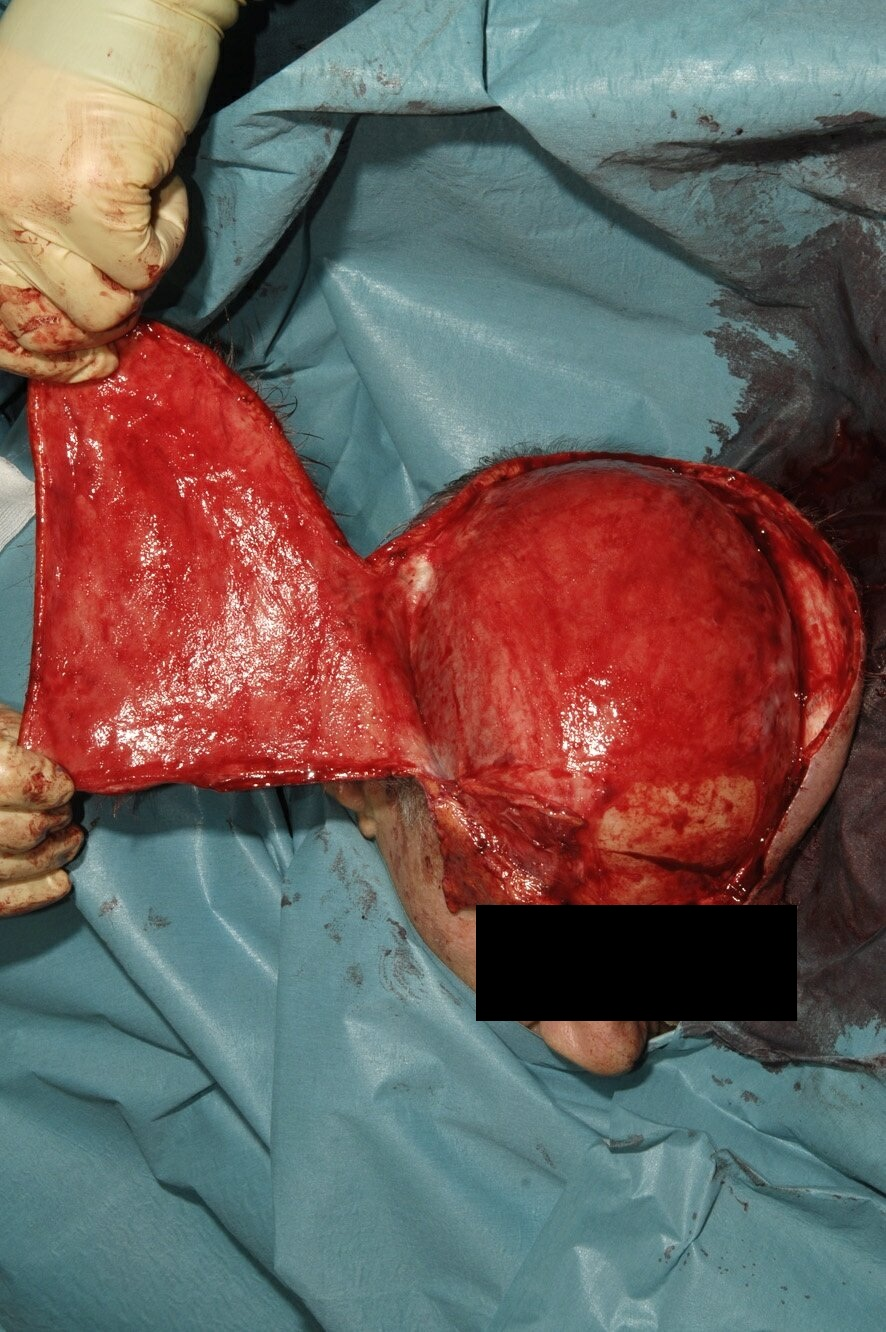
Full-thickness scalp flap lifted

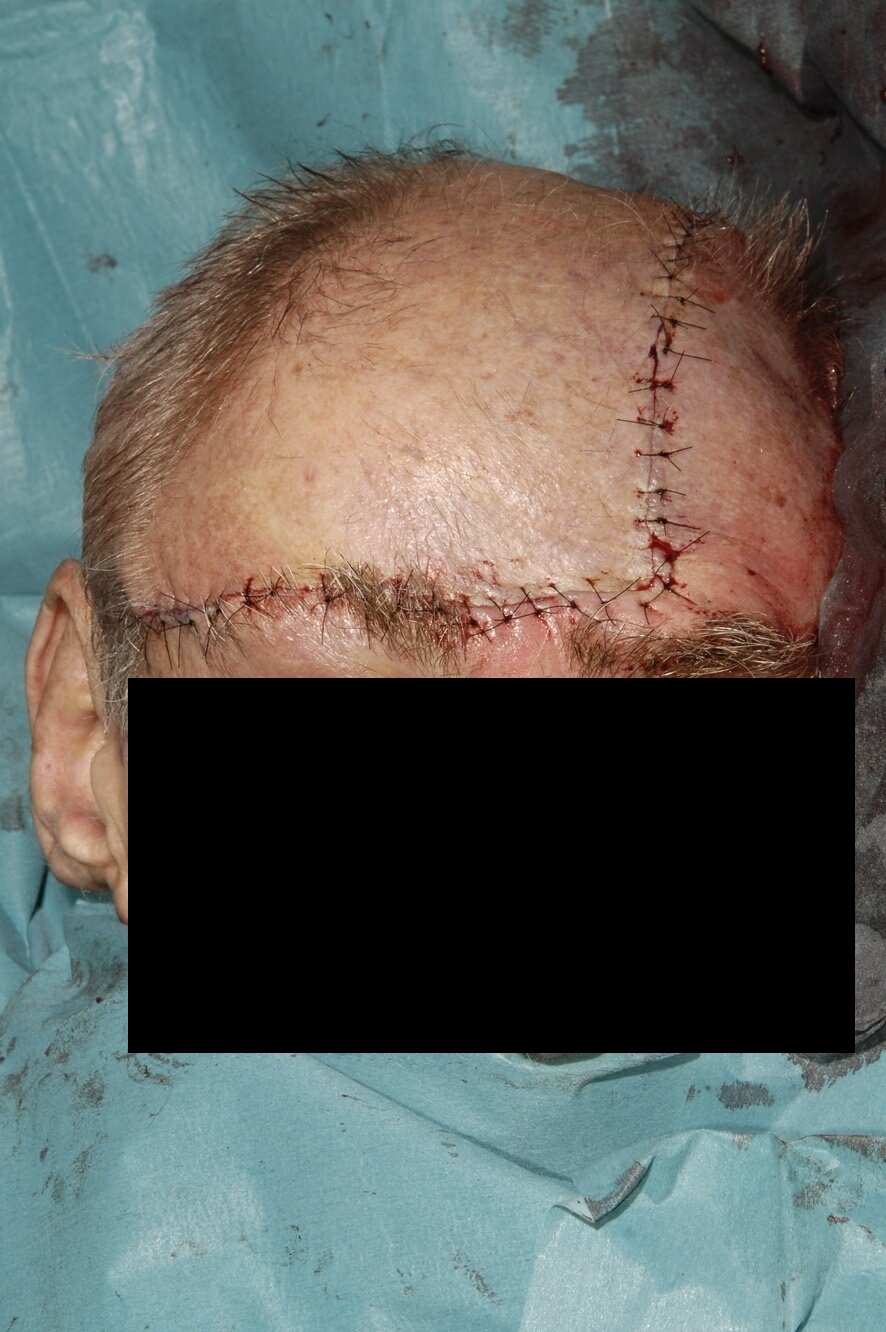
Flap rotated and wounds closed primarily

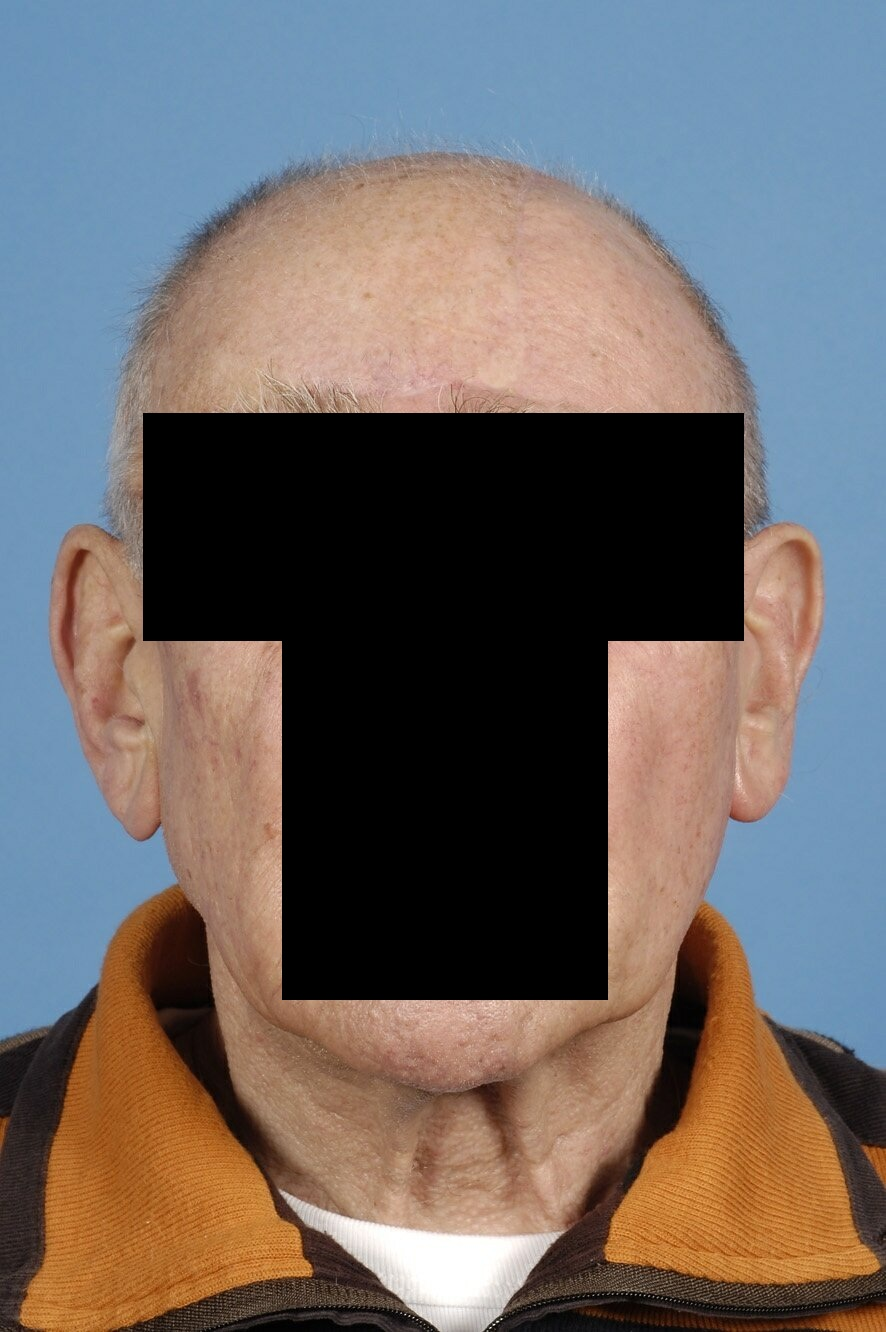
Final result

Frontal scalp defect closed with a rotation flap

If the skin defect does not exceed 3 cm in diameter, it can be closed primarily. If this is not possible without tension, the surrounding loose connective tissue can be undermined to attain more mobility. Different kinds of transpositions to close the defect with adjacent skin are possible: V-Y, Z, pinwheel flaps, advancement flaps, Orticochea flaps and rotation flaps. All these transpositions generate tension of the skin and may distort hair lines. A combination of the Orticochea and rotation flaps is illustrated by the pictures about the forehead defect. Another option is secondary healing, but this is aesthetically inferior to primary closure in hair bearing areas because of the resulting alopecia. If the scalp cannot be closed primarily and local reconstruction with hair bearing skin is needed because of hair lines, tissue expansion of hair bearing skin may be possible. The expansion process is uncomfortable on the short term, but long-term results are good.

=== Regional reconstruction ===
If local reconstruction is not possible due to lack of local tissue, regional reconstruction is the next rung on the reconstructive ladder. This includes pedicled flaps as the trapezius or supraclavicular flap or tissue expansion of nearby regions. Alternatively, the Crane principle, as described by Millard in 1969, can be used. A healthy part is used to resurface the defect and when this flap takes, the skin is returned to its original site leaving the subcutaneous tissue on the defect, which then needs a split skin graft.

=== Skin grafts ===
If only skin is missing and underlying galea, muscle or connective tissue are intact, a skin graft can be used. A skin graft needs healthy, vascularised tissue beneath it to take; otherwise it will become necrotic.

=== Free flap ===
Free flaps are usually the best solution for reconstruction of large defects that cannot be closed locally and that have unfavourable wound conditions such as severe infection, exposed sinuses, dura or brain tissue, CSF leakage or radiation damage. This method is the most complex of the reconstructive ladder. In scalp reconstruction free flaps have the great benefit of being completely detached from their original location ("donor site") before transferral to the scalp, which makes the inset easier than for pedicled flaps. Another advantage is that free flaps provide a more robust vascular supply to the wound compared to pedicled flaps, controlling infection and radiation induced damage. In addition, muscle or myocutaneous free flaps provide additional bulk that obliterates empty spaces (e.g. exposed sinuses) and covers dura mater defects more than all other options, reducing postoperative wound infections and CSF leakages. Disadvantages are the complexity of the operation, leading to prolonged operation times, the need for specialised personnel, and the chance for total flap necrosis due to microvascular complications. Another challenge with the use of free flaps is to achieve an aesthetically pleasing result with good color and contour match, especially if the defect is deep.

== Outcome ==
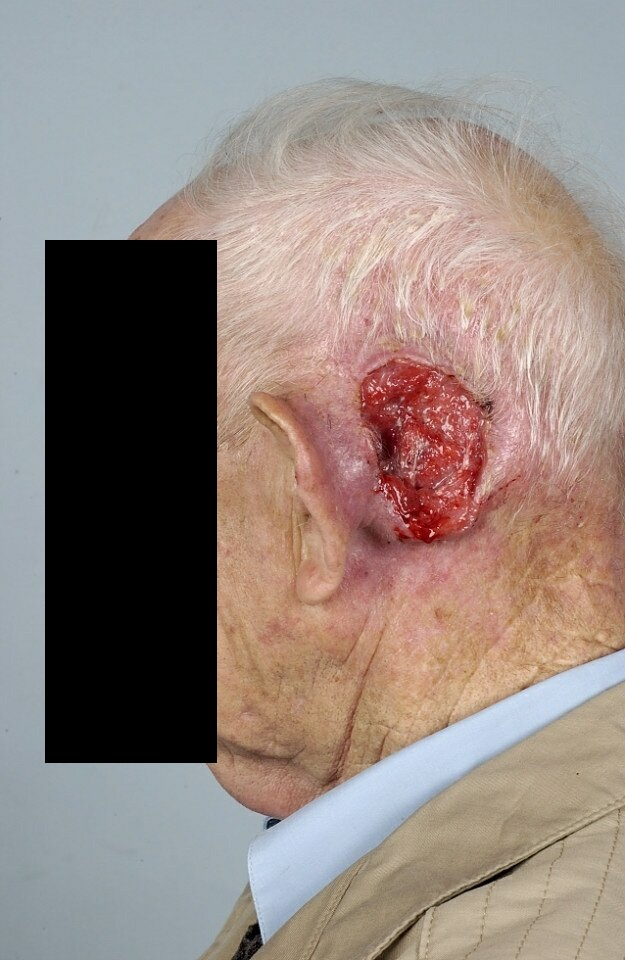
Retroauricular squamous cell carcinoma

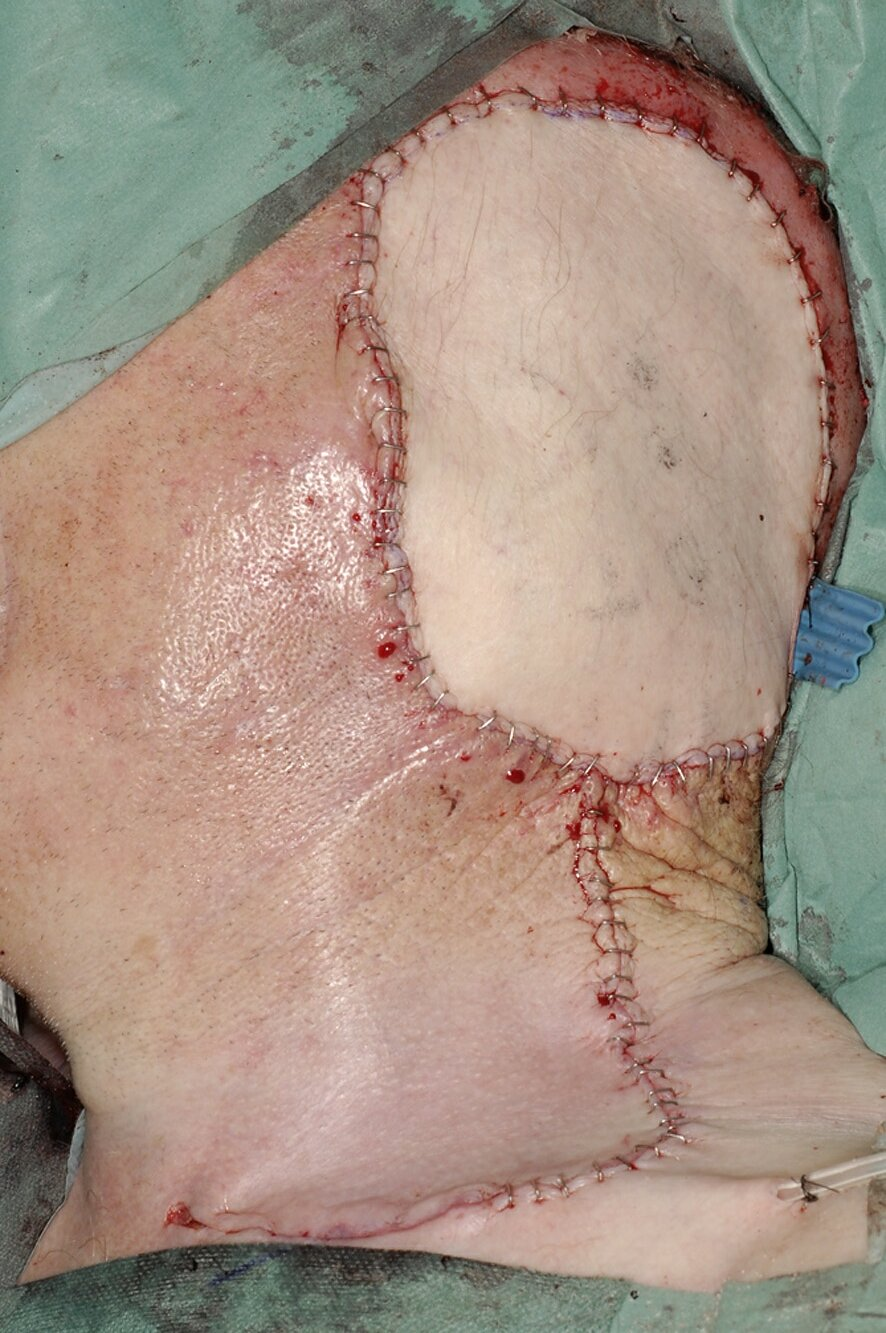
A free ALT flap for coverage; a selective neck dissection was also performed.

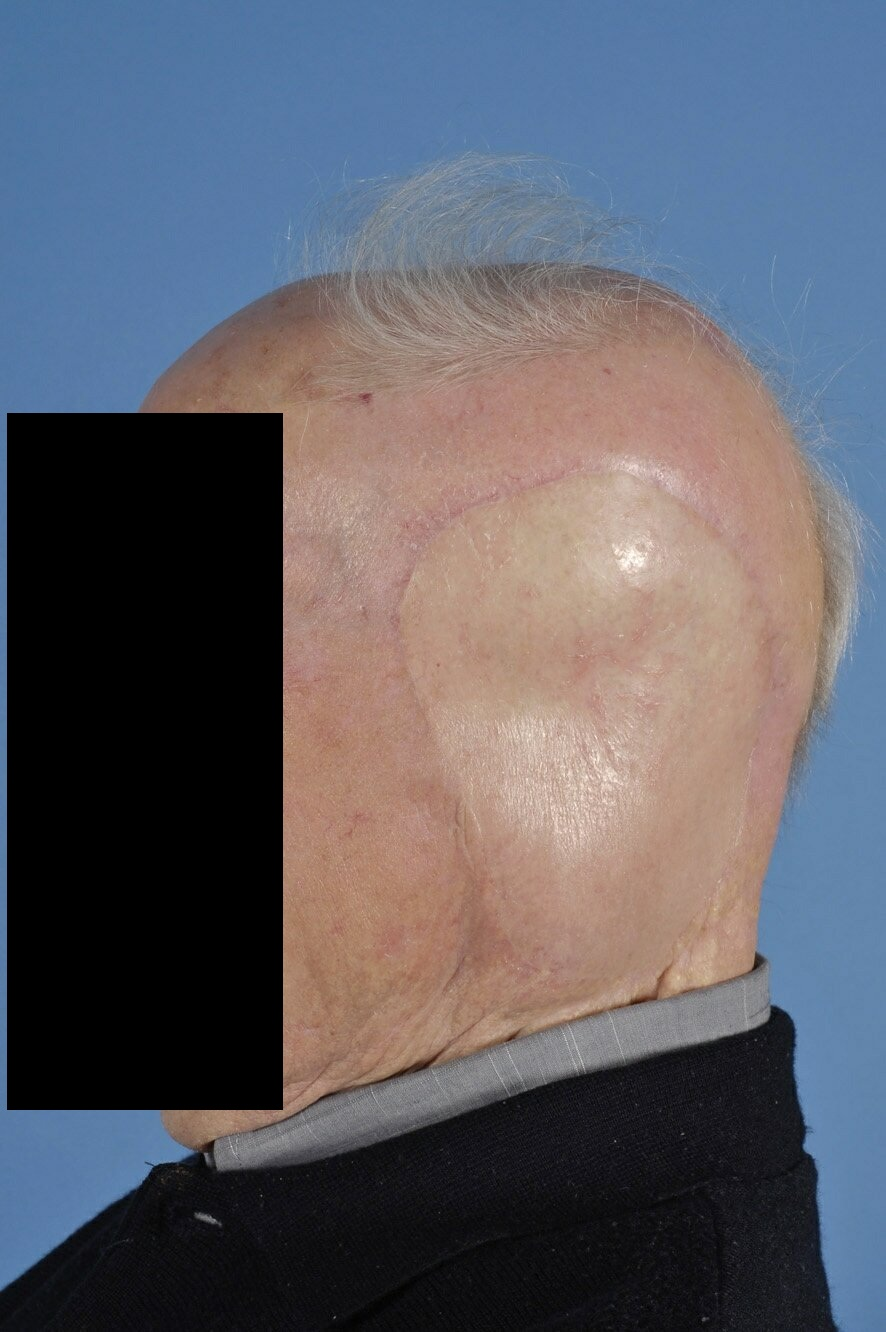
Final result after radiation therapy, needing an ear prothesis

Reconstruction of a lateral full thickness scalp defect with a free ALT flap

As the incidence of basal cell carcinoma and squamous-cell carcinoma rises, so does the need for reconstructions after radical excision of these skin malignancies. Reconstructive options depend on location and size. Most of the time the problem is not solved in just one operation, because small adjustments are necessary for good aesthetic results. Further postoperative treatment modalities as radiation therapy and chemotherapy may impact the final result.

== Aesthetic and functional ==
Temporal and forehead defects offer a more difficult aesthetic challenge and are best covered with a thin flap so the aesthetic unit appears equal. Although the forehead is not a highly important aesthetic unit, color mismatch and bulkiness will draw attention quickly. Free flap reconstruction of the forehead can be bulky and color match is variable and depends on the ethnic and genetic background. Some people are not satisfied with the outcome and may experience psychological problems such as low self-confidence or even depression. Sometimes a second operation is needed to improve skin color. Overgrafting the skin with skin grafts from the scalp can improve color match.

== Complications ==
Post-operative complications can be divided into donor-site and recipient-site problems. Donor-site complications include wound infection, hematoma, and seroma. Recipient-site complications include (total or partial) flap necrosis, wound infection, dehiscence, hematoma or skin graft failure. To avoid major bleeding or sensibility disorders, the anatomy of the scalp must be respected, such as by making incisions parallel to rather than across blood vessels. Due to the rich perfusion, scalp injuries can lead to serious bleeding, which may be difficult to stem if the cut blood vessels retract into the fat.
