= Auricular ligament =

Auricular ligament may refer to:

- Anterior auricular ligament
- Posterior auricular ligament
- Superior auricular ligament
