= Posterior auricular =

Posterior auricular may refer to:

- Posterior auricular artery
- Posterior auricular muscle
- Posterior auricular vein
