= Auricular veins =

Auricular veins can refer to:

- Anterior auricular veins (venae auriculares anteriores)
- Posterior auricular vein (Vena auricularis posterior)
