= Temporal branches =

In anatomy, temporal branches can refer to any one of several different structures near the temple or temporal bone:

- Nerves
  - Temporal branches of the facial nerve - "rami temporales nervi facialis"
  - superficial temporal branches of auriculotemporal nerve - "rami temporales superficiales nervi auriculotemporalis"
- Arteries
  - Temporal branches of the middle meningeal artery
  - Temporal branches of the middle cerebral artery
  - posterior temporal branches of lateral occipital artery - "rami temporales posteriores arteriae occipitalis lateralis"
  - anterior temporal branches of lateral occipital artery - "rami temporales anteriores arteriae occipitalis lateralis"
  - Temporal branches of the superficial temporal artery
    - Anterior temporal branch of superficial temporal artery - "ramus frontalis arteriae temporalis superficialis"
    - Posterior temporal branch of superficial temporal artery - "ramus parietalis arteriae temporalis superficialis"
