= Anterior auricular veins =

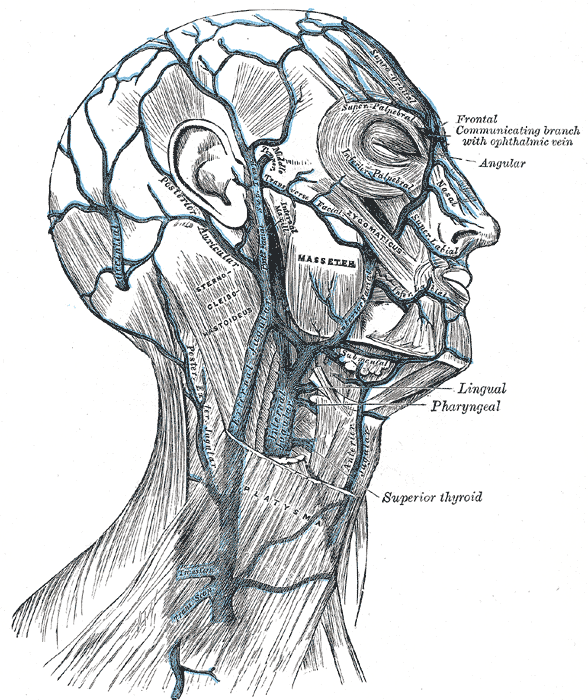
- Veins of the head and neck (anterior auricular veins not labeled, but region is visible)

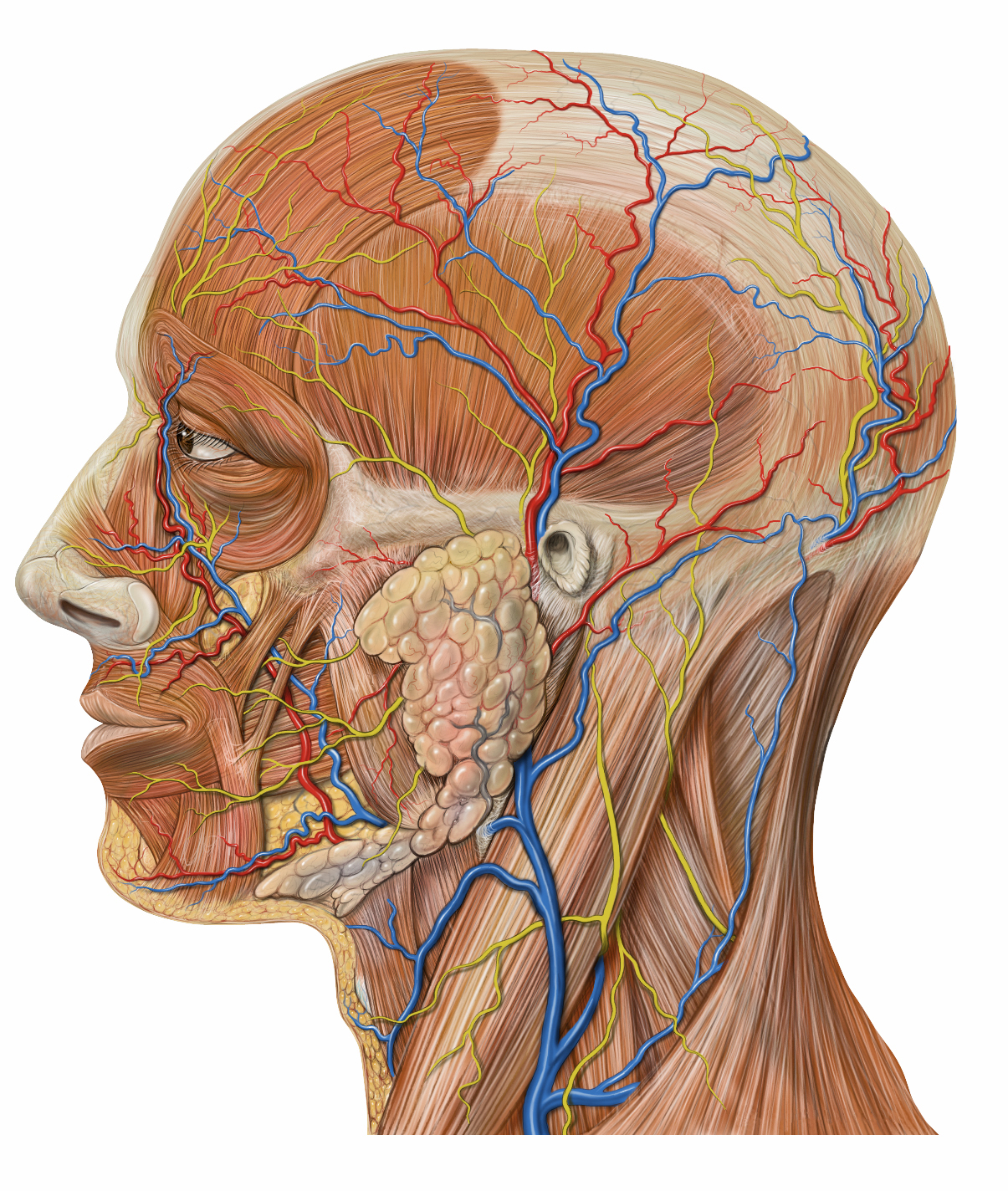
- Lateral head anatomy detail

Details
- Drains to: Superficial temporal vein
- Artery: Anterior auricular branches of superficial temporal artery

Identifiers
- Latin: venae auriculares anteriores
- TA98: A12.3.05.040
- TA2: 4840
- FMA: 70853

The anterior auricular veins are veins which drain the anterior aspect of the external ear. The veins drains to the superficial temporal vein.

== See also ==
- Posterior auricular vein
