= Ear canal =

Tube running from the outer ear to the middle ear

- Anatomy of the human ear.

Details
- Precursor: Groove (cleft) of the first branchial arch
- Artery: Anterior part: superficial temporal artery posterior part: posterior auricular artery
- Vein: Superficial temporal veins, external jugular vein, pterygoid plexus
- Nerve: Auriculotemporal nerve, great auricular nerve, auricular branch of vagus nerve
- Lymph: Superficial cervical lymph nodes, deep cervical lymph nodes

Identifiers
- Latin: meatus acusticus externus
- MeSH: D004424
- TA98: A15.3.01.045
- TA2: 6867
- FMA: 61734

The ear canal (external acoustic meatus, external auditory meatus, EAM) is a pathway running from the outer ear to the middle ear. The adult human ear canal extends from the auricle to the eardrum and is about 25 millimetres (1 in) in length and 7 millimetres (0.3 in) in diameter.

== Structure ==
The human ear canal is divided into two parts. The elastic cartilage part forms the outer third of the canal; its anterior and lower wall are cartilaginous, whereas its superior and back wall are fibrous. The cartilage is the continuation of the cartilage framework of auricle. The cartilaginous portion of the ear canal contains small hairs and specialized sweat glands, called ceruminous glands, which produce cerumen (ear wax). The bony part forms the inner two thirds. The bony part is much shorter in children and is only a ring (annulus tympanicus) in the newborn. The layer of epithelium encompassing the bony portion of the ear canal is much thinner and therefore, more sensitive in comparison to the cartilaginous portion.

Size and shape of the canal vary among individuals. The canal is approximately 25 millimetres (1 in) long and 7 millimetres (0.28 in) in diameter. It has a sigmoid form and runs from behind and above downward and forward. On the cross-section, it is of oval shape. These are important factors to consider when fitting earplugs.

== Disorders ==
Due to its relative exposure to the outside world, the ear canal is susceptible to diseases and other disorders. Some disorders include:

- Atresia of the ear canal
- Cerumen impaction
- Bone exposure, caused by the wearing away of skin in the canal
- Auditory canal osteoma (bony outgrowths of the temporal bone)
- Cholesteatoma
- Contact dermatitis of the ear canal
- Fungal infection (otomycosis)
- Ear mites in animals
- Ear myiasis, an extremely rare infestation of maggots
- Foreign body in ear
- Granuloma, a scar usually caused by tympanostomy tubes
- Otitis externa (swimmer's ear), bacteria-caused inflammation of the ear canal
- Stenosis, a gradual closing of the canal

== Earwax ==
Earwax, also known as cerumen, is a yellowish, waxy substance secreted in the ear canals. It plays an important role in the human ear canal, assisting in cleaning and lubrication, and also provides some protection from bacteria, fungi, and insects. Excess or impacted cerumen can press against the eardrum and/or occlude the external auditory canal and impair hearing, causing conductive hearing loss. If left untreated, cerumen impaction can also increase the risk of developing an infection within the ear canal.

== Additional images ==
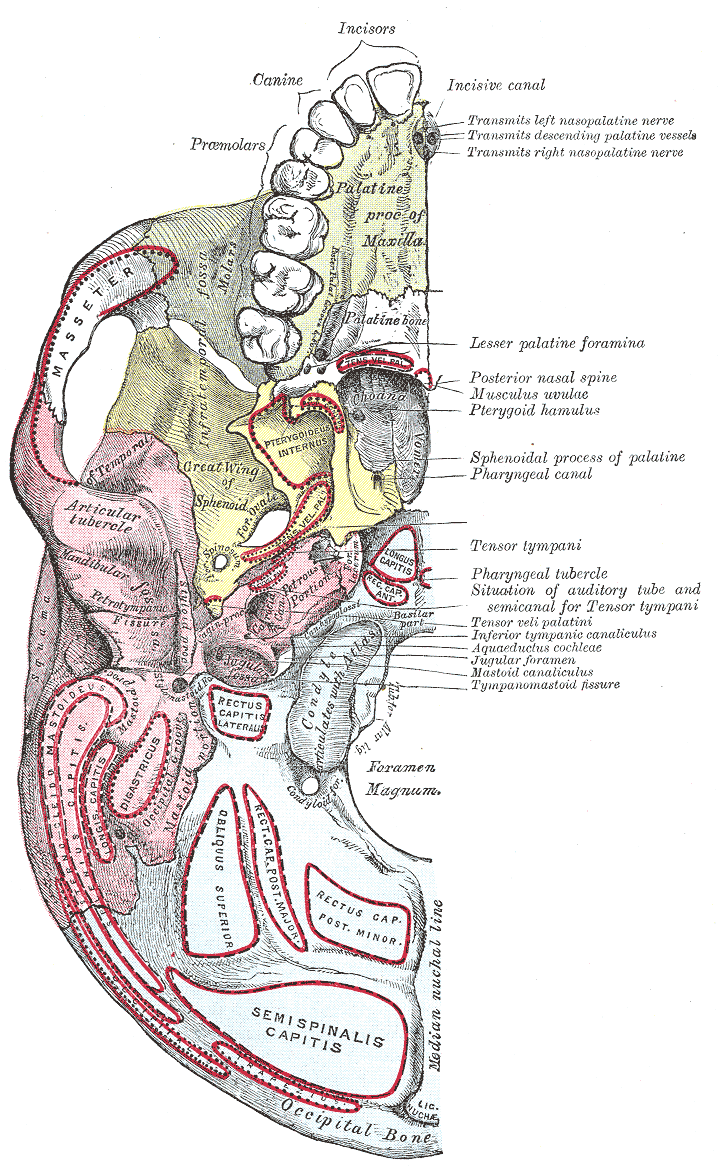
Base of skull. Inferior surface.

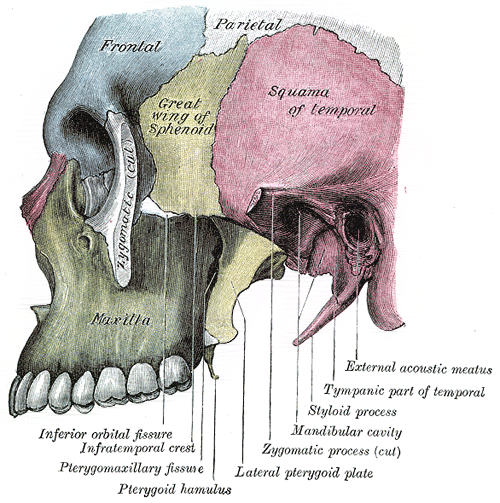
Left infratemporal fossa.

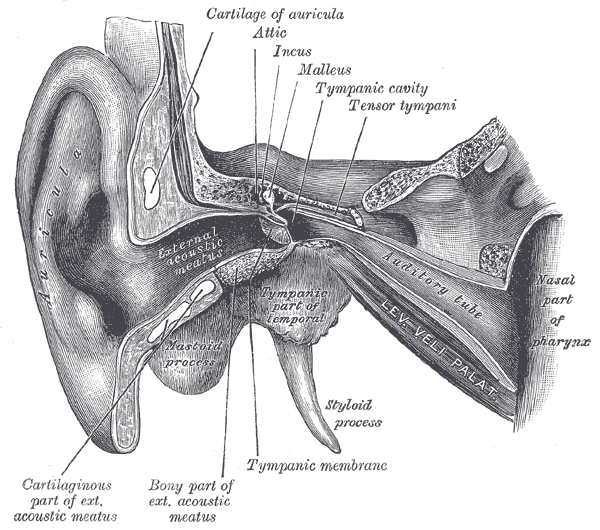
External and middle ear, opened from the front. Right side.

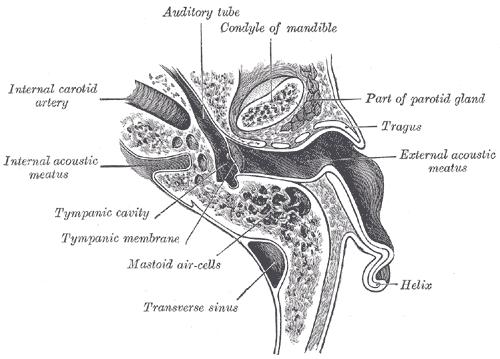
Horizontal section through left ear; upper half of section.

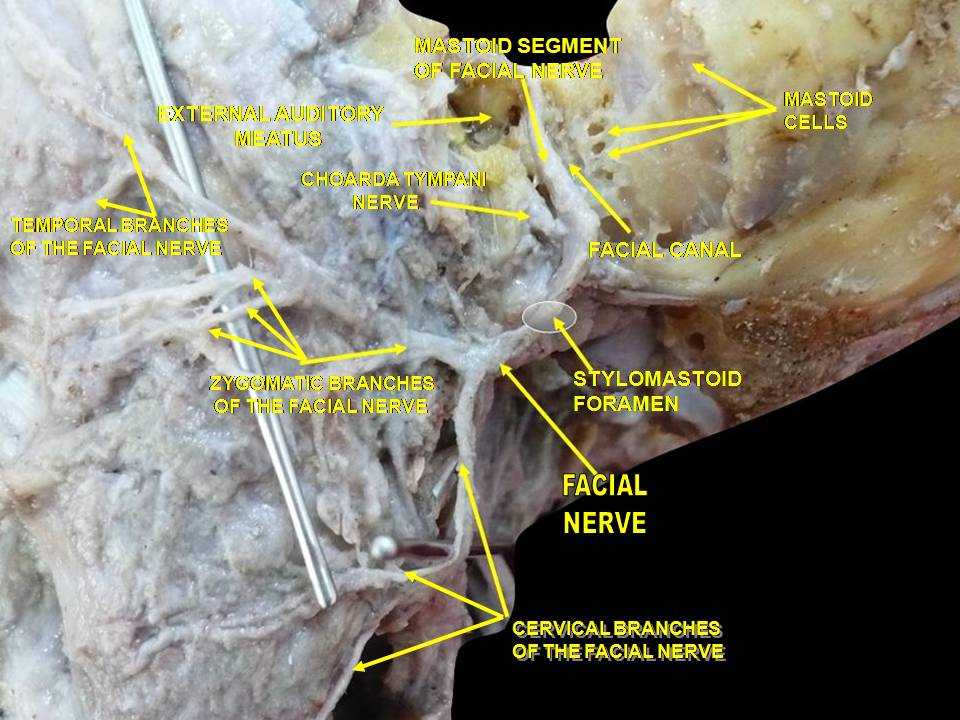
Lateral head anatomy detail. Facial nerve dissection.

== See also ==
- List of specialized glands within the human integumentary system
