= Superior auricular =

Superior auricular may refer to:

- Superior auricular ligament, one of the ligaments that connects the auricles to the head
- Superior auricular muscle, a muscle located above the outer ear
