= Transverse facial =

Transverse facial can refer to:

- Transverse facial artery
- Transverse facial vein, from the superficial temporal vein
