= External carotid artery =

Major artery of the head and neck

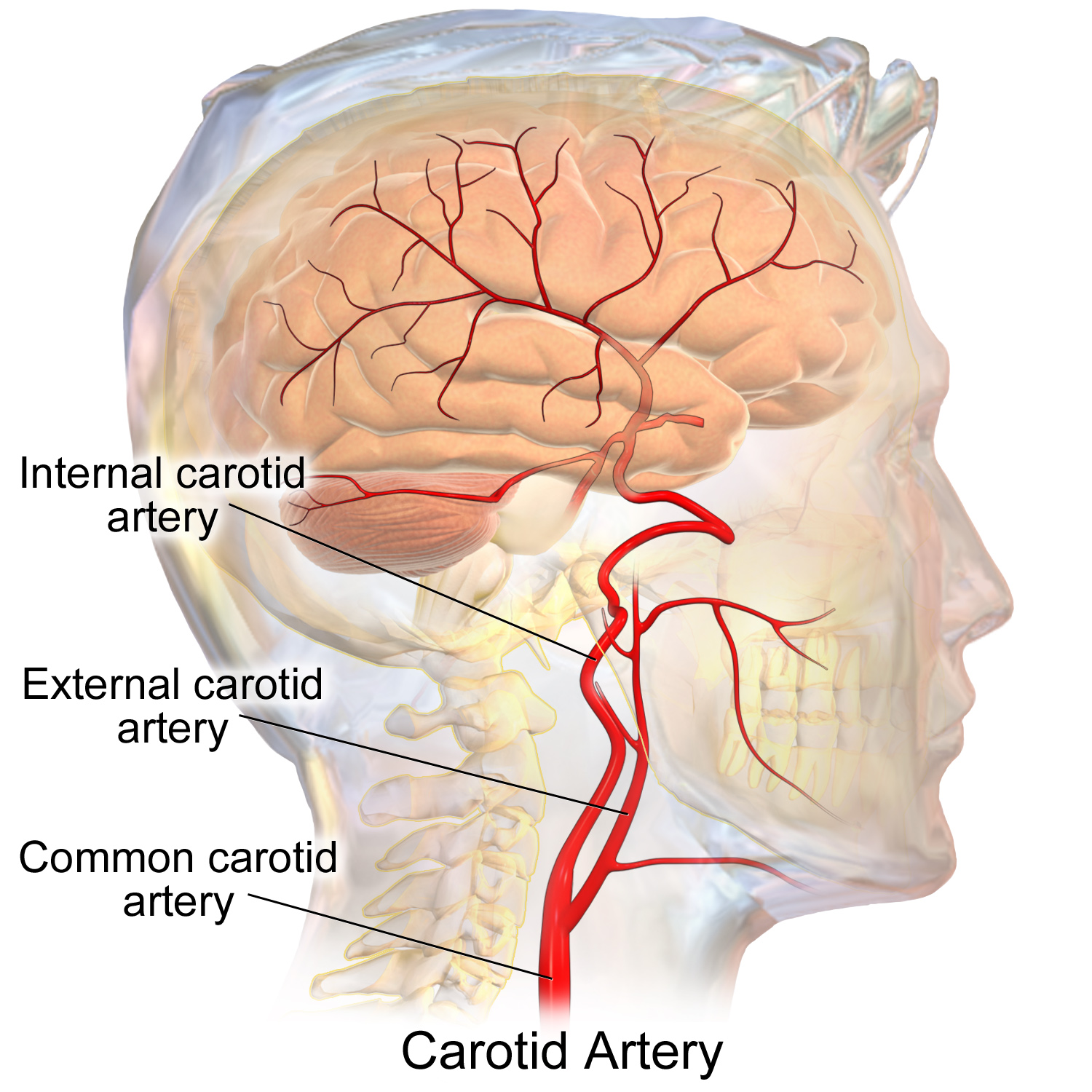
- The external carotid artery arises from the common carotid artery and supplies structures in the face and neck.

Details
- Precursor: 1 and 2. aortic arches
- Source: Common carotid artery
- Branches: Superior thyroid, lingual, facial, ascending pharyngeal, occipital, posterior auricular, maxillary, superficial temporal

Identifiers
- Latin: arteria carotis externa
- MeSH: D002342
- TA98: A12.2.05.001
- TA2: 4369
- FMA: 10635

The external carotid artery is the major artery of the head and upper neck. It arises from the common carotid artery. It terminates by splitting into the superficial temporal and maxillary artery within the parotid gland.

== Structure ==
=== Origin ===
The external carotid artery arises from the common carotid artery just inferior to the upper border of the thyroid cartilage.

At its origin, this artery is closer to the skin and more medial than the internal carotid, and is situated within the carotid triangle.

=== Course and fate ===
It curves to pass anterosuperiorly before inclining posterior-ward to reach the space posterior the neck of the mandible, where it divides into the superficial temporal and maxillary artery within the parotid gland.

It rapidly diminishes in size as it travels up the neck, owing to the number and large size of its branches.

=== Relations ===
At the origin, external carotid artery is more medial than internal carotid artery. When external carotid artery ascends the neck, it lies more lateral than internal carotid artery.

The external carotid artery is covered by the skin, superficial fascia, platysma muscle, deep fascia, and anterior margin of the sternocleidomastoid; it is crossed by the hypoglossal nerve, by the lingual, ranine, common facial, and superior thyroid veins; and by the digastricus and stylohyoideus muscles; higher up it passes deeply into the substance of the parotid gland, where it lies deep to the facial nerve and the junction of the temporal and internal maxillary veins.

Medial to it are the hyoid bone, the wall of the pharynx, the superior laryngeal nerve, and a portion of the parotid gland.

Posterior to it, near its origin, is the superior laryngeal nerve; and higher up, it is separated from the internal carotid by the styloglossus and stylopharyngeus muscles, the glossopharyngeal nerve, the pharyngeal branch of the vagus, and part of the parotid gland.

=== Branches ===
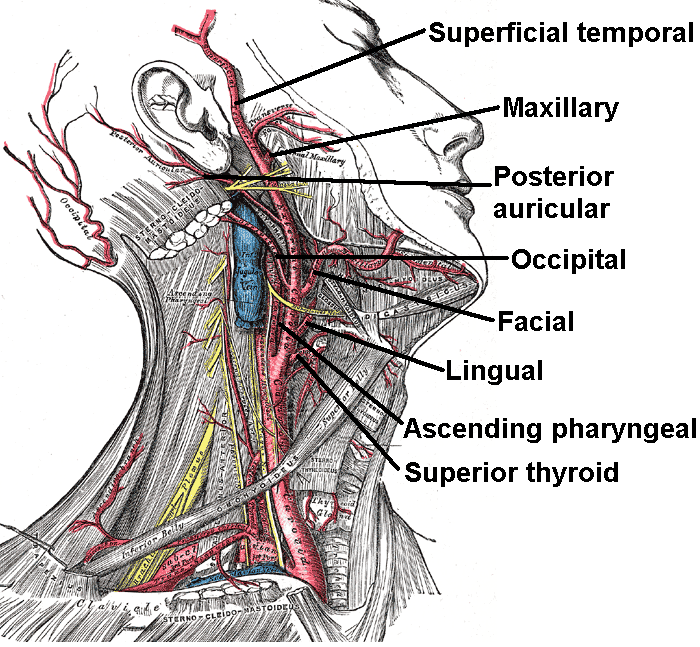
Branches of external carotid artery.

As the artery travels upwards, it gives the following branches:

- In the carotid triangle:
  - Superior thyroid artery, arising from its anterior aspect
  - Ascending pharyngeal artery - arising from medial, or deep, aspect
  - Lingual artery - arising from its anterior aspect
  - Facial artery - arise from its anterior aspect
  - Occipital artery - arising from its posterior aspect
  - Posterior auricular artery - arising from posterior aspect

The external carotid artery terminates as two branches:

- Maxillary artery
- Superficial temporal artery

=== Anastomoses ===
The superior thyroid artery anastomoses with inferior thyroid artery, where the latter arises from thyrocervical trunk of the subclavian artery.

Terminal branch of facial artery anastomose with ophthalmic artery of internal carotid artery.

Posterior auricular artery anastomose with occipital artery, another branch of external carotid artery.

One of the branches of superficial temporal artery anastomose with lacrimal and palpebral branches of ophthalmic artery.

=== Development ===
In children, the external carotid artery is smaller than the internal carotid; but in the adult, the two vessels are of nearly equal size.

== Diagnostics ==
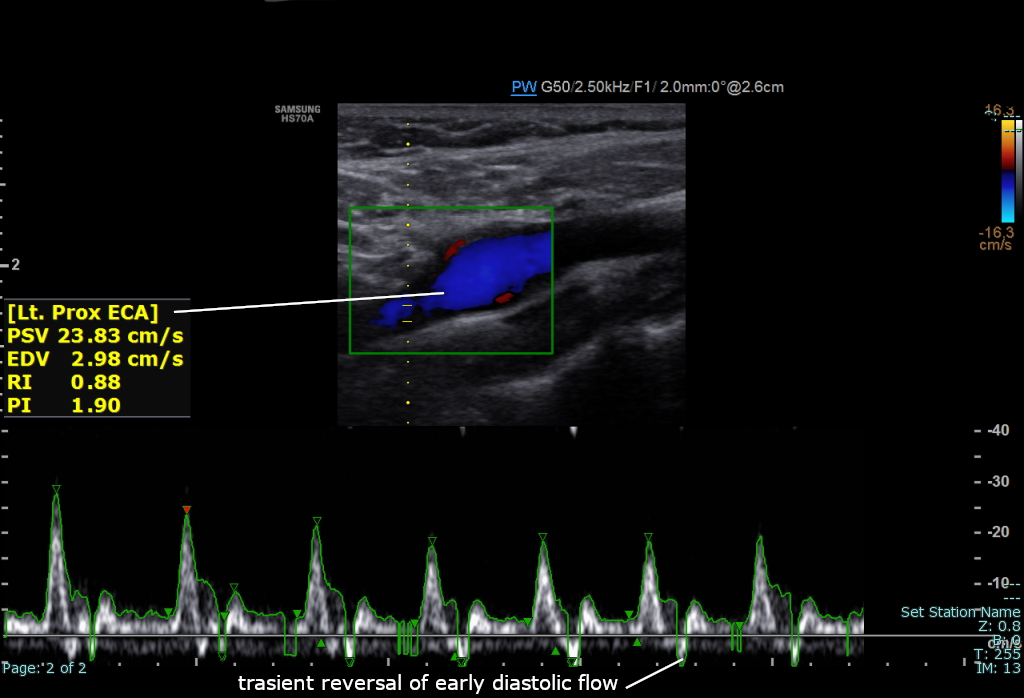
Left external carotid artery with normal spectral doppler ultrasound

The condition and health of the external carotid arteries is usually evaluated using Doppler ultrasound, CT angiogram or phase contrast magnetic resonance imaging (PC-MRI). Typically, blood flow velocities in the external carotid artery are measured as peak systolic velocity (PSV) and end diastolic velocity (EDV).

PSV values greater than 200 cm/s are considered to be predictive of more than 50% of external carotid artery stenosis.

== Additional images ==
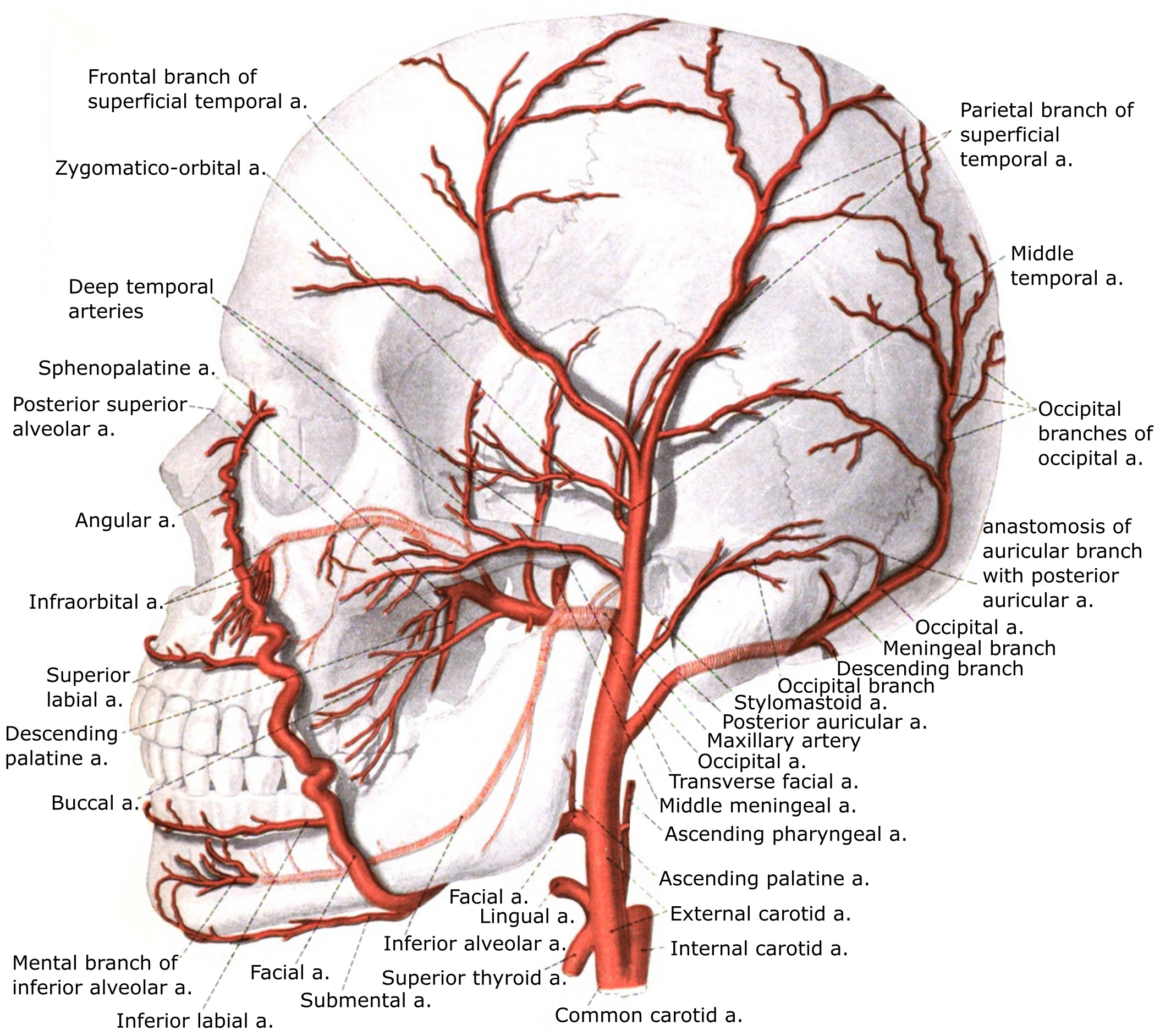
Branches of external carotid artery

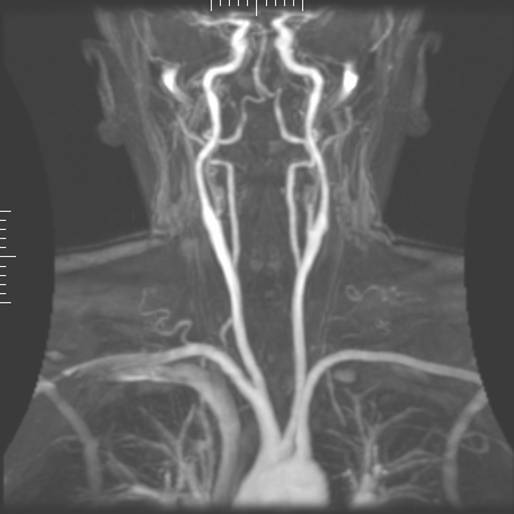
Magnetic resonance angiography
