= Anterior auricular branches =

Anterior auricular branches of superficial temporal artery
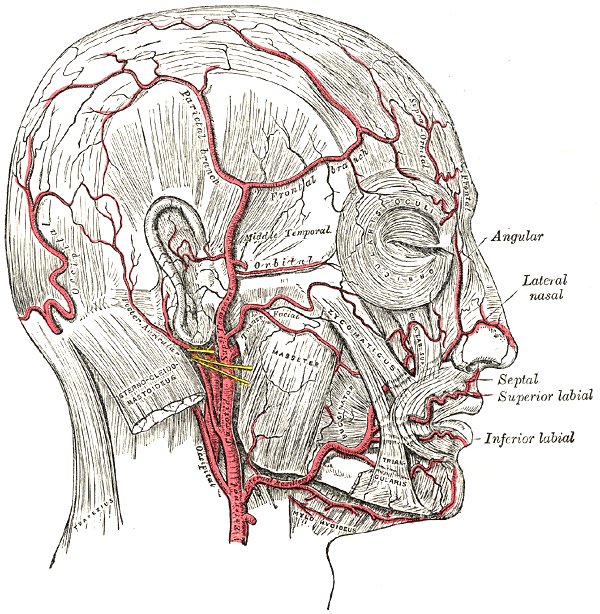
- The arteries of the face and scalp (anterior auricular visible but not labeled)

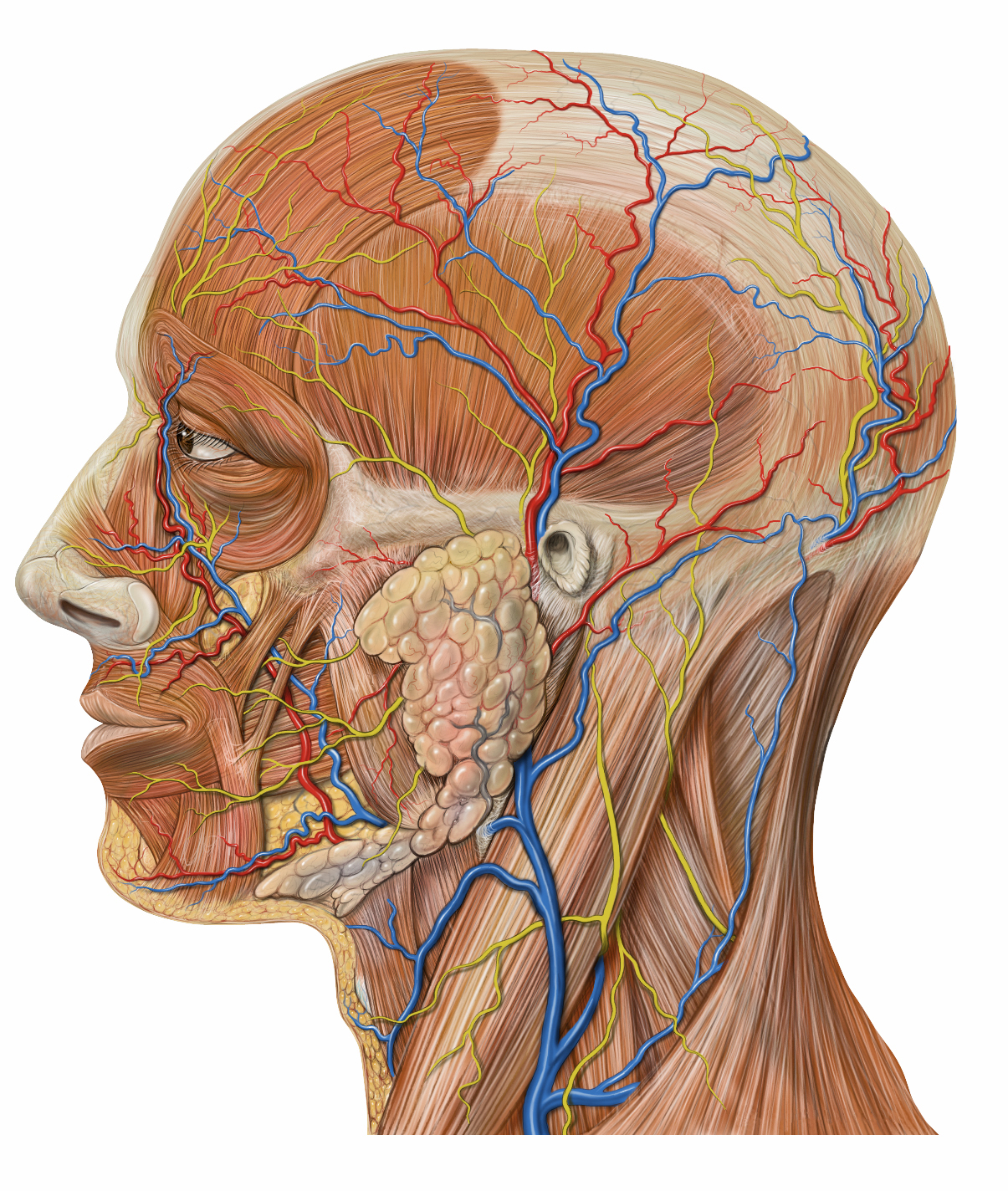
- Lateral head anatomy detail

Details
- Source: Superficial temporal artery
- Vein: Anterior auricular veins
- Supplies: External acoustic meatus and pinna

Identifiers
- Latin: rami auriculares anteriores arteriae temporalis superficialis
- TA98: A12.2.05.048
- TA2: 4417
- FMA: 71679

The anterior auricular branches of the superficial temporal artery are distributed to the anterior portion of the auricula, the lobule, and part of the external acoustic meatus, anastomosing with the posterior auricular. They supply the external acoustic meatus and the visible part of the ear.

Arterial vascular pattern of the auricle:

"The superior and the inferior anterior auricular artery provided the vascular supply to the helical rim, forming an arcade, i.e. helical rim arcade. On the superior third of the helical rim another arcade was confirmed between the superior anterior auricular artery and the posterior auricular artery (PAA), i.e. the helical arcade. The perforators of the PAA were identified lying in a vertical line 1 cm posterior to the tragus, supplying the concha, inferior crus, triangular fossa, antihelix and the earlobe." The study confirmed the constant presence of the helical rim arcade (Zilinsky-Cotofana), consistent perforating branches of the PAA, and the helical arcade (Erdman).
