= Posterior auricular ligament =

Ligament of the ear

Details
- From: Concha
- To: Temporal

Identifiers
- Latin: ligamentum auriculare posterius

The posterior auricular ligament crosses from the eminence of the concha to the mastoid process of the temporal bone.
