= Anterior auricular ligament =

Ligament of the ear

Details
- From: concha
- To: temporal

Identifiers
- Latin: ligamentum auriculare anterius
- FMA: 61036

The anterior auricular ligament crosses from the eminence of the concha to the mastoid process of the temporal bone.
