= Temple (anatomy) =

Side of the head behind the eyes

- Location of temple

- Human skull. Temporal bone is orange, and the temple overlies the temporal bone as well as overlying the sphenoid bone.

Details
- Artery: Superficial temporal artery
- Vein: Superficial temporal vein

Identifiers
- Latin: tempus
- TA98: A01.1.00.004
- TA2: 103
- FMA: 46450

The temple, also known as the pterion, is a latch where four skull bones intersect: the frontal, parietal, temporal, and sphenoid. It is located on the side of the head behind the eye between the forehead and the ear. The temporal muscle covers this area and is used during mastication.

Cladistics classifies land vertebrates based on the presence of an upper hole, a lower hole, both, or neither in the cover of dermal bone that formerly covered the temporalis muscle, whose origin is the temple and whose insertion is the jaw.

== Etymology ==
The word "temple" as used in anatomy has a separate etymology from the other meaning of word temple, meaning "place of worship". Both come from Latin, but the word for the place of worship comes from templum, whereas the word for the part of the head comes from Vulgar Latin *tempula, modified from tempora, plural form ("both temples") of tempus, a word that refers both to "time" and to this part of the head. Due to its shared spelling (but not shared source) with the word for time, the adjective for both is "temporal" (both "pertaining to time" and "pertaining to the anatomical temple").

The name of the temporalis muscle looks like a form of the Latin word "tempus" meaning "time", but this is a coincidence and the two words do not come from the same root.

== See also ==
- Pterion, the weakest part of the skull
