= Superior auricular ligament =

Ligament of the ear

Details
- From: helix
- To: external auditory meatus

Identifiers
- Latin: ligamentum auriculare superius

The superior auricular ligament crosses from the spine of the helix to the superior margin of the external auditory meatus.
