= Superficial temporal artery =

Major artery of the head

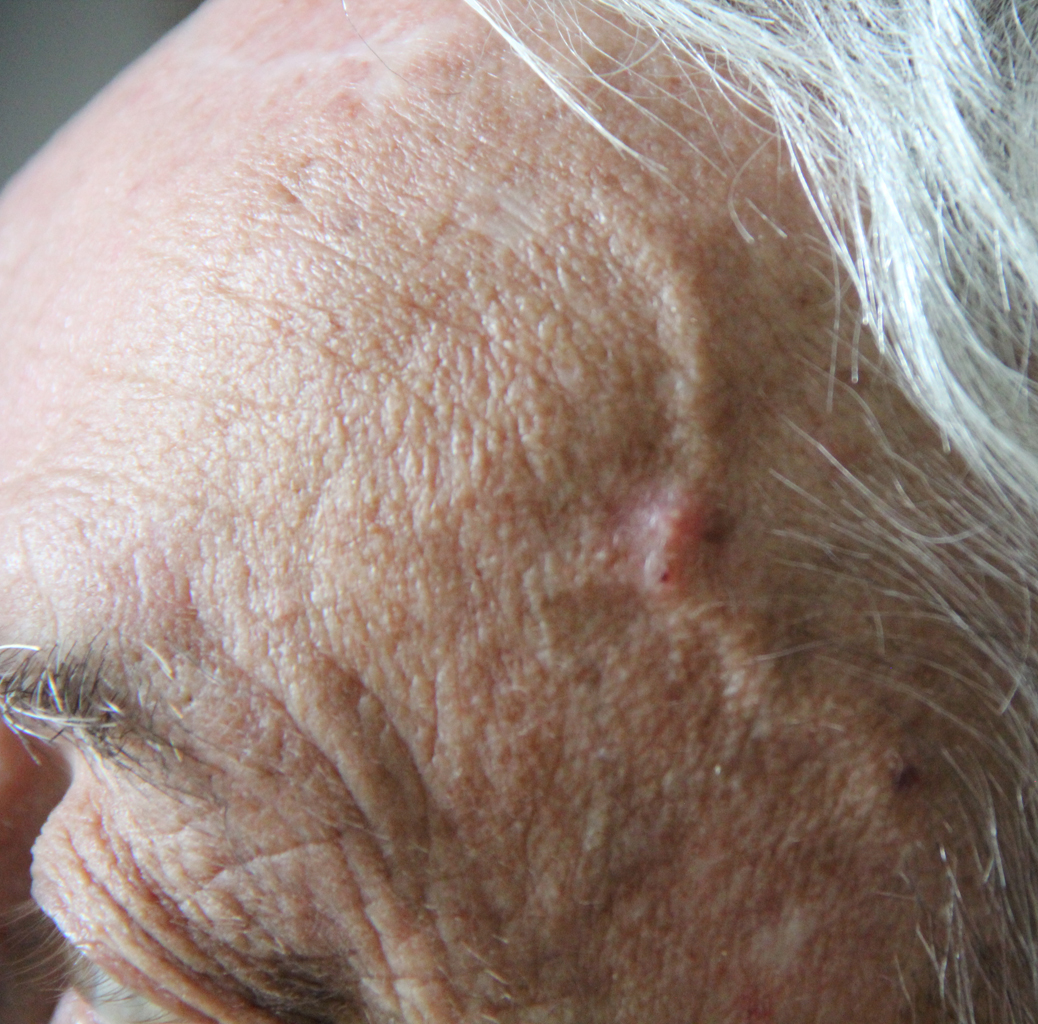
- Frontal branch of the superficial temporal artery

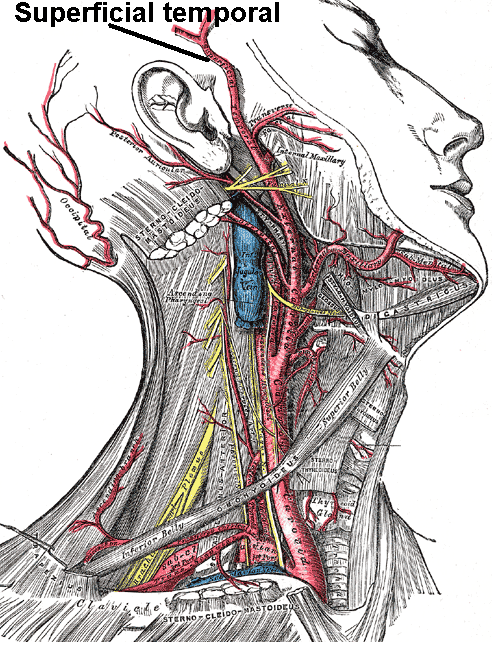
- Superficial dissection of the right side of the neck, showing the carotid and subclavian arteries.

Details
- Source: External carotid artery
- Branches: Transverse facial artery Middle temporal artery Anterior auricular branch frontal branch parietal branch
- Vein: Superficial temporal vein
- Supplies: Temple, scalp

Identifiers
- Latin: arteria temporalis superficialis
- TA98: A12.2.05.045
- TA2: 4413
- FMA: 49650

In human anatomy, the superficial temporal artery is a major artery of the head. It arises from the external carotid artery when it splits into the superficial temporal artery and maxillary artery.

Its pulse can be felt above the zygomatic arch, above and in front of the tragus of the ear.

== Structure ==
The superficial temporal artery is the smaller of two end branches that split superiorly from the external carotid. Based on its direction, the superficial temporal artery appears to be a continuation of the external carotid.

It begins within the parotid gland, behind the neck of the mandible, and passes superficially over the posterior root of the zygomatic process of the temporal bone; about 5 cm above this process it divides into two branches: a. frontal, and a. parietal.

=== Branches ===
The parietal branch of the superficial temporal artery (posterior temporal) is a small artery in the head. It is larger than the frontal branch and curves upward and backward on the side of the head, lying superficial to the temporal fascia; it joins with its fellow of the opposite side, and with the posterior auricular and occipital arteries.

The frontal branch of the superficial temporal artery (anterior temporal) runs tortuously upward and forward to the forehead, supplying the muscles, skin, and pericranium in this region, and anastomosing with the supraorbital and frontal arteries. In an estimate of the path of the nerve in the soft tissue of the temporal frontal branch using landmarks by Pitanguy, he describes a line starting from a point 0.5 cm below the tragus in the direction of the eyebrow, passing 1.5 cm above the lateral extremity of the eyebrow.

=== Relations ===
As it crosses the zygomatic process, it is covered by the auricularis anterior muscle and by a dense fascia; it is crossed by the temporal and zygomatic branches of the facial nerve and one or two veins, and is accompanied by the auriculotemporal nerve, which lies immediately behind it.

The superficial temporal artery joins (anastomoses) with, among others, the supraorbital artery of the internal carotid artery.

== Clinical significance ==
The superficial temporal artery is often affected in giant-cell arteritis and biopsied if the diagnosis is suspected.

== Additional images ==
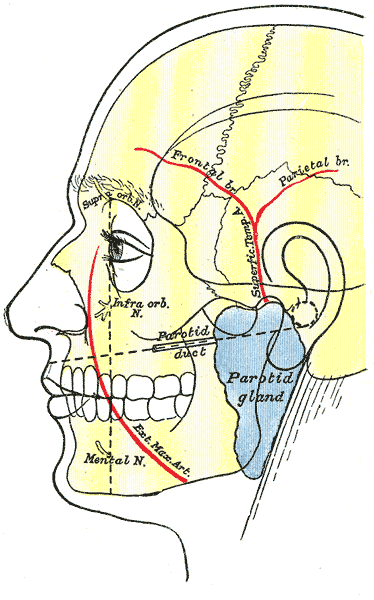
Outline of side of face, showing chief surface markings. (Superficial temporal a. visible at center, to left of ear.)

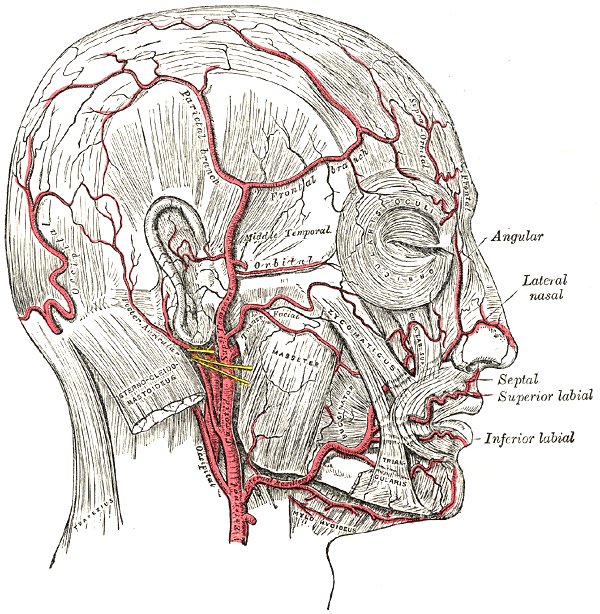
The arteries of the face and scalp
(frontal branch labeled at upper right)

== See also ==
Extracranial-intracranial bypass
