= Superficial temporal vein =

Blood vessel of the head

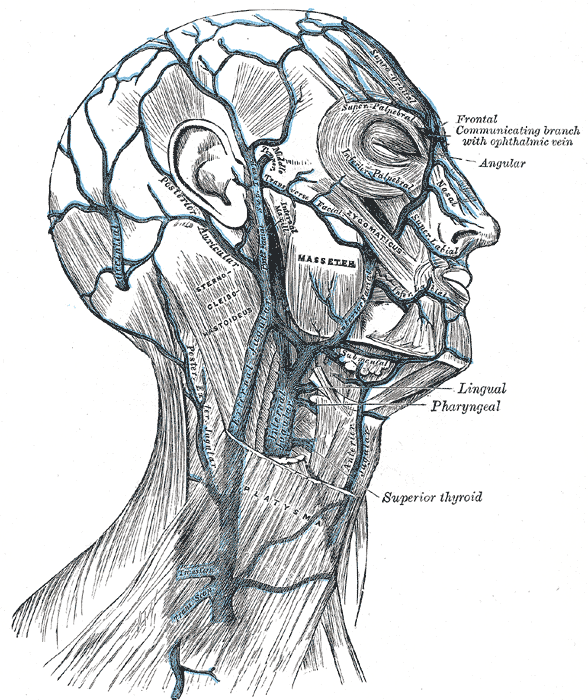
- Veins of the head and neck. ("Sup. Temp." labeled at center, anterior to the ear.)

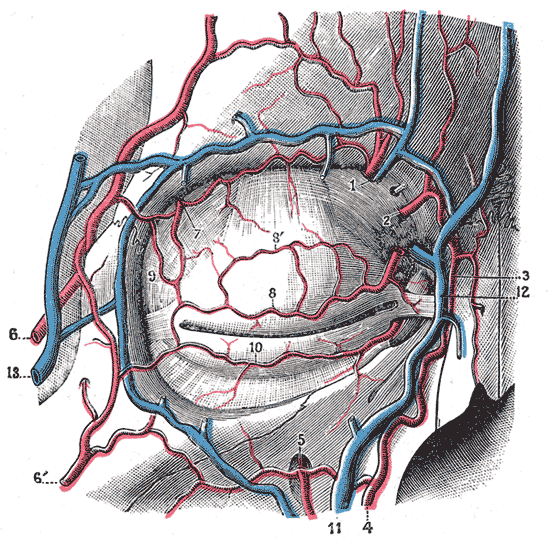
- Bloodvessels of the eyelids, front view. (13, at left, is branch of the superficial temporal vein.)

Details
- Drains from: Temple, scalp
- Drains to: Retromandibular vein
- Artery: Superficial temporal artery

Identifiers
- Latin: venae temporales superficiales
- TA98: A12.3.05.032
- TA2: 4832
- FMA: 70849

The superficial temporal vein is a vein of the side of the head which collects venous blood from the region of the temple. It arises from an anastomosing venous plexus on the side and top of the head. The superficial temporal vein terminates within the substance of the parotid gland by uniting with the maxillary vein to form the retromandibular vein.

== Structure ==
It begins on the side and vertex of the skull in a network (plexus) which communicates with the frontal vein and supraorbital vein, with the corresponding vein of the opposite side, and with the posterior auricular vein and occipital vein.

From this network frontal and parietal branches arise, and join above the zygomatic arch to form the trunk of the vein, which is joined by the middle temporal vein emerging from the temporalis muscle.

It then crosses the posterior root of the zygomatic arch, enters the substance of the parotid gland where it unites with the internal maxillary vein to form the posterior facial vein.

=== Tributaries ===
Tributaries of the superficial temporal vein drain venous blood from the temple.

Tributaries of the superficial temporal vein include:

- some parotid veins
- articular veins of the temporomandibular joint
- anterior auricular veins from the auricula
- the transverse facial vein from the side of the face
