= Posterior auricular vein =

Vein of the head

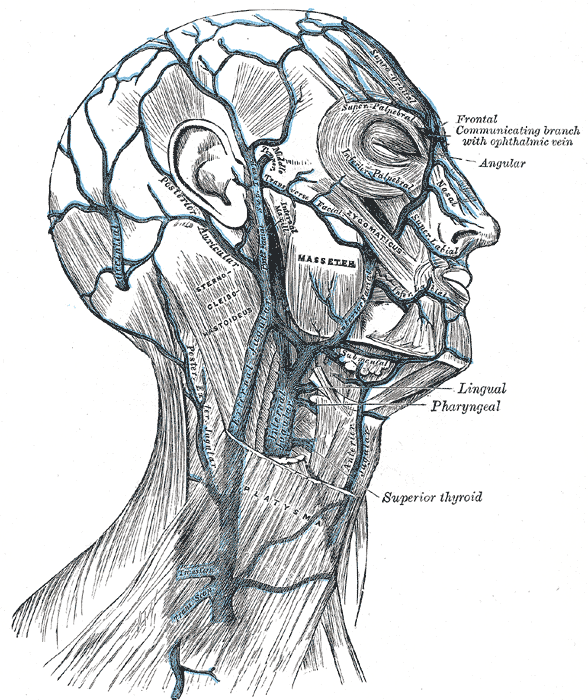
- Veins of the head and neck. (Posterior auricular visible behind ear.)

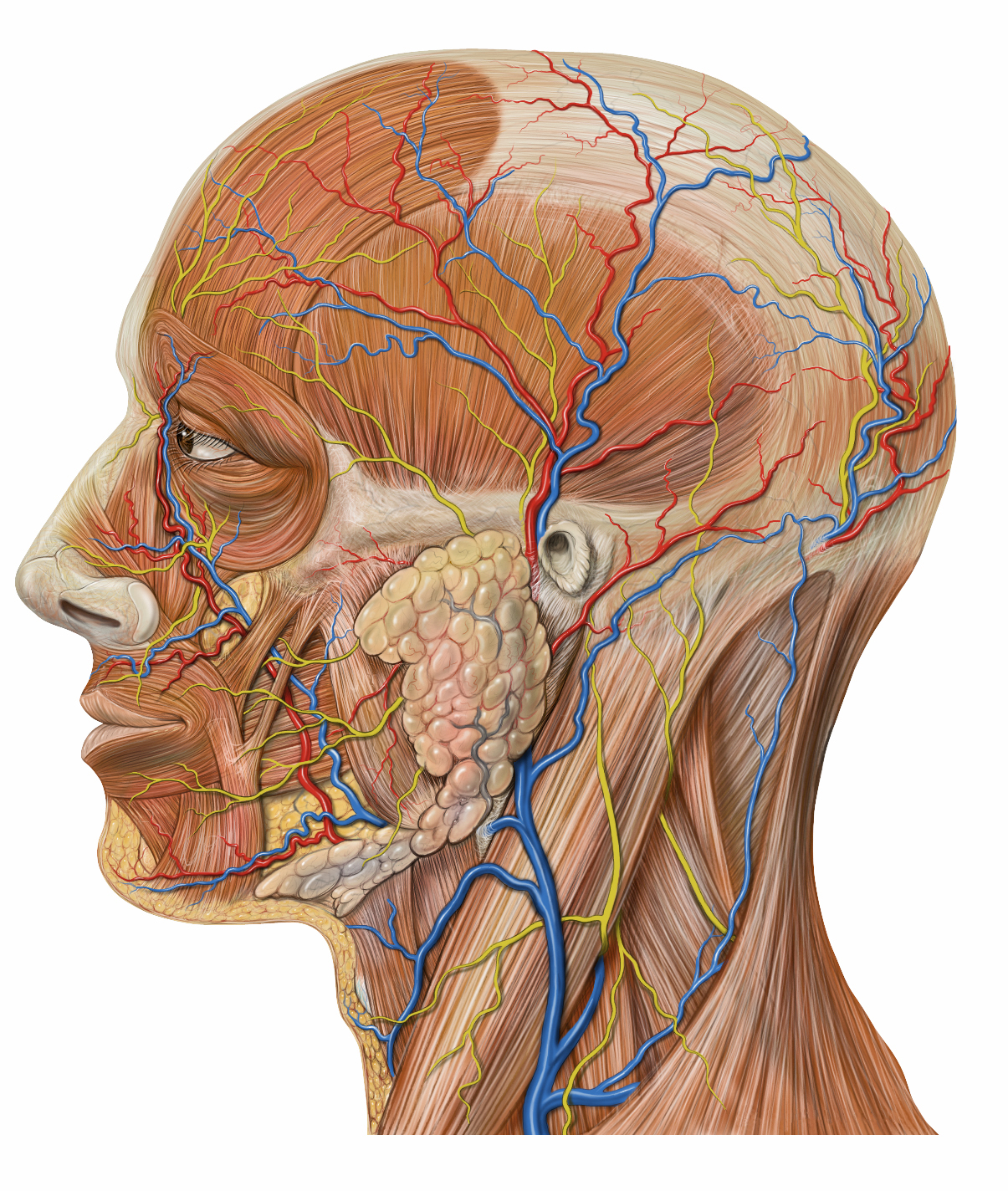
- Lateral head anatomy detail

Details
- Drains from: Scalp
- Drains to: External jugular vein
- Artery: Posterior auricular artery

Identifiers
- Latin: vena auricularis posterior
- TA98: A12.3.05.046
- TA2: 4958
- FMA: 50851

The posterior auricular vein is a vein of the head. It begins from a plexus with the occipital vein and the superficial temporal vein, descends behind the auricle, and drains into the external jugular vein.

== Structure ==
The posterior auricular vein begins upon the side of the head, in a plexus which communicates with the tributaries of the occipital vein and the superficial temporal vein. It descends behind the auricle. It joins the posterior division of the retromandibular vein. It drains into the external jugular vein.

It receive the stylomastoid vein, and some tributaries from the cranial surface of the auricle.

=== Variation ===
The posterior auricular vein may drain into the internal jugular vein or a posterior jugular vein if there are variations in the external jugular vein.

== Clinical significance ==
Skin from the auriculomastoid region of the head may be grafted as a flap, keeping the posterior auricular vein with it.
