= List of veins of the human body =

A list of veins in the human body:

  - Veins of the heart
    - Coronary sinus
      - Great cardiac vein
      - Oblique vein of left atrium
      - Middle cardiac vein
      - Small cardiac vein
  - Pulmonary veins
  - Superior vena cava
    - Brachiocephalic vein
      - Inferior thyroid vein
      - Inferior laryngeal vein
      - Pericardial veins
      - Pericardiophrenic veins
      - Bronchial veins
      - Vertebral vein
        - Occipital vein
        - Anterior vertebral vein
      - Deep cervical vein
      - Internal thoracic veins
        - Superior epigastric veins
        - Musculophrenic veins
        - Anterior intercostal veins
      - Supreme intercostal vein
    - Internal jugular vein
      - Lingual vein
        - Dorsal lingual veins
        - Sublingual vein
        - Deep lingual vein
      - Superior thyroid vein
      - Middle thyroid veins
      - Sternocleidomastoid vein
      - Superior laryngeal vein
      - Facial vein
        - Angular vein
        - Supratrochlear veins
        - Supra-orbital vein
        - External nasal veins
        - Deep facial vein
        - External palatine vein
        - Submental vein
      - Retromandibular vein
        - Superficial temporal veins
        - Middle temporal vein
        - Transverse facial vein
        - Maxillary veins
        - Pterygoid plexus
      - External jugular vein
        - Posterior auricular vein
        - Anterior jugular vein
        - Suprascapular vein
        - Transverse cervical veins
      - Dural venous sinuses
        - Transverse sinus
        - Confluence of sinuses
        - Marginal sinus
        - Occipital sinus
        - Petrosquamous sinus
        - Sigmoid sinus
        - Superior sagittal sinus
        - Inferior sagittal sinus
        - Straight sinus
        - Inferior petrosal sinus
        - Superior petrosal sinus
        - Cavernous sinus
        - Sphenoparietal sinus
      - Diploic veins
      - Emissary veins
    - Cerebral veins
      - Superficial cerebral veins
      - Internal cerebral veins
        - Basal vein
        - Great cerebral vein
      - Veins of brainstem
      - Cerebellar veins
    - Orbital veins
      - Superior ophthalmic vein
        - Nasofrontal vein
        - Ethmoidal veins
        - Lacrimal vein
        - Vorticose veins
        - Ciliary veins
        - Central retinal vein
        - Episcleral vein
      - Inferior ophthalmic vein
    - Azygos vein
      - Posterior intercostal veins
        - Intervertebral vein
      - Veins of vertebral column
        - Anterior internal vertebral venous plexus
          - Basivertebral veins
          - Anterior spinal veins
          - Posterior spinal veins
    - Veins of upper limb
      - Subclavian vein
      - Axillary vein
        - Subscapular vein
        - Circumflex scapular vein
          - Thoracodorsal vein
          - Posterior circumflex humeral vein
          - Anterior circumflex humeral vein
        - Lateral thoracic vein
      - Superficial veins of upper limb
        - Cephalic vein
        - Basilic vein
        - Median cubital vein
        - Dorsal venous network of hand
      - Deep veins of upper limb
        - Brachial veins
        - Ulnar veins
        - Radial veins
  - Inferior vena cava
    - Inferior phrenic veins
    - Lumbar veins
    - Ascending lumbar vein
    - Hepatic veins
    - Renal veins
      - Left suprarenal vein
      - Left ovarian vein
      - Left testicular vein
    - Right suprarenal vein
    - Right ovarian vein
    - Right testicular vein
      - Pampiniform plexus
    - Common iliac vein
      - Median sacral vein
      - Iliolumbar vein
    - Internal iliac vein
      - Superior gluteal veins
      - Inferior gluteal veins
      - Obturator veins
      - Lateral sacral veins
      - Vesical veins
      - Middle rectal veins
      - Internal pudendal vein
        - Deep veins of clitoris
        - Deep veins of penis
        - Inferior rectal veins
      - Posterior labial veins
      - Posterior scrotal veins
    - External iliac vein
      - Inferior epigastric vein
      - Deep circumflex iliac vein
    - Veins of lower limb
      - Superficial veins of lower limb
        - Great saphenous vein
          - External pudendal veins
        - Small saphenous vein
      - Deep veins of lower limb
        - Femoral vein
        - Profunda femoris vein
        - Popliteal vein
          - Sural veins
          - Anterior tibial veins
          - Posterior tibial veins
            - Fibular veins
  - Hepatic portal vein
    - Cystic vein
    - Para-umbilical veins
    - Left gastric vein
    - Right gastric vein
    - Superior mesenteric vein
      - Right gastro-omental vein
      - Ileocolic vein
        - Appendicular vein
      - Right colic vein
      - Middle colic vein
    - Splenic vein
      - Left gastro-omental vein
      - Inferior mesenteric vein
        - Left colic vein
        - Sigmoid veins
        - Superior rectal vein
