= Angular vein =

Vein of the face

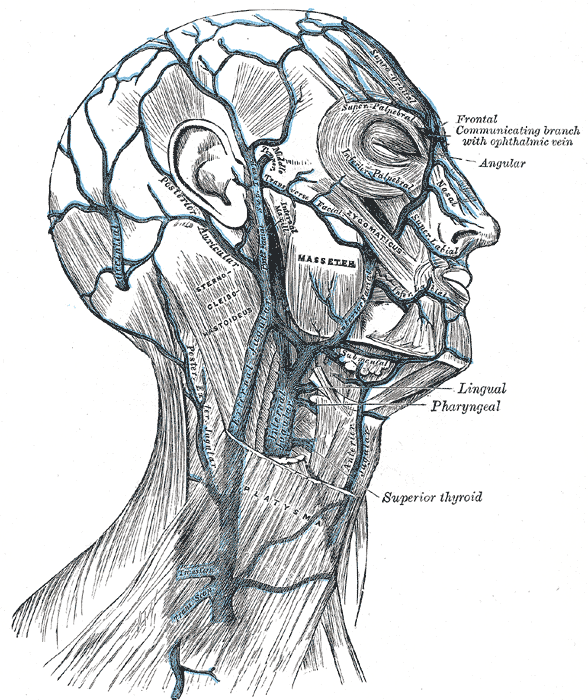
- Veins of the head and neck (angular visible at center right.)

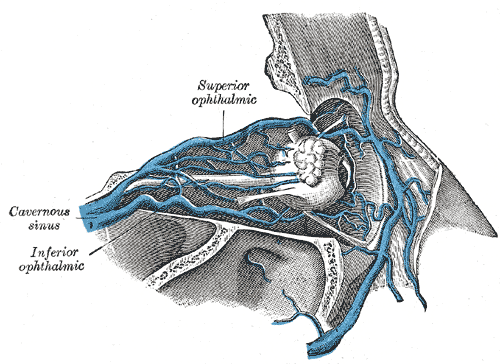
- Veins of orbit.

Details
- Source: Supraorbital vein
- Drains to: Facial vein
- Artery: Angular artery

Identifiers
- Latin: vena angularis
- TA98: A12.3.05.019
- TA2: 4818
- FMA: 50893

The angular vein is a vein of the face. It is the upper part of the facial vein, above its junction with the superior labial vein. It is formed by the junction of the supratrochlear vein and supraorbital vein, and joins with the superior labial vein. It drains the medial canthus, and parts of the nose and the upper lip. It can be a route of spread of infection from the danger triangle of the face to the cavernous sinus.

== Structure ==
The angular vein is the upper part of the facial vein, above its junction with the superior labial vein. It anastomoses with the supratrochlear vein, and the supraorbital vein. Its connection with the supraorbital vein forms the superior ophthalmic vein that drains through the orbit. This also connects it with the inferior ophthalmic vein and the cavernous sinus. These do not have valves. The angular vein itself may not contain valves. It receives the lateral nasal veins from the ala of the nose, and the inferior palpebral vein.

The angular vein lies lateral to the angular nerve. It runs obliquely downward by the side of the nose. It passes under zygomaticus major muscle. It joins with the superior labial vein.

== Function ==
The angular vein drains the medial canthus, and parts of the nose and the upper lip.

== Clinical significance ==
The angular vein may be affected by a thrombus. This can create problems for endovascular treatment.

=== Cavernous sinus thrombosis ===
Any infection of the mouth or face (such as the danger triangle of the face) can spread to the cavernous sinus via the angular veins. This is particularly as the veins are valveless. This can cause thrombosis. Squeezing pimples in this area should be avoided.

== Additional images ==
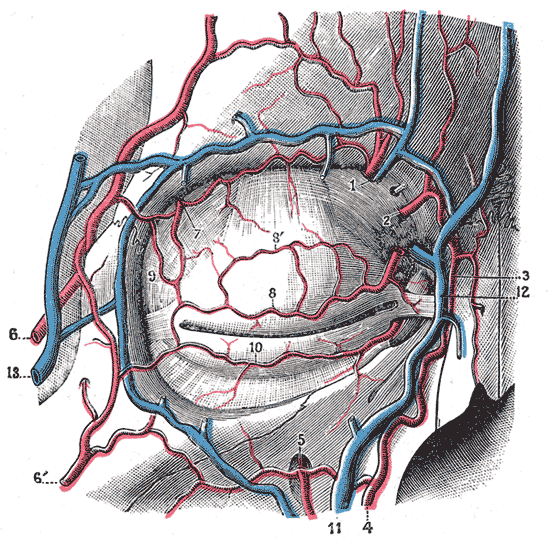
Bloodvessels of the eyelids, front view.

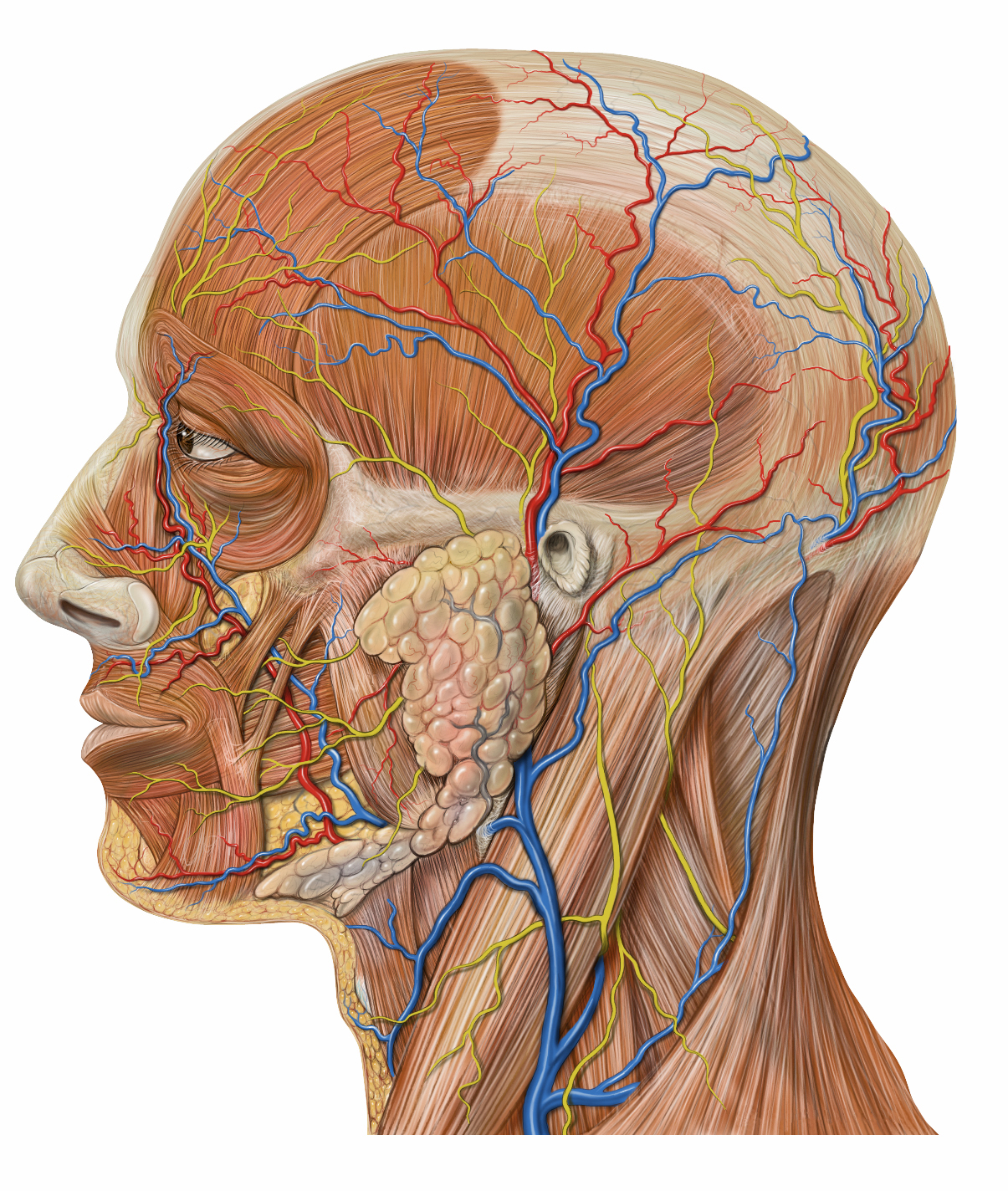
Lateral head anatomy detail

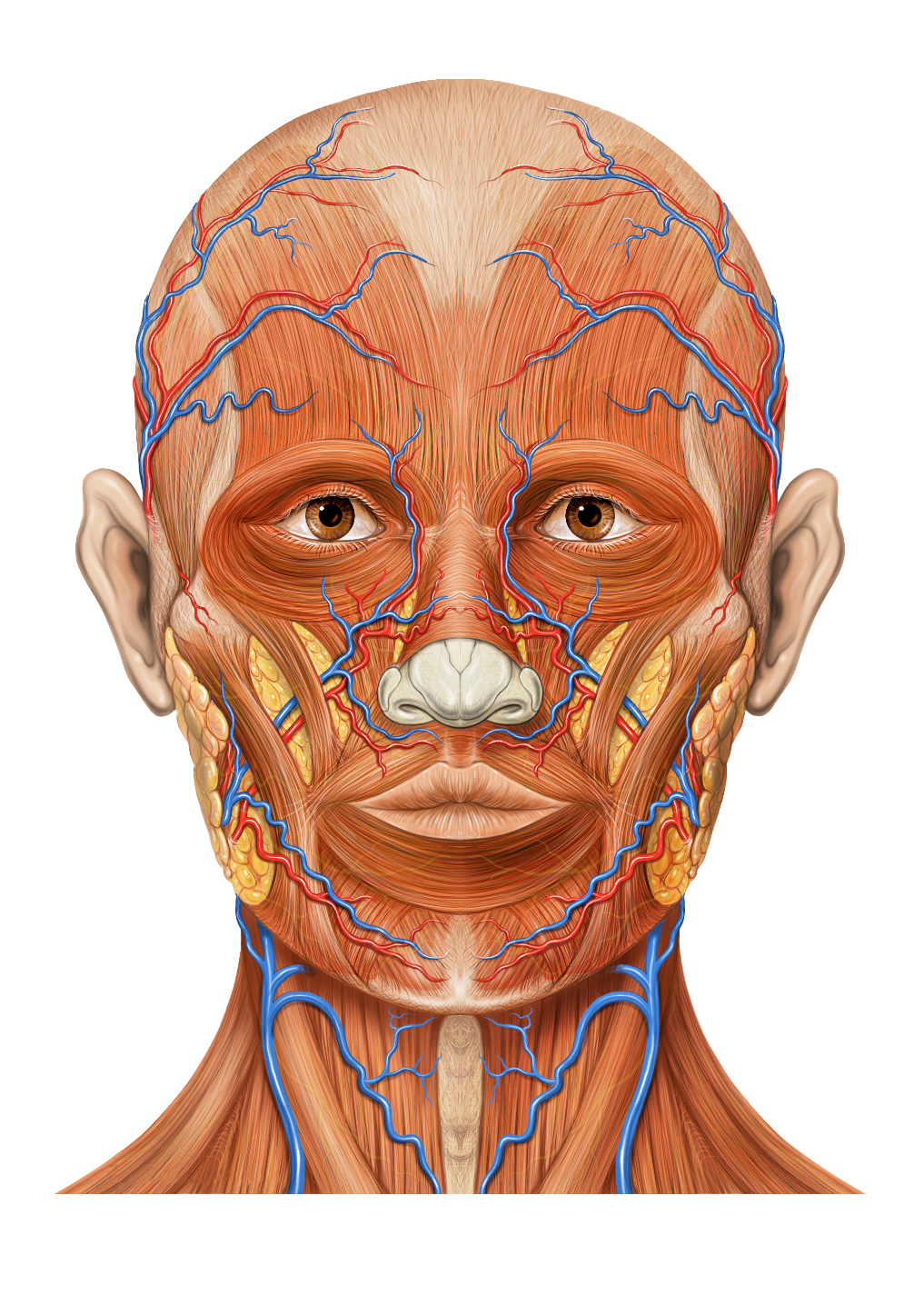
Head anatomy anterior view
