= Nasofrontal vein =

Vein in the orbit around the eye

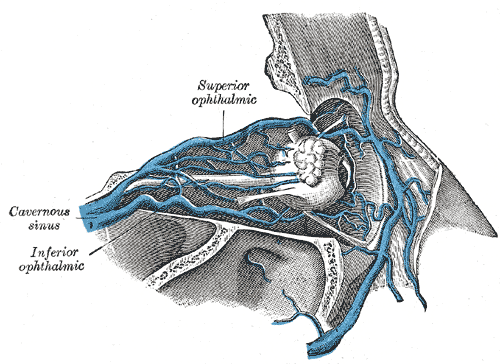
- Veins of orbit.

Details
- Drains to: Superior ophthalmic vein

Identifiers
- Latin: vena nasofrontalis
- TA98: A12.3.06.103
- TA2: 4888
- FMA: 51729

The nasofrontal vein is a vein in the orbit around the eye. It drains into the superior ophthalmic vein. It can be used for endovascular access to the cavernous sinus.

== Structure ==
The nasofrontal vein drains into the superior ophthalmic vein.

== Clinical significance ==
The nasofrontal vein can be used to access the superior ophthalmic vein and the cavernous sinus with endovascular tools.
