= Superior ophthalmic vein =

Vein of the orbit around the eye

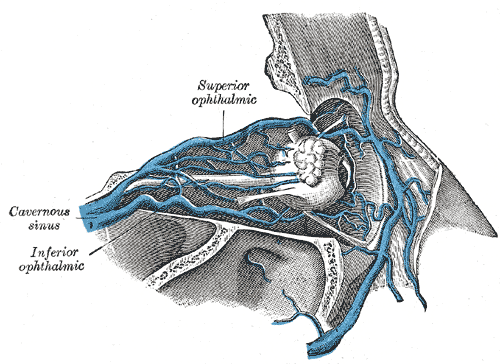
- Veins of orbit. (Superior ophthalmic labeled at top.)

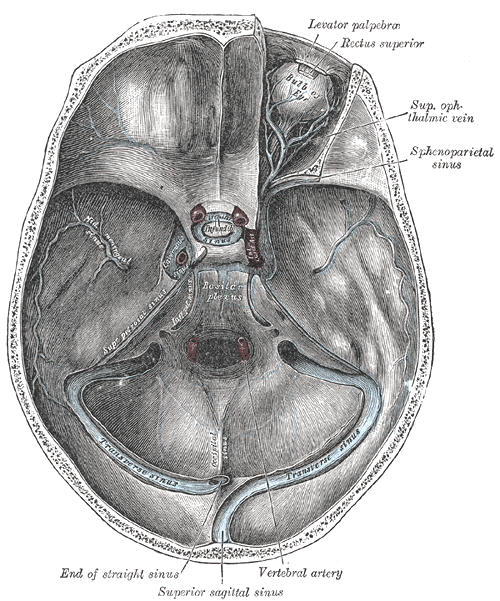
- The sinuses at the base of the skull. (Superior ophthalmic vein labeled at upper right.)

Details
- Source: Union of angular vein and supraorbital vein
- Drains to: Cavernous sinus
- Artery: Ophthalmic artery

Identifiers
- Latin: vena ophthalmica superior
- TA98: A12.3.06.102
- TA2: 4887
- FMA: 51246

The superior ophthalmic vein is a vein of the orbit that drains venous blood from structures of the upper orbit. It is formed by the union of the angular vein, and supraorbital vein. It passes backwards within the orbit alongside the ophthalmic artery, then exits the orbit through the superior orbital fissure to drain into the cavernous sinus.

The superior ophthalmic vein can be a path for the spread of infection from the danger triangle of the face to the cavernous sinus and the pterygoid plexus. It may also be affected by an arteriovenous fistula of the cavernous sinus.

== Structure ==
The superior ophthalmic vein - together with the inferior ophthalmic vein - represents the principal drainage system of the orbit (with the superior ophthalmic vein being the larger of the two). The superior ophthalmic vein drains venous blood from structures of the upper orbit. The superior ophthalmic vein forms/represents a connection between facial veins, and intracranial veins. It is valveless.

The superior ophthalmic vein is the largest and the most consistently present vein of the orbit. It usually measures 2-10 mm in diameter.

=== Origin ===
The superior ophthalmic vein is formed (depending upon the source) either by the union of the angular vein, and supraorbital vein, or by the union of two tributaries which connect anteriorly with the supraobrital vein, and the facial vein.

Its origin is situated within the orbit, near the superomedial orbital rim, posteromedial to the upper eyelid.

=== Course and relations ===
The superior ophthalmic vein is the only orbital vein whose course generally parallels the course of an orbital artery: it has a similar course as the ophthalmic artery (however, the latter instead exits the orbit through the optic canal).

Within the orbit, the superior ophthalmic vein passes posterior-ward alongside the ophthalmic artery. It passes inferior to the superior rectus muscle, running in between this muscle and the optic nerve. It runs across the optic nerve (CN II) to reach the superior portion of the superior orbital fissure through which it then exits the orbit to drain into the cavernous sinus. It usually passes superior to the common tendinous ring on its way out of the orbit.

=== Tributaries ===
Tributaries of the superior ophthalmic vein (may) include: the anterior ethmoidal vein and posterior ethmoidal vein, lacrimal vein, central retinal vein (sometimes), superior vorticose veins, medial palpebral veins, inferior ophthalmic vein (sometimes), and veins from the superior rectus muscle, superior oblique muscle, and medial rectus muscle.

The tributaries/territory drained by the superior ophthalmic vein is however somewhat variable.

Structures drained by the superior ophthalmic vein includes the frontal sinus.

=== Fate ===
The superior ophthalmic vein drains into the cavernous sinus.

== Clinical significance ==
=== Cavernous sinus thrombosis ===
The medial angle of the eye, nose and lips (known as the danger triangle of the face) usually drain through the facial vein, via the superior ophthalmic vein through the cavernous sinus. An infection of the face may spread to the cavernous sinus through the superior ophthalmic vein. This can cause cavernous sinus thrombosis. This can lead to damage of the nerves running through the cavernous sinus.

=== Arteriovenous fistula ===
When arteriovenous fistula affects the cavernous sinus, blood flow may occur backwards in the superior ophthalmic vein. This can cause exophthalmos. This may be treated by embolising the superior ophthalmic vein.

== See also ==
- Inferior ophthalmic vein
