= Pterygoid plexus =

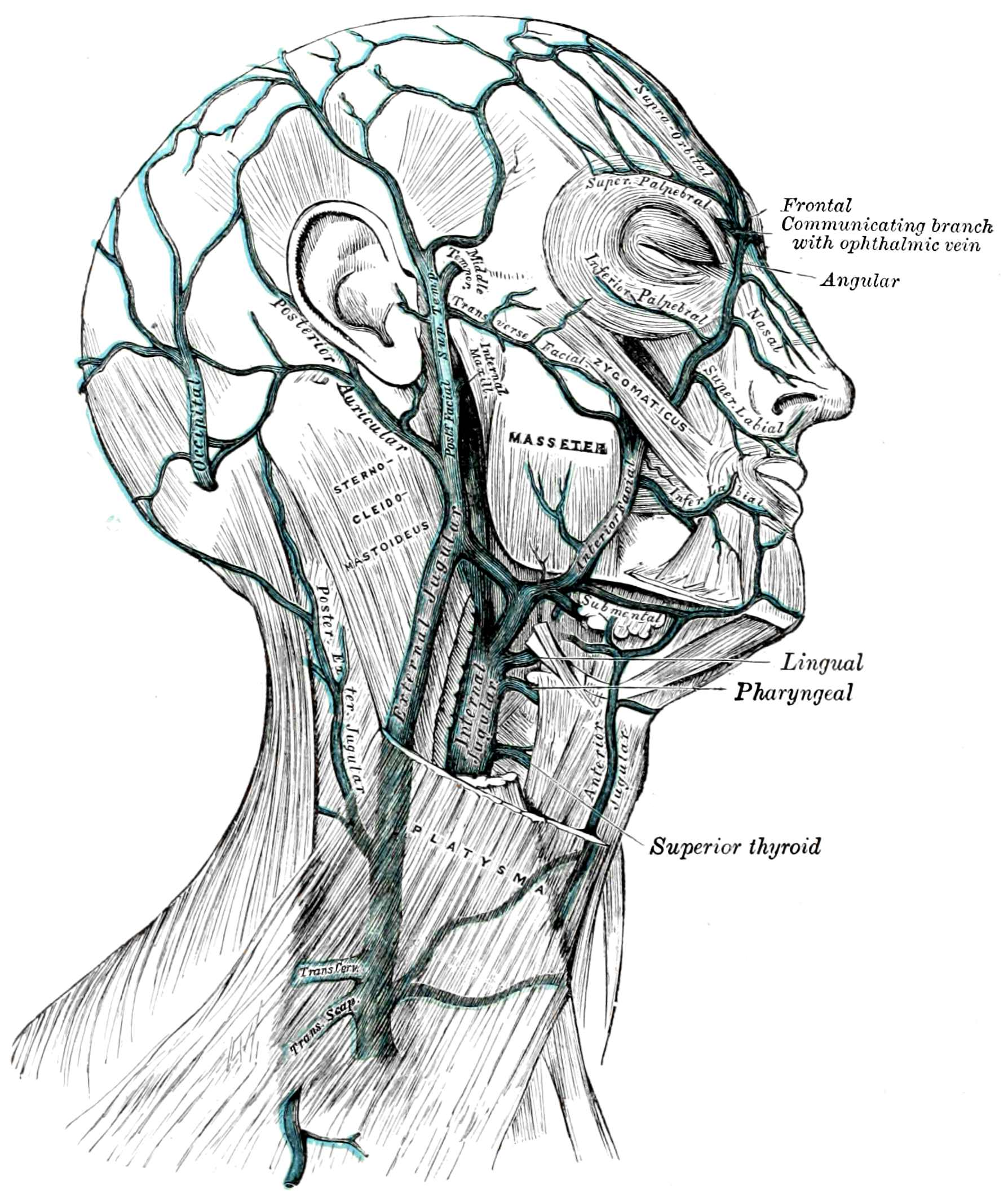
- Veins of the head and neck.

Details
- Drains to: Maxillary vein
- Artery: Maxillary artery

Identifiers
- Latin: plexus venosus pterygoideus, plexus pterygoideus
- TA98: A12.3.05.036
- TA2: 4836
- FMA: 50944

The pterygoid plexus (/ˈtɛrɪɡɔɪd/; from Greek pteryx, "wing" and eidos, "shape") is a fine venous plexus upon and within the lateral pterygoid muscle. It drains by a short maxillary vein.

== Anatomy ==
It is a venous plexus of considerable size, situated between the temporalis muscle and lateral pterygoid muscle, and partly between the two pterygoid muscles.

The plexus features venous valves. The contractions of the lateral pterygoid muscle promote venous drainage.

=== Tributaries ===
The plexus drains all veins that correspond to the branches of the maxillary artery (however, much of the blood delivered by the maxillary artery is returned by other routes), as well as two additional veins.

It receives the following veins:

- sphenopalatine
- middle meningeal
- deep temporal (anterior & posterior)
- pterygoid
- masseteric
- buccinator
- alveolar
- some palatine veins (palatine vein which divides into the greater and lesser palatine v.)
- inferior ophthalmic vein
- deep facial vein
- infraorbital vein

=== Anastomoses ===
The plexus is connected with the intercranial cavernous sinus by emissary veins passing through the foramen ovale and foramen lacerum.

=== Relations ===
This plexus communicates freely with the anterior facial vein; it also communicates with the cavernous sinus, by branches through the foramen Vesalii, foramen ovale, and foramen lacerum. Due to its communication with the cavernous sinus, infection of the superficial face may spread to the cavernous sinus, causing cavernous sinus thrombosis. Complications may include edema of the eyelids, conjunctivae of the eyes, and subsequent paralysis of cranial nerves which course through the cavernous sinus.

The pterygoid plexus of veins becomes the maxillary vein. The maxillary vein and the superficial temporal vein later join to become the retromandibular vein. The posterior branch of the retromandibular vein and posterior auricular vein then form the external jugular vein, which empties into the subclavian vein.
