= Superior labial vein =

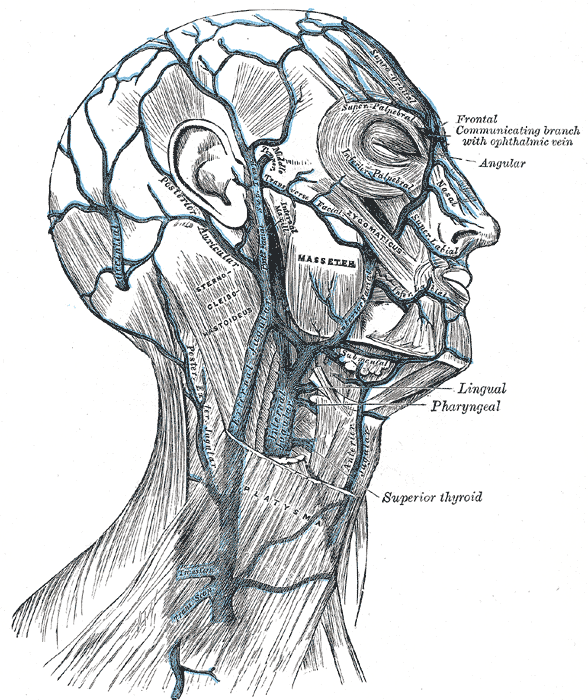
- Veins of the head and neck. (Superior labial vein visible at center right.)

Details
- Drains from: Upper lip
- Drains to: Facial vein
- Artery: Superior labial

Identifiers
- Latin: vena labialis superior
- TA98: A12.3.05.025
- TA2: 4824
- FMA: 52538

The superior labial vein is the vein receiving blood from the upper lip.

== Additional images ==
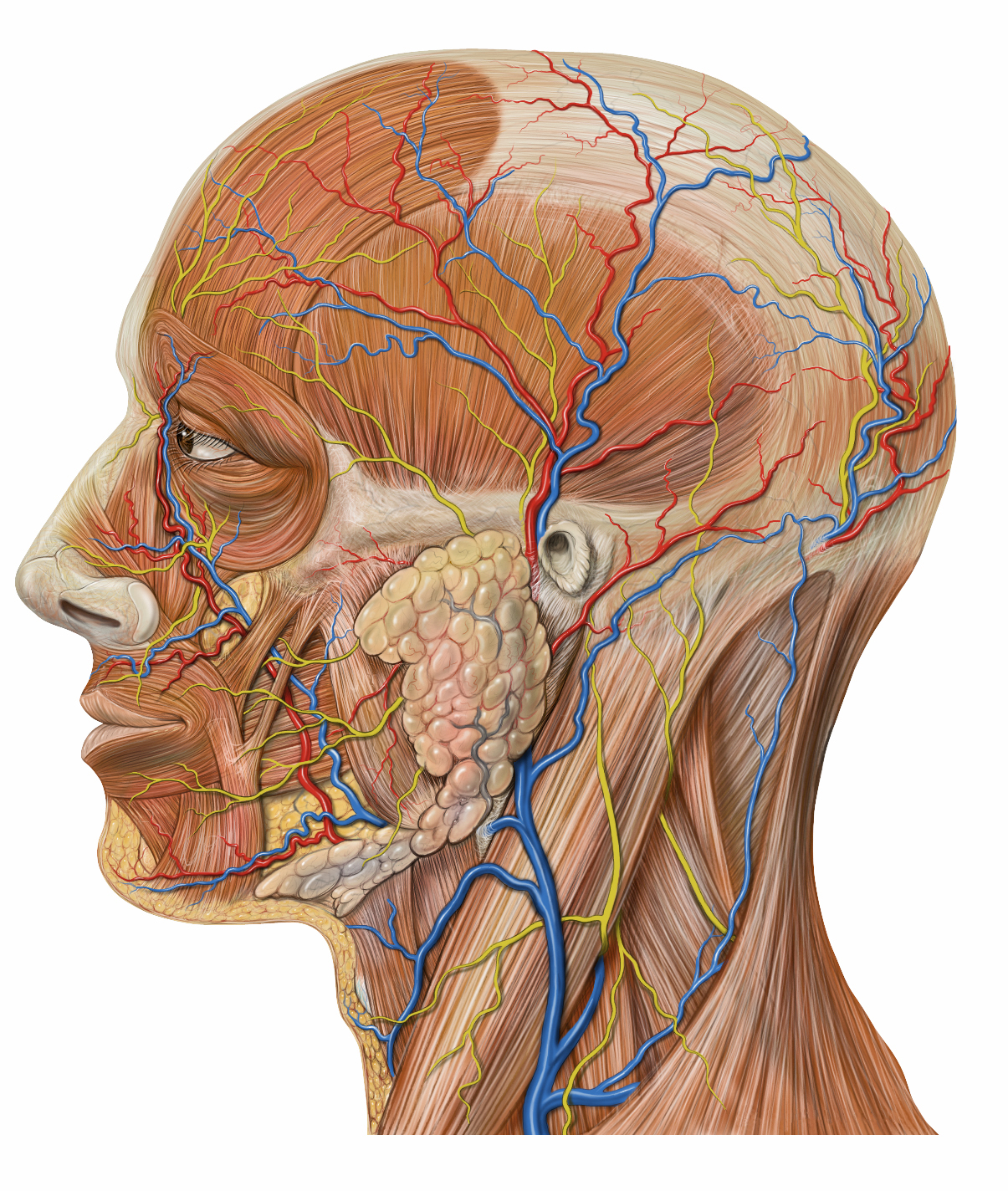
Lateral head anatomy detail

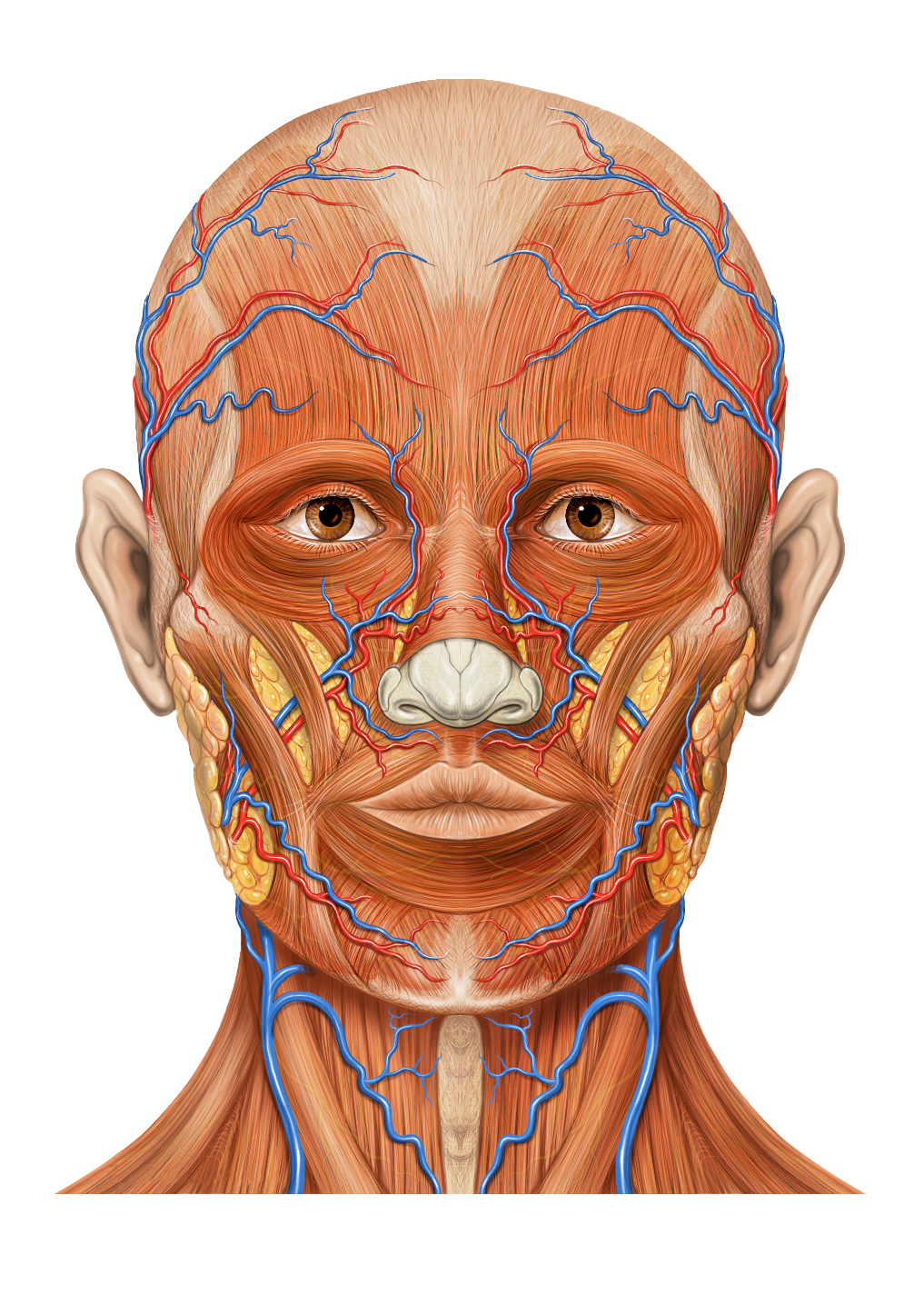
Head anatomy anterior view
