= Posterior external jugular vein =

Vein in the head and neck

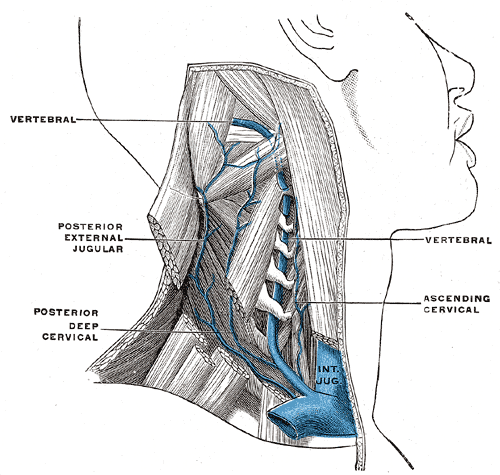
- The vertebral vein. (Posterior external jugular labeled at center left.)

Details

Identifiers
- Latin: vena jugularis posterior
- FMA: 14318

The posterior external jugular vein begins in the occipital region and returns the blood from the skin and superficial muscles in the upper and back part of the neck, lying between the splenius and trapezius.

It runs down the back part of the neck, and opens into the external jugular vein just below the middle of its course.

== See also ==
- jugular vein
