= Frontal vein =

Blood vessel of the head

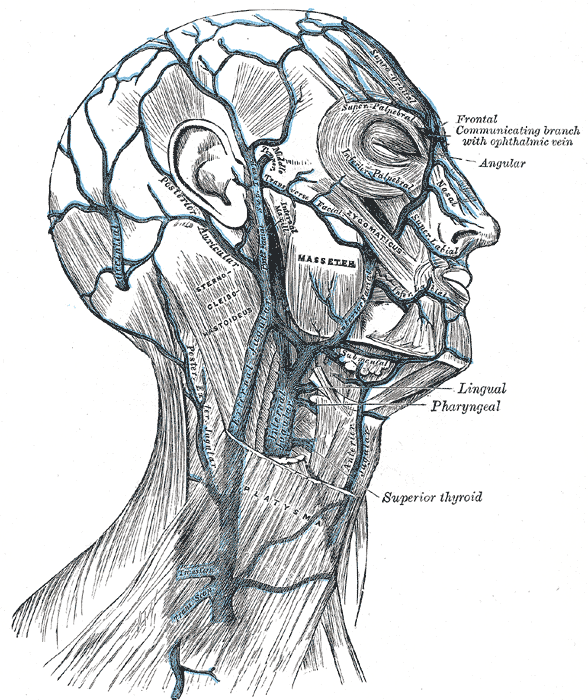
- Veins of the head and neck. (Frontal vein labeled at upper right.)

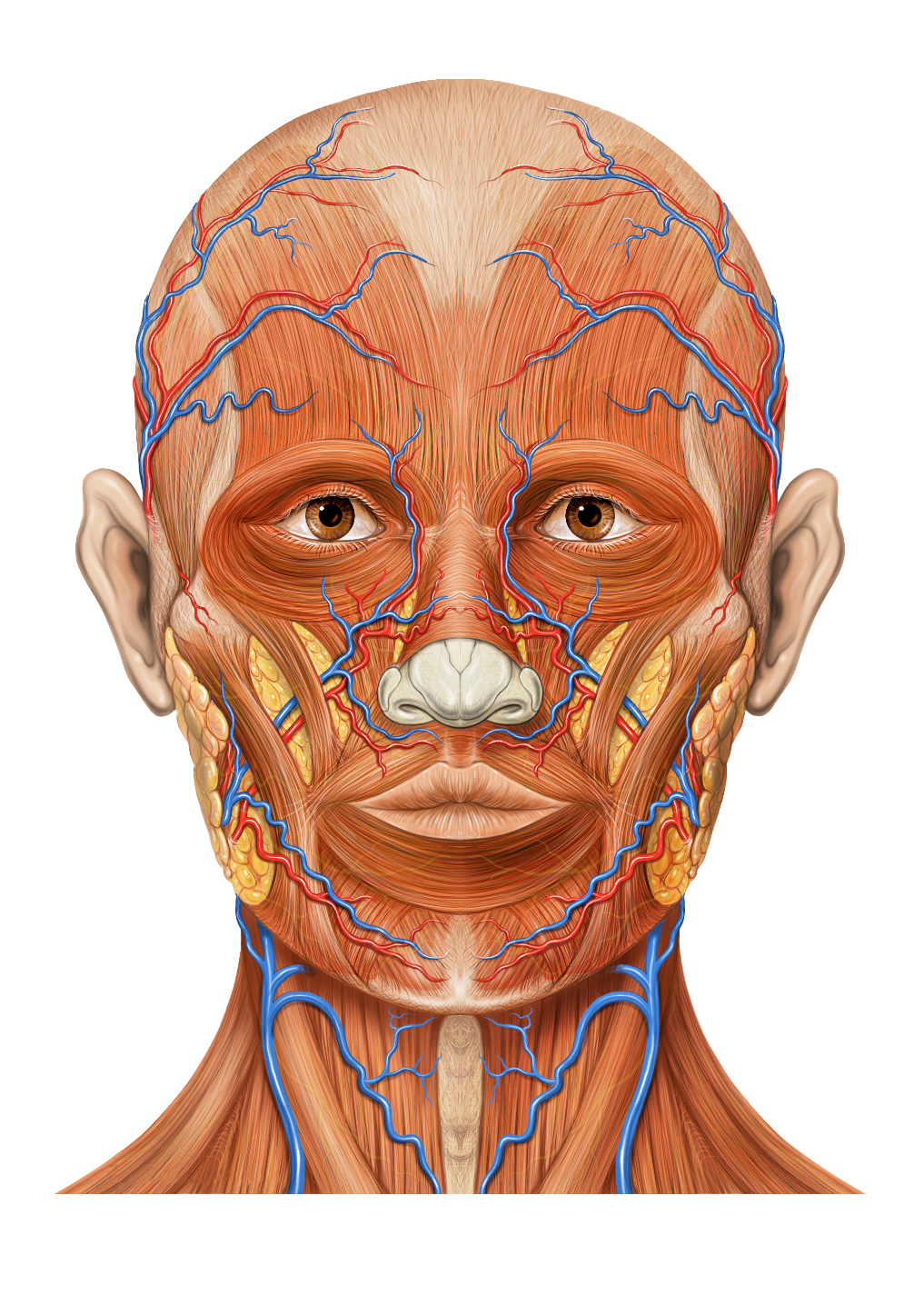
- Head anatomy anterior view

Details
- Artery: frontal branch of superficial temporal artery

Identifiers
- Latin: venae frontales
- TA98: A12.3.06.005
- TA2: 4905
- FMA: 51102

The frontal vein (supratrochlear vein) begins on the forehead in a venous plexus which communicates with the frontal branches of the superficial temporal vein. The veins converge to form a single trunk, which runs downward near the middle line of the forehead parallel with the vein of the opposite side. The two veins are joined, at the root of the nose, by a transverse branch, called the nasal arch, which receives some small veins from the dorsum of the nose. At the root of the nose the veins diverge, and, each at the medial angle of the orbit, joins the supraorbital vein, to form the angular vein. Occasionally the frontal veins join to form a single trunk, which bifurcates at the root of the nose into the two angular veins.

== See also ==
- Glabella
