= Retromandibular vein =

Major face vein

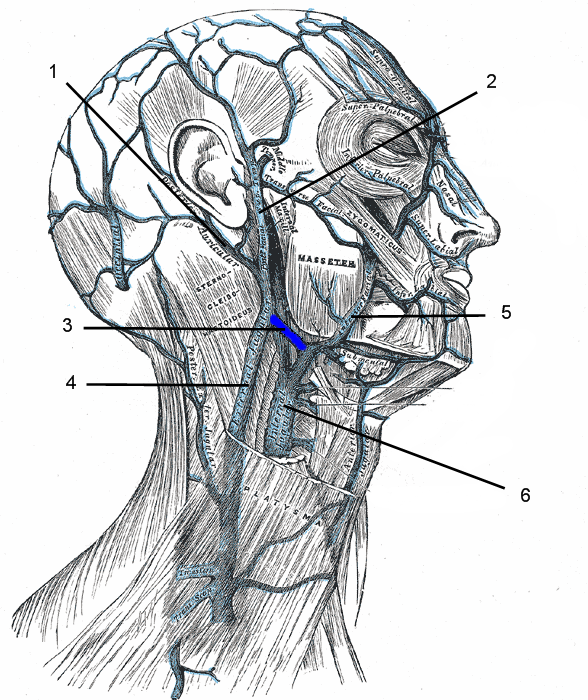
- Veins of the head and neck (retromandibular vein visible at center).

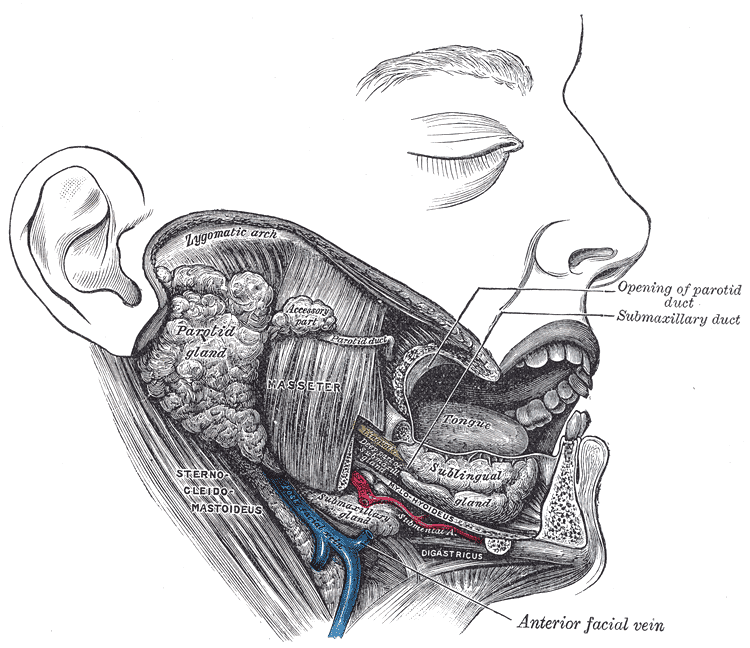
- Dissection, showing salivary glands of right side (retromandibular vein visible at bottom center).

Details
- Source: Superficial temporal vein, maxillary veins
- Drains to: External jugular vein
- Artery: Facial artery

Identifiers
- Latin: vena retromandibularis, vena facialis posterior
- TA98: A12.3.05.031
- TA2: 4831
- FMA: 50928

The retromandibular vein (temporomaxillary vein, posterior facial vein) is a major vein of the face. It is formed within the parotid gland by the confluence of the maxillary vein, and superficial temporal vein. It descends in the gland and splits into two branches upon emerging from the gland. Its anterior branch then joins the (anterior) facial vein forming the common facial vein, while its posterior branch joins the posterior auricular vein forming the external jugular vein.

== Anatomy ==
=== Origin ===
The retromandibular vein is formed within the parotid gland by the confluence of the maxillary vein, and superficial temporal vein.

=== Course ===
It descends inside parotid gland, superficial to the external carotid artery (but beneath the facial nerve), between the sternocleidomastoideus muscle and ramus of mandible. It emerges from the parotid gland inferiorly, then immediately divides into two branches:

- an anterior branch which passes anterior-ward to unite with the (anterior) facial vein forming the common facial vein (which then empties into the internal jugular vein).
- a posterior branch which penetrates the investing layer of the deep cervical fascia before uniting with the posterior auricular vein forming the external jugular vein.

== Function ==
The retromandibular vein provides venous drainage to the superior cranium, and significant drainage to the ear.

== Clinical significance ==
Parrot's sign is a sensation of pain when pressure is applied to the retromandibular region.

== Additional images ==
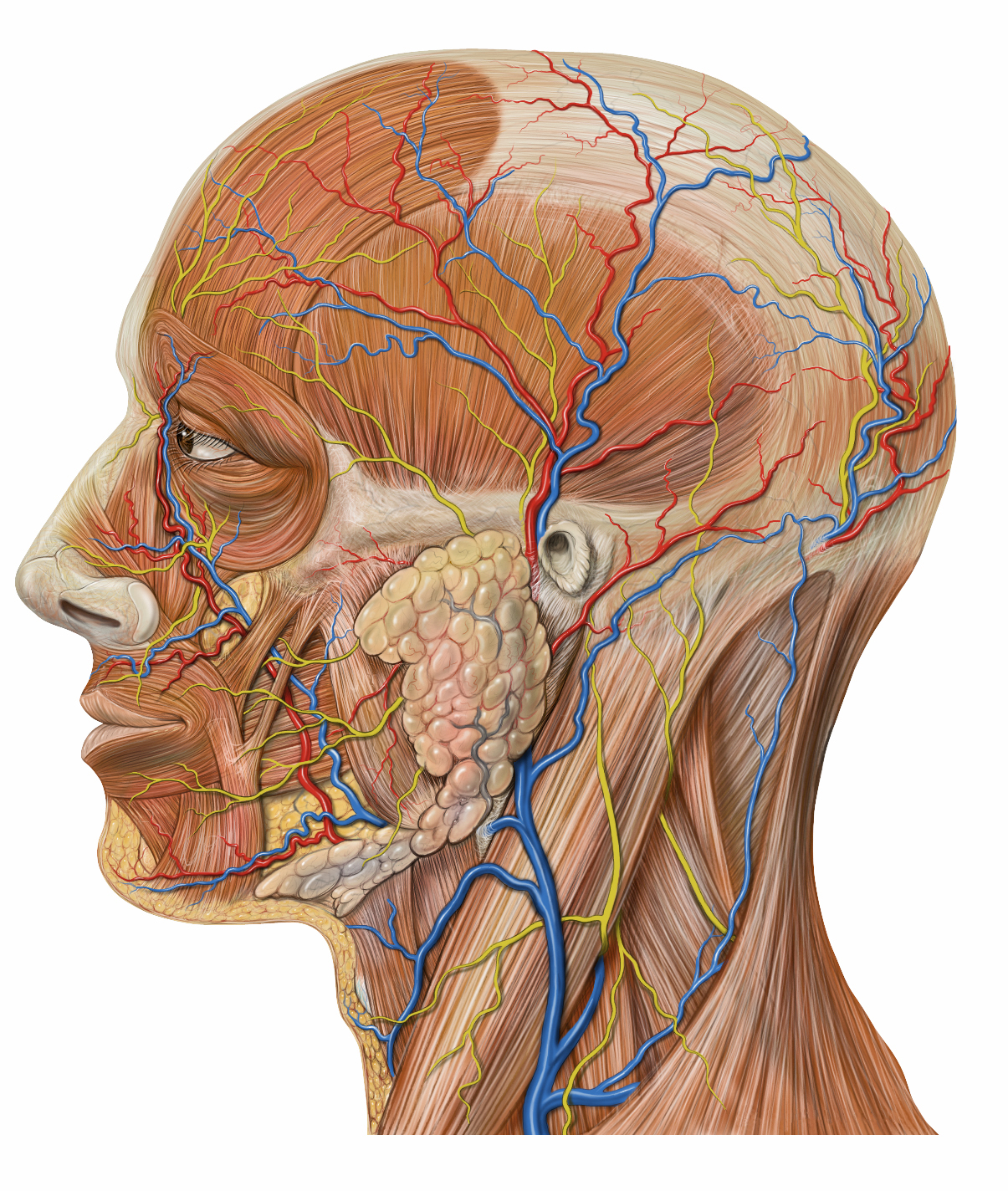
Lateral head anatomy detail
