= Deep facial vein =

Details
- Drains to: Facial vein

Identifiers
- Latin: vena profunda faciei
- TA98: A12.3.05.027
- TA2: 4826
- FMA: 50916

The anterior facial vein receives a branch of considerable size, the deep facial vein, from the pterygoid venous plexus.
