= Danger triangle of the face =

Area of the face with blood supply that connects indirectly to the brain

Danger triangle of the face (Nasolabial triangle)
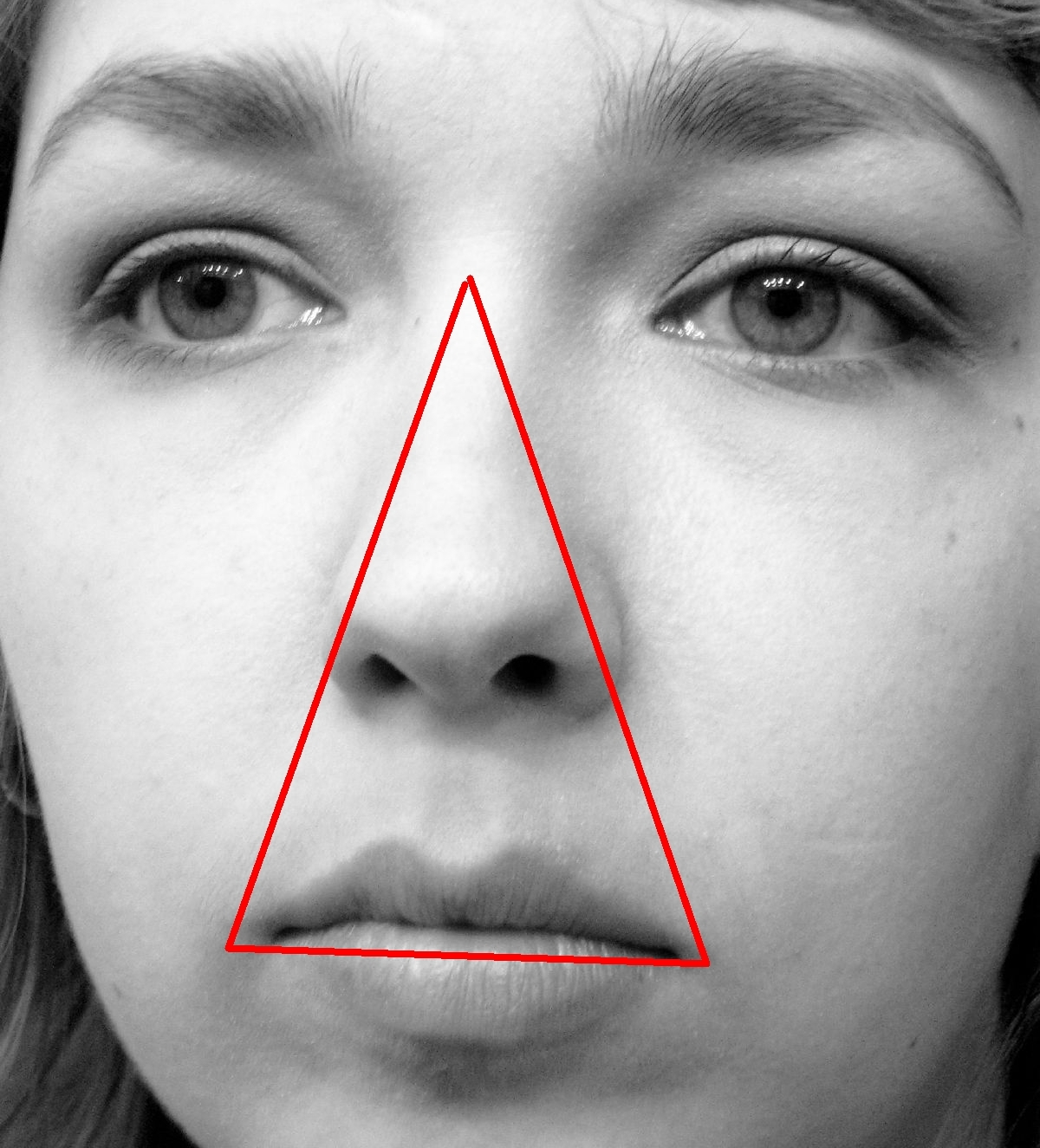
- The danger triangle of the area from the corners of the mouth to the bridge of the nose

The danger triangle of the face consists of the area from the corners of the mouth to the bridge of the nose, including the nose and maxilla. Due to the special nature of the blood supply to the human nose and surrounding area, it is possible for retrograde infection from the nasal area to spread to the brain, causing cavernous sinus thrombosis, meningitis, or brain abscess.

This is possible because of veinous communication (via the ophthalmic veins) between the facial vein and the cavernous sinus. The cavernous sinus lies within the cranial cavity, between layers of the meninges, and is a major conduit of venous drainage from the brain. Despite this relatively plausible anatomical argument, only severe facial infections (e.g., nasal abscess) can lead to a deeper central nervous system infection complication.

It was discovered that venous valves are present in the ophthalmic and facial veins. Thus, it is not the absence of venous valves but rather the existence of communications between the facial vein and cavernous sinus and the direction of blood flow that is important in the spread of infection from the face. Most people, but not all, have valves in these particular veins of the face.

The relationship between this area and a risk of cavernous sinus thrombosis was described as early as 1852. In 1937, a study found that 61% of the cases of cavernous sinus thrombosis were the result of boils on the upper part of the face. While the disorder has become extremely uncommon with the development of antibiotics, it still carries a very small chance to develop a high risk of death, and needs to be treated aggressively with antibiotics and blood thinners.

== Infection of cavernous sinus ==
If the cavernous sinus is infected, it can cause the blood within the sinus to clot, resulting in a cavernous sinus thrombosis. This affects the structures that are going through it or surround it. Inside the cavernous sinus, constriction of the following cranial nerves (CN) can be found: CN III (oculomotor nerve), CN IV (trochlear nerve), CN VI (abducens nerve), CN V (trigeminal nerve), specifically V1 (ophthalmic nerve) and V2 (maxillary nerve) branches. Failure of each of the nerves listed above will manifest in loss of function of the specific muscle, gland, or parasympathetic innervations (from CN III). In addition, it is possible that inflammation of the cavernous sinus will result in compression of the optic chiasm (resulting in vision problems) and/or the pituitary gland.

Failure of CN III will result in loss of function of the following muscles: medial rectus, superior rectus, inferior rectus, and inferior oblique, as well as muscles that are responsible for opening the eyelid: the levator palpebrae superioris muscle and the superior tarsal muscle (Müller's muscle). CN III damage also results in loss of parasympathetic innervation of the eye (loss of pupillary constriction and lens accommodation).
