= Maxillary vein =

Vein of the head

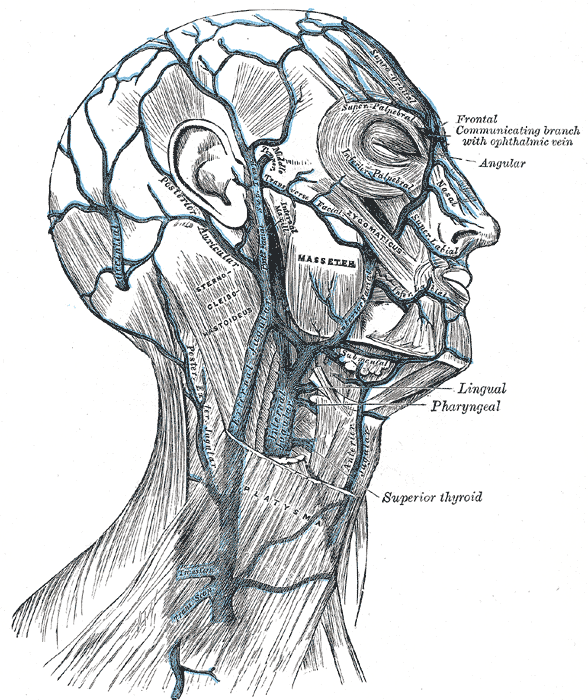
- Veins of the head and neck. (Internal maxillary vein visible at center.)

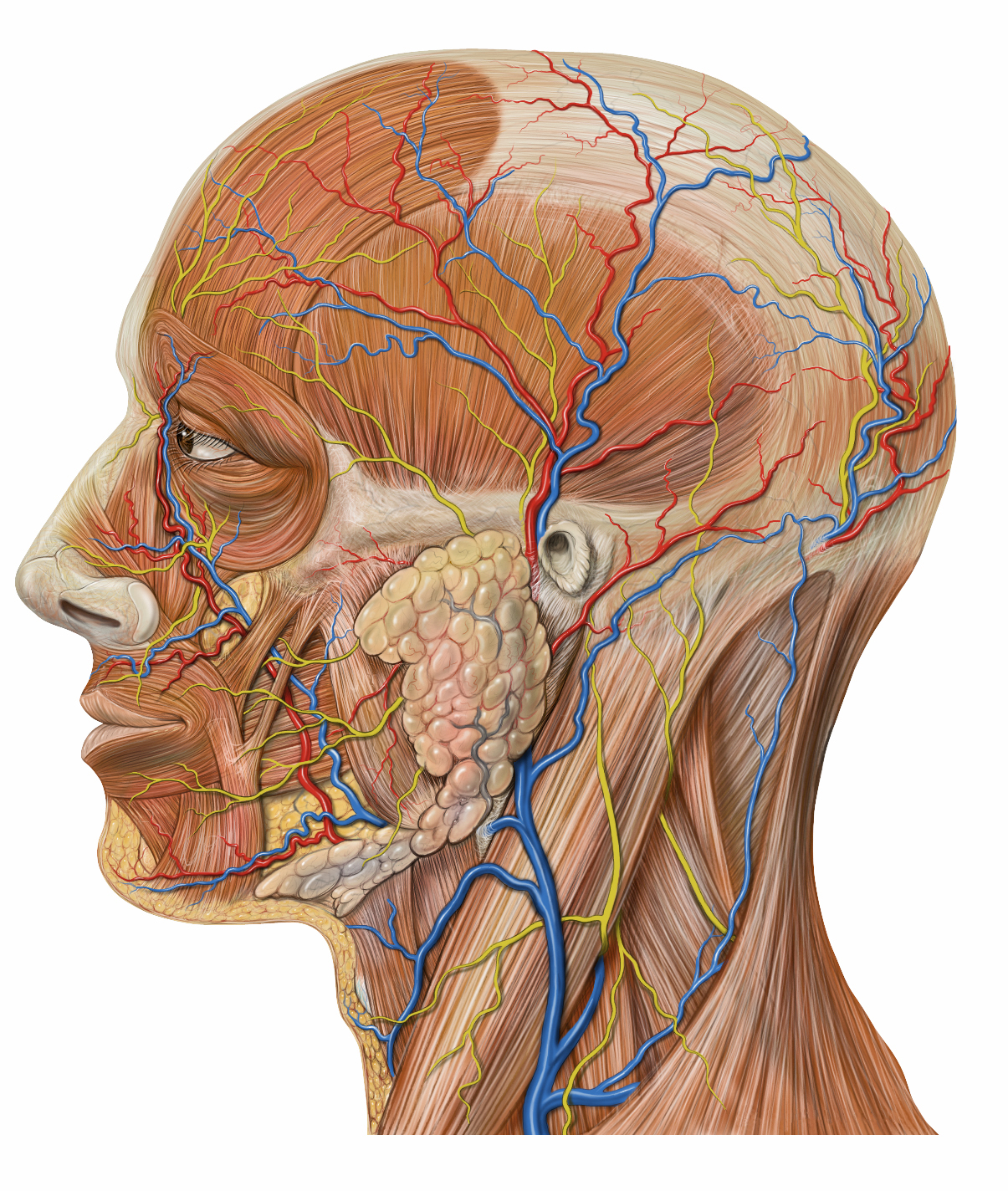
- Lateral head anatomy detail

Details
- Drains to: Retromandibular vein
- Artery: Maxillary artery

Identifiers
- Latin: vena maxillaris
- TA98: A12.3.05.035
- TA2: 4835
- FMA: 70850

The maxillary vein or internal maxillary vein is a vein of the head. It is a short trunk which accompanies (the first part of) the maxillary artery. It is formed by a confluence of the veins of the pterygoid plexus. It and passes posterior-ward between the sphenomandibular ligament and the neck of the mandible to enter the parotid gland where unites with the superficial temporal vein to form the retromandibular vein (posterior facial vein).

== Structure ==
=== Development ===
The maxillary vein may be the embryological origin of the central retinal vein.

== Additional images ==
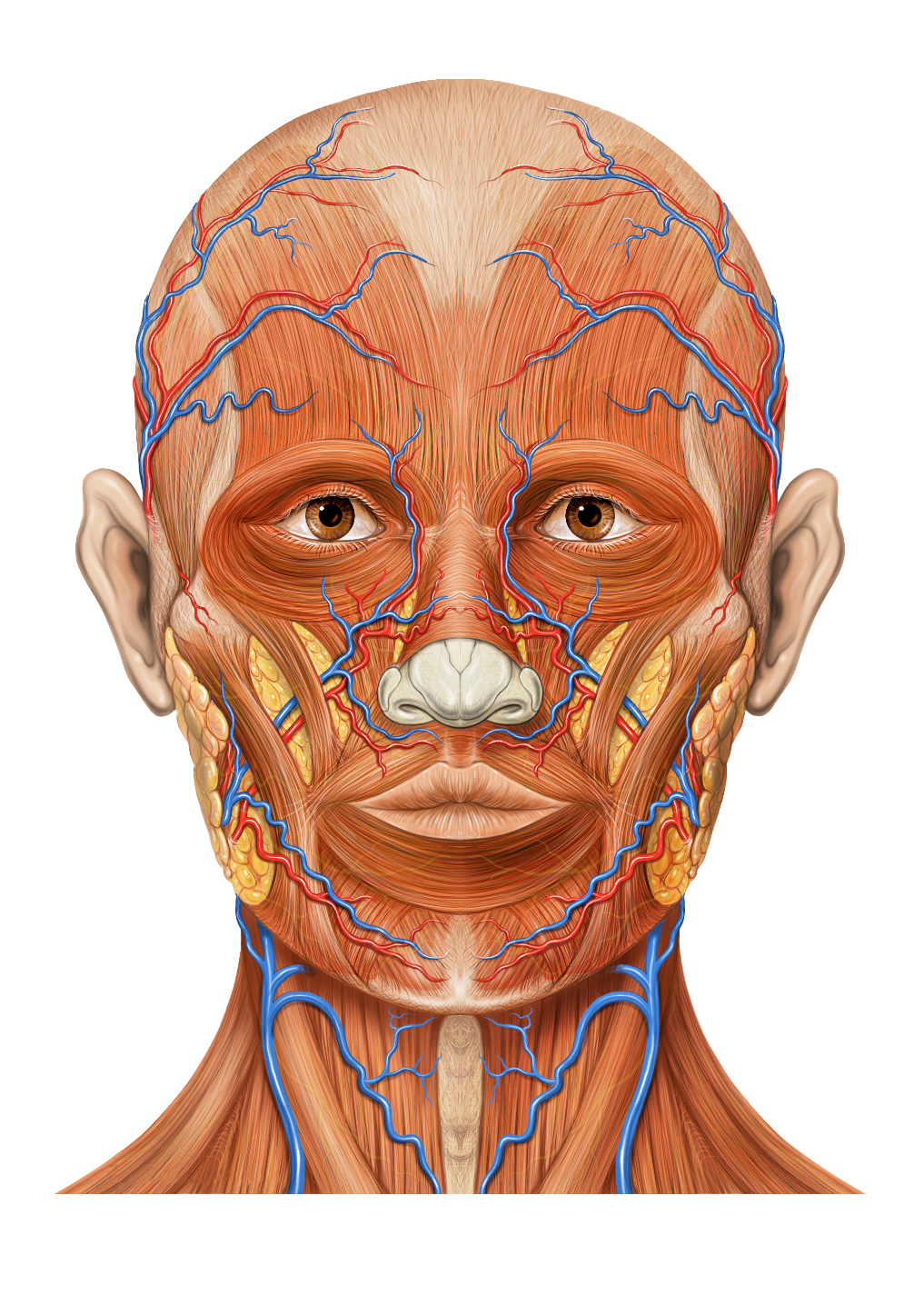
Head anatomy anterior view
