= Parrot's sign =

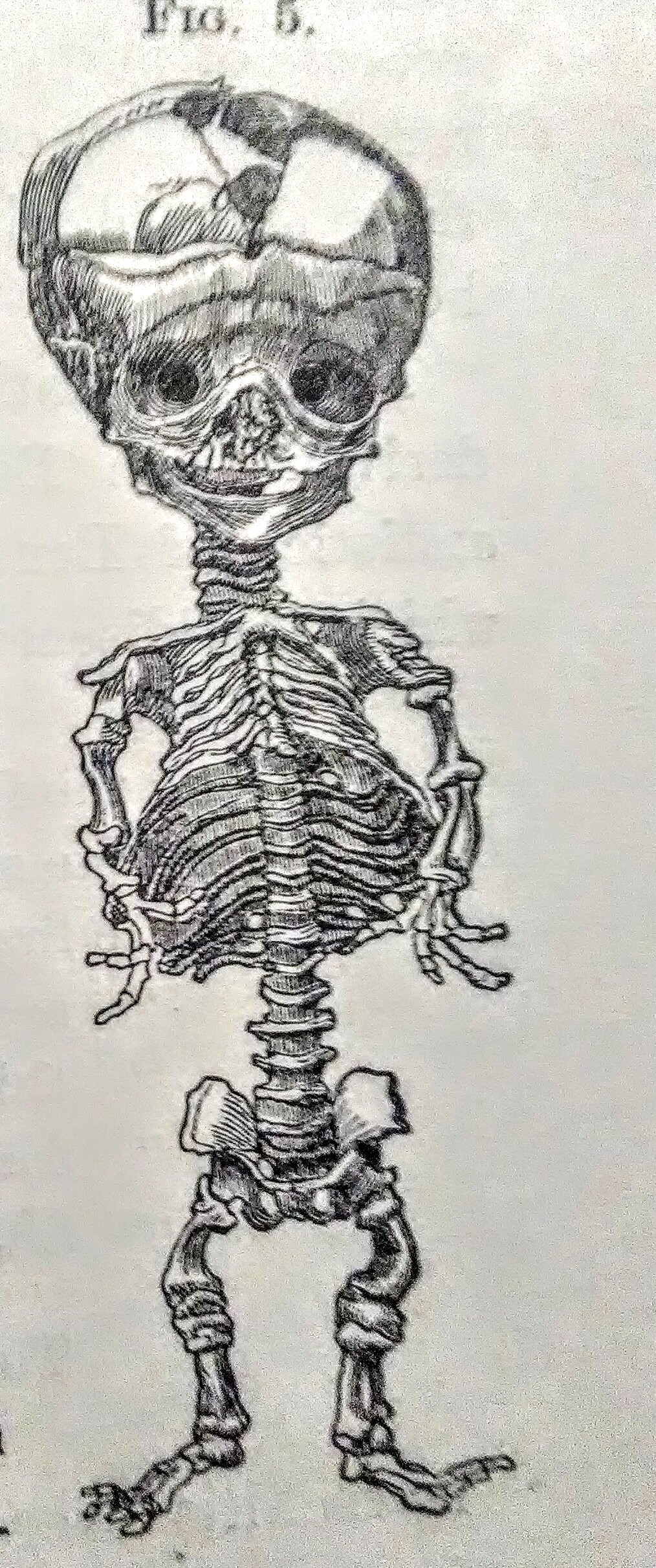
- Historic image: frontal bossing in rickets
- Specialty: Dermatology; Infectious diseases

Parrot's sign (19th century), refers to at least two medical signs; one relating to a large skull and another to a pupil reaction.

One Parrot's sign describes the bony growth noted at autopsy by Joseph-Marie-Jules Parrot and Jonathan Hutchinson on the skulls of children with congenital syphilis (CS) in the 19th century. Later publications also refer to it as the frontal bossing that presents in the late type CS. Initially thought to be indicative of congenital syphilis, it was noted to be present in other conditions, particularly rickets.

Some 19th century textbooks also described the sign as the dilatation of a pupil when the back of the neck is pinched in some cases of meningitis.

== Background ==
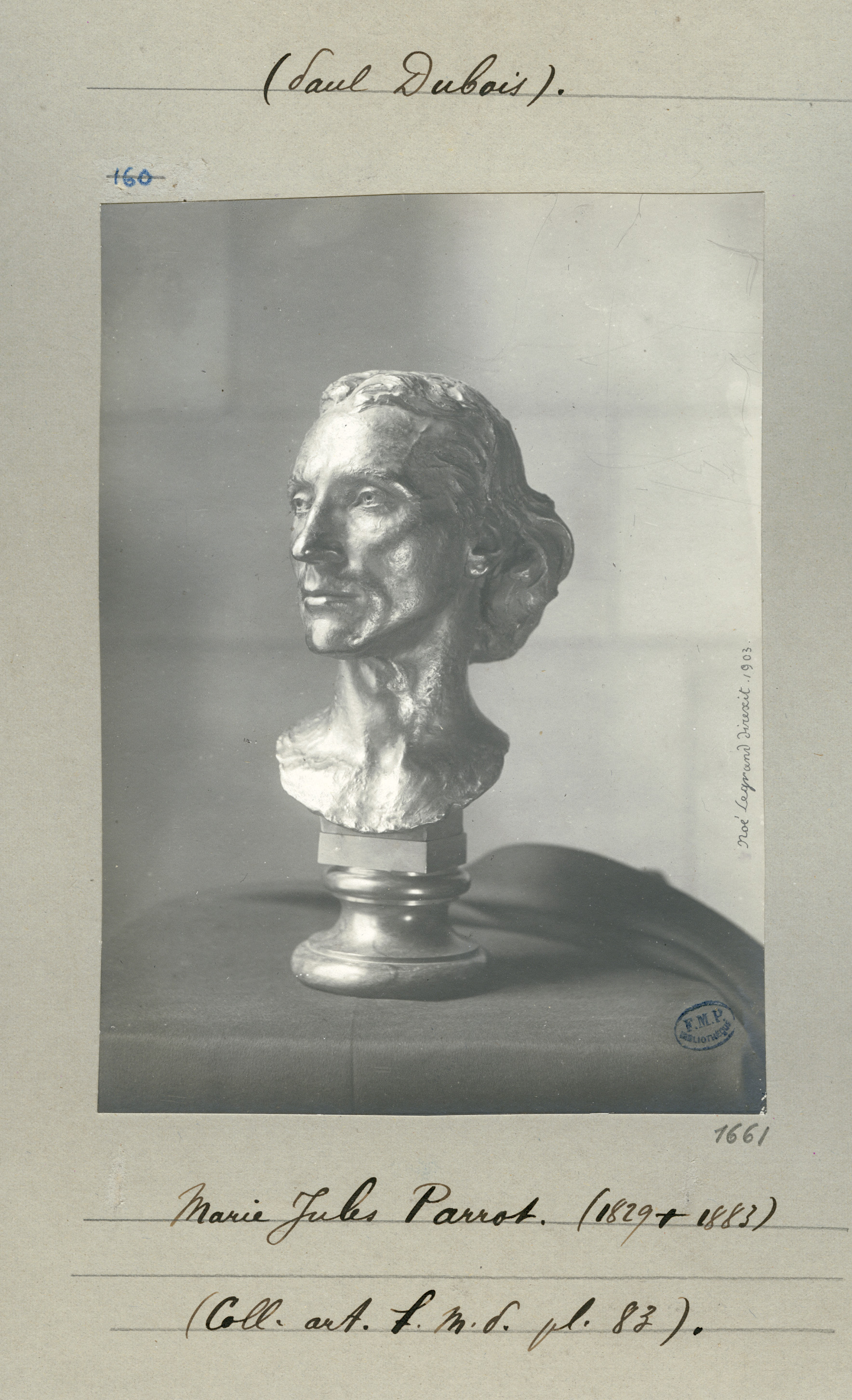
Parrot, Joseph Marie Jules (1829-1883)

Marie Jules Parrot was a French physician in Paris, whose early work concentrated on the brain, followed by tuberculosis and later syphilis.

== Skull ==
Parrot's sign, also known as 'Parrot's nodes' and 'Parrot's bosses', refers to the bony growth noted at autopsy by Marie Jules Parrot and Jonathan Hutchinson on the skulls of children with congenital syphilis (CS) in the 19th century. Later publications also describe it as the frontal bossing that presents in the late type CS. Initially thought to be indicative of congenital syphilis, it was noted to be present in other conditions, particularly rickets.

A description of bone findings in CS by Parrot was published in The Lancet in 1879 following his presentation at a meeting hosted by Jonathan Hutchinson and Thomas Barlow in London. In 1883 Barlow referred to the overgrowth of skull bone seen in CS as 'Parrot's swellings' and 'Parrot's bosses'. The nodes were said to be indicative of CS. In Timothy Holmes' and Thomas Pickering 's A Treatise on Surgery: Its Principles and Practice (1889) it was noted that Parrot's nodes could co-exist with thinning bone in the same skull. The nodes were described in Gray's Anatomy (1893) as appearing like buttocks or hot cross bun depending on which skull bones were affected. According to D'Arcy Power in 1895, they were first reported by Parrot and Hutchinson, and also found in rickets, and therefore could not strictly make them indicative of congenital syphilis. In Hamilton and Love's A Short Practice of Surgery (1959), Parrot's nodes were said to consist of patches of periostitis in CS.

== Pupil ==
Parrot's sign was described in some ophthalmology textbooks of the 19th century as the dilatation of a pupil when the back of the neck is pinched in some cases of meningitis.

== See also ==
- Ciliospinal reflex
