= External jugular vein =

Large blood vessel

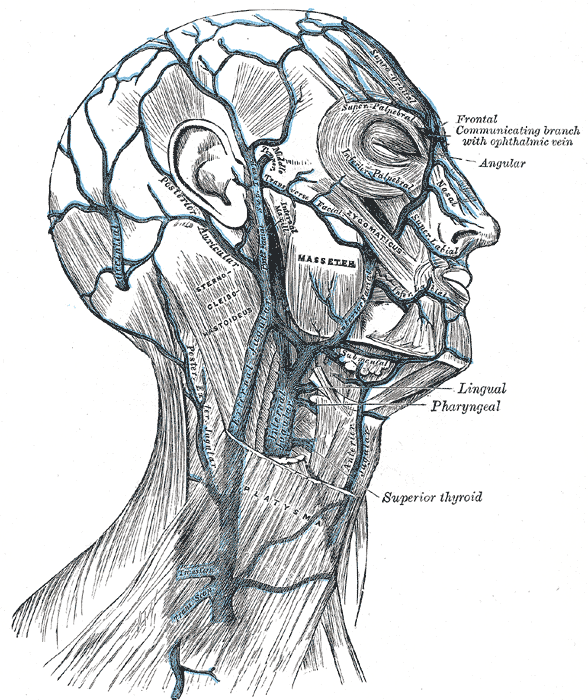
- Veins of the head and neck. (External jugular visible at center.)

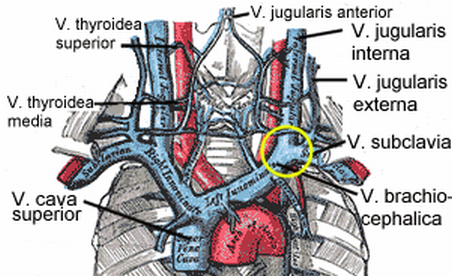
- Veins

Details
- Drains from: Cranium, face
- Source: Posterior facial vein, posterior auricular vein, retromandibular vein, anterior jugular vein, transverse cervical vein, suprascapular vein
- Drains to: Subclavian vein

Identifiers
- Latin: vena jugularis externa
- TA98: A12.3.05.045
- TA2: 4956
- FMA: 13110

The external jugular vein is a paired jugular vein which receives the greater part of the blood from the exterior of the cranium and the deep parts of the face, being formed by the junction of the posterior division of the retromandibular vein with the posterior auricular vein. In typical anatomy, the vein is visible through the skin.

== Structure ==
The external jugular vein commences in the substance of the parotid gland, on a level with the angle of the mandible, and runs perpendicularly down the neck, in the direction of a line drawn from the angle of the mandible to the middle of the clavicle superficial to the sternocleidomastoid muscle.

In its course, it crosses the sternocleidomastoid muscle obliquely, and in the subclavian triangle perforates the deep fascia, and ends in the subclavian vein lateral to or in front of the scalenus anterior, piercing the roof of the posterior triangle.

It is separated from the sternocleidomastoid muscle by the investing layer of the deep cervical fascia, and is covered by the platysma, the superficial fascia, and the integument; it crosses the cutaneous cervical nerve, and its upper half runs parallel with the great auricular nerve.

=== Valves ===
It is provided with two pairs of valves, the lower pair being placed at its entrance into the subclavian vein, the upper in most cases about 4 cm above the clavicle. The portion of vein between the two sets of valves is often dilated, and is termed the sinus.

These valves do not prevent the regurgitation of the blood, or the passage of injection from below upward.

=== Variation ===
The external jugular vein varies in size, bearing an inverse proportion to the other veins of the neck, it is occasionally double.

== Function ==
This vein receives the occipital vein occasionally, the posterior external jugular, and, near its termination, the transverse cervical, transverse scapular, and anterior jugular veins; in the substance of the parotid, a large branch of communication from the internal jugular joins it.

The external jugular vein drains into the subclavian vein lateral to the junction of the subclavian vein and the internal jugular vein.

== Clinical significance ==
The external jugular is a large vein used in prehospital medicine for venous access when a emergency medical technician (EMT) is unable to find another peripheral vein. It is commonly used in cardiac arrest or other situations where the patient is unresponsive due to the pain associated with the procedure. During a cardiac arrest, using this vein has the advantage of allowing the EMT to stay at the head and intubate the patient as well. Although many EMTs and paramedics use this vein, the American Heart Association still recommends the use of the cephalic vein.

== Additional images ==
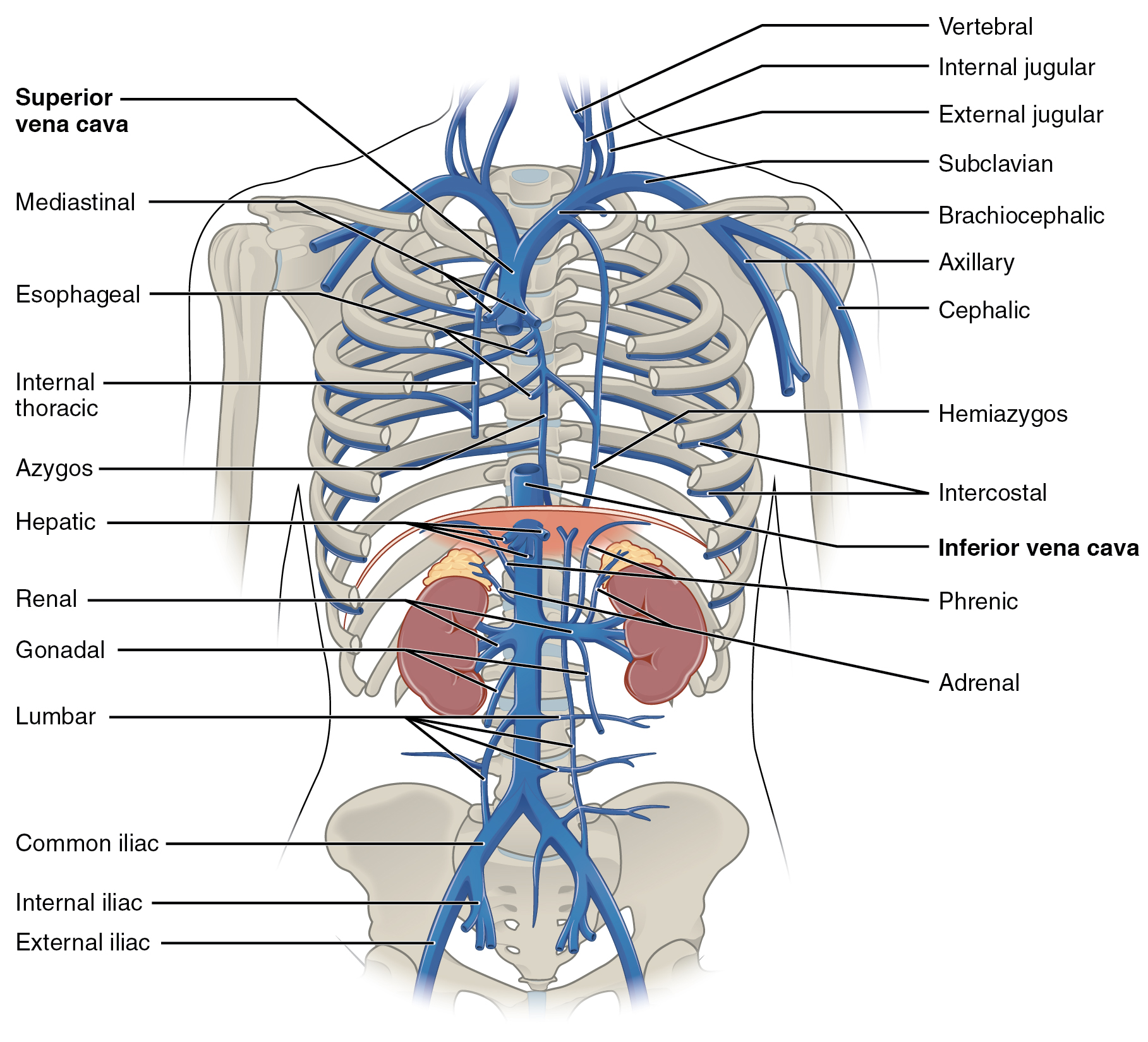
Veins of the thoracic and abdominal regions

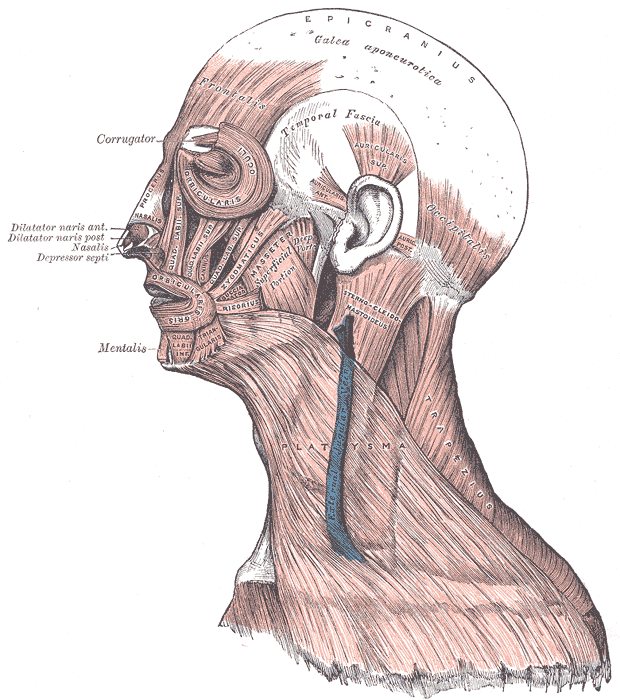
Muscles of the head, face, and neck.

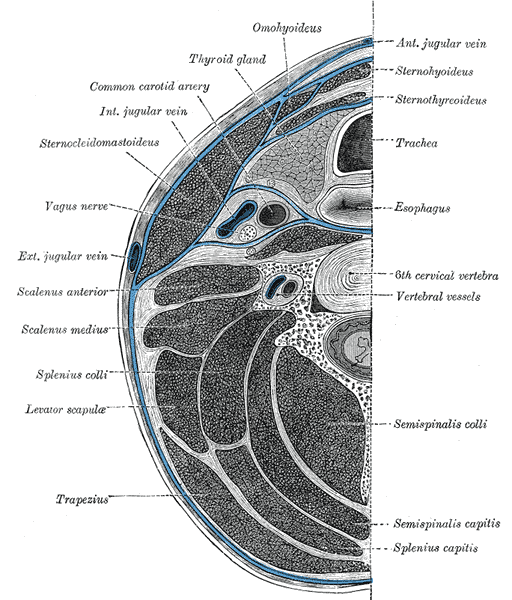
Section of the neck at about the level of the sixth cervical vertebra.

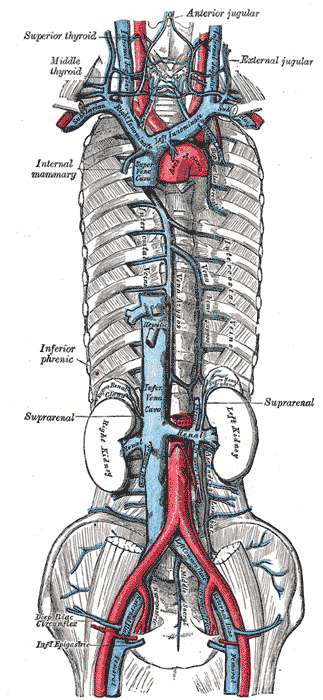
The venæ cavæ and azygos veins, with their tributaries.

== See also ==
- Chronic cerebrospinal venous insufficiency
- Jugular vein
