= Cavernous sinus =

Sinus in the human head

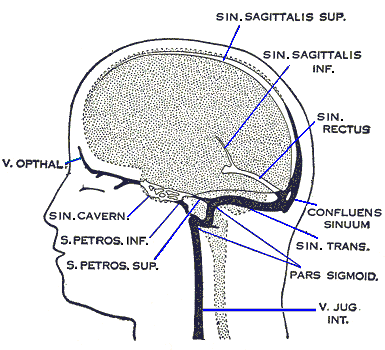
- Cavernous sinus (center, labeled "SIN. CAVERN.")

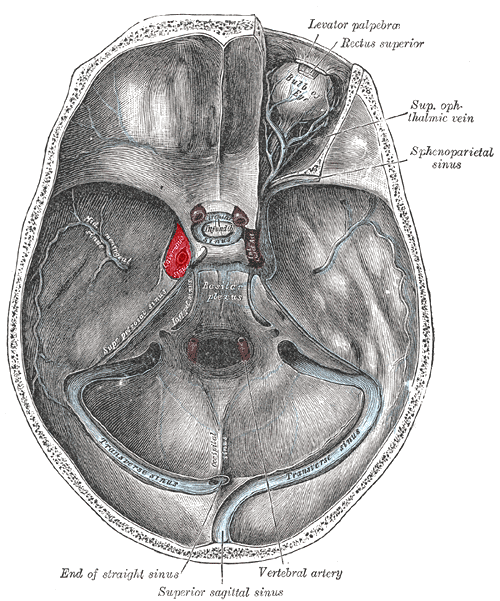
- The sinuses at the base of the skull. Cavernous sinus labeled in red

Details
- Source: Middle cerebral vein, sphenoparietal sinus, superior ophthalmic vein, inferior ophthalmic vein
- Drains to: Inferior petrosal sinus, superior petrosal sinus

Identifiers
- Latin: sinus cavernosus
- MeSH: D002426
- TA98: A12.3.05.116
- TA2: 4860
- FMA: 50772

Cavernous sinus

The cavernous sinus within the human head is one of the dural venous sinuses creating a cavity called the lateral sellar compartment bordered by the temporal bone of the skull and the sphenoid bone, lateral to the sella turcica.

== Structure ==
The cavernous sinus is one of the dural venous sinuses of the head. It is a network of veins that sit in a cavity. It sits on both sides of the sphenoidal bone and pituitary gland, approximately 1 × 2 cm in size in an adult. The carotid siphon of the internal carotid artery, and cranial nerves III, IV, V (branches V_{1} and V_{2}) and VI all pass through this blood filled space. Both sides of cavernous sinus are connected to each other via intercavernous sinuses. The cavernous sinus lies in between the inner and outer layers of dura mater.

=== Nearby structures ===
- Above: optic tract, optic chiasma, internal carotid artery.
- Inferiorly: foramen lacerum, and the junction of the body and greater wing of sphenoid bone.
- Medially: pituitary gland (hypophysis cerebri), and sphenoidal air sinus.
- Laterally: temporal lobe with uncus.
- Anteriorly: superior orbital fissure, and the apex of the orbit.
- Posteriorly: apex of petrous temporal bone.

=== Venous connections ===
The cavernous sinus receives blood from:

- Superior and inferior ophthalmic veins
- Sphenoparietal sinus
- Superficial middle cerebral veins
- Inferior cerebral veins

Blood leaves the sinus via superior and inferior petrosal sinuses as well as via the emissary veins through the foramina of the skull (mostly through foramen ovale). There are also connections with the pterygoid plexus of veins via inferior ophthalmic vein, deep facial vein and emissary veins.

=== Contents ===
Apart from the blood which passes through a venous sinus, several anatomical structures, including some cranial nerves and their branches, also pass through the sinus.

Structures within the outer (lateral) wall of the compartment from superior to inferior:

- Oculomotor nerve
- Trochlear nerve
- Ophthalmic and maxillary branches of the trigeminal nerve

Structures passing through the midline (medial) wall:

- Abducens nerve
- Internal carotid artery accompanied by the internal carotid plexus

These nerves, with the exception of CN V_{2}, pass through the cavernous sinus to enter the orbital apex through the superior orbital fissure. The maxillary nerve, division V_{2} of the trigeminal nerve travels through the lower portion of the sinus and exits via the foramen rotundum. The maxillary branch passes external to, but immediately adjacent to, the lateral wall of the sinus.

The optic nerve lies just above and outside the cavernous sinus, superior and lateral to the pituitary gland on each side, and enters the orbital apex via the optic canal.

== Function ==
=== Venous drainage ===
As a venous sinus, the cavernous sinus receives blood from the superior and inferior ophthalmic veins and from superficial cortical veins, and is connected to the basilar plexus of veins posteriorly. The cavernous sinus drains by two larger channels, the superior and inferior petrosal sinuses, ultimately into the internal jugular vein via the sigmoid sinus, also draining with emissary vein to pterygoid plexus.

== Clinical significance ==
It is the only anatomic location in the body in which an artery travels completely through a venous structure. If the internal carotid artery ruptures within the cavernous sinus, an arteriovenous fistula is created (more specifically, a carotid-cavernous fistula). Lesions affecting the cavernous sinus may affect isolated nerves or all the nerves traversing through it.

The pituitary gland lies between the two paired cavernous sinuses. An abnormally growing pituitary adenoma, sitting on the bony sella turcica, will expand in the direction of least resistance and eventually invade the cavernous sinus. Cavernous sinus syndrome may result from mass effect of these tumors and cause ophthalmoplegia (from compression of the oculomotor nerve, trochlear nerve, and abducens nerve), ophthalmic sensory loss (from compression of the ophthalmic nerve), and maxillary sensory loss (from compression of the maxillary nerve). A complete lesion of the cavernous sinus disrupts CN III, IV, and VI, causing total ophthalmoplegia, usually accompanied by a fixed, dilated pupil. Involvement of CN V (V_{1} and variable involvement of V_{2}) causes sensory loss in these divisions of the trigeminal nerve. Horner's syndrome can also occur due to involvement of the carotid ocular sympathetics, but may be difficult to appreciate in the setting of a complete third nerve injury.

Because of its connections with the facial vein via the superior ophthalmic vein, it is possible to get infections in the cavernous sinus from an external facial injury within the danger area of the face. In patients with thrombophlebitis of the facial vein, pieces of the clot may break off and enter the cavernous sinus, forming a cavernous sinus thrombosis. From there the infection may spread to the dural venous sinuses. Infections may also be introduced by facial lacerations and by bursting pimples in the areas drained by the facial vein.

Potential causes of cavernous sinus syndrome include metastatic tumors, direct extension of nasopharyngeal tumours, meningioma, pituitary tumors or pituitary apoplexy, aneurysms of the intracavernous carotid artery, carotid-cavernous fistula, bacterial infection causing cavernous sinus thrombosis, aseptic cavernous sinus thrombosis, idiopathic granulomatous disease (Tolosa–Hunt syndrome), and fungal infections. Cavernous sinus syndrome is a medical emergency, requiring prompt medical attention, diagnosis, and treatment.

== See also ==
- Cavernous sinus thrombosis
- Dural venous sinuses
