= Inferior ophthalmic vein =

Vein of the orbit around the eye

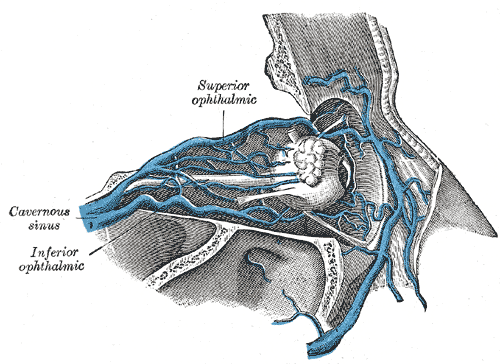
- Veins of orbit.

Details
- Drains to: Superior ophthalmic vein or cavernous sinus, and pterygoid venous plexus

Identifiers
- Latin: vena ophthalmica inferior
- TA98: A12.3.06.117
- TA2: 4900
- FMA: 51247

The inferior ophthalmic vein is a vein of the orbit that - together with the superior ophthalmic vein - represents the principal drainage system of the orbit. It begins from a venous network in the front of the orbit, then passes backwards through the lower orbit. It drains several structures of the orbit. It may end by splitting into two branches, one draining into the pterygoid venous plexus and the other ultimately (i.e. directly or indirectly) into the cavernous sinus.

== Structure ==
The inferior ophthalmic vein - together with the superior ophthalmic vein - represents the principal drainage system of the orbit. It forms/represents a connection between facial veins, and intracranial veins. It is valveless.

=== Origin ===
The inferior ophthalmic vein originates from a venous network at the anterior part of the floor and anterior part of the medial wall of the orbit.

=== Course ===
The inferior ophthalmic vein passes posterior-ward through the inferior orbit upon the inferior rectus muscle. It passes across (not through) the inferior orbital fissure before either draining into the superior ophthalmic vein within the orbit, or passing through or below the common tendinous ring and exiting the orbit through the superior orbital fissure to empty into the cavernous sinus.

=== Distribution ===
The inferior ophthalmic vein drains venous blood from the inferior rectus muscle, inferior oblique muscle, lateral rectus muscle, lacrimal sac, lower conjunctiva, and lower vorticose veins.

=== Fate ===
The inferior ophthalmic vein empties either into the superior ophthalmic vein (which subsequently drains into the cavernous sinus), or into the cavernous sinus directly.

Depending upon the source, it may terminate by splitting into two branches: one passing through the superior orbital fissure to drain into the superior ophthalmic vein or cavernous sinus; another passing through the inferior orbital fissure to empty into the pterygoid venous plexus. The branch to the pterygoid venous plexus may however instead be considered not a terminal branch but rather a communicating branch.

== Clinical significance ==
In periorbital cellulitis, the inferior ophthalmic vein may be compressed. This can increase pressure, causing oedema.

== See also ==
- Superior ophthalmic vein
