= Supraorbital vein =

Vein of the forehead

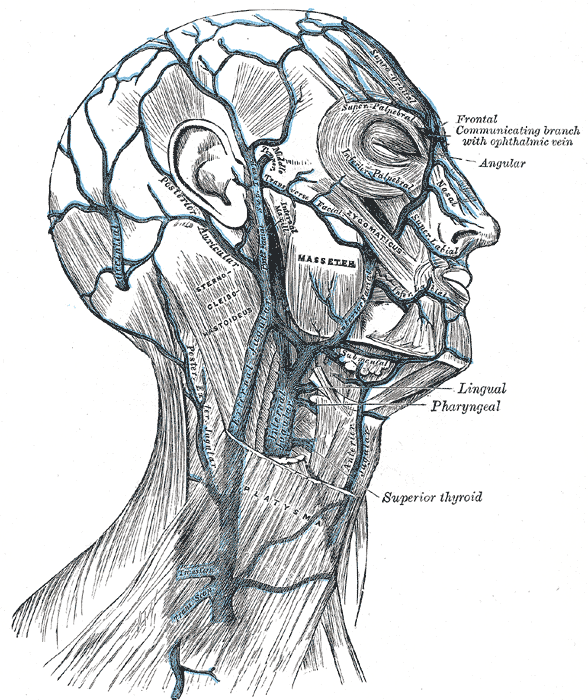
- Veins of the head and neck. (Supraorbital vein visible at upper right.)

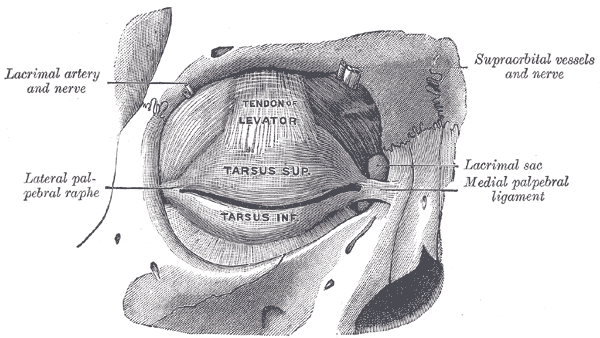
- The tarsi and their ligaments. Right eye; front view. (Supraorbital vessels labeled at upper right.)

Details
- Drains from: Forehead
- Drains to: Angular
- Artery: Supra-orbital

Identifiers
- Latin: vena supraorbitalis
- TA98: A12.3.05.021
- TA2: 4820
- FMA: 50904

The supraorbital vein is a vein of the forehead. It communicates with the frontal branch of the superficial temporal vein. It passes through the supraorbital notch, and merges with the angular vein to form the superior ophthalmic vein. The supraorbital vein helps to drain blood from the forehead, eyebrow, and upper eyelid.

== Structure ==
The supraorbital vein begins on the forehead, where it communicates with the frontal branch of the superficial temporal vein. It runs downward superficial to the frontalis muscle. It merges with the angular vein to form the superior ophthalmic vein.

Previous to its junction with the angular vein, it passes through the supraorbital notch into the orbit around the eye. As this vessel passes through the notch, it receives the frontal diploic vein through a foramen at the bottom of the notch.

== Function ==
The supraorbital vein helps to drain blood from the forehead, eyebrow, and upper eyelid.

== Additional images ==
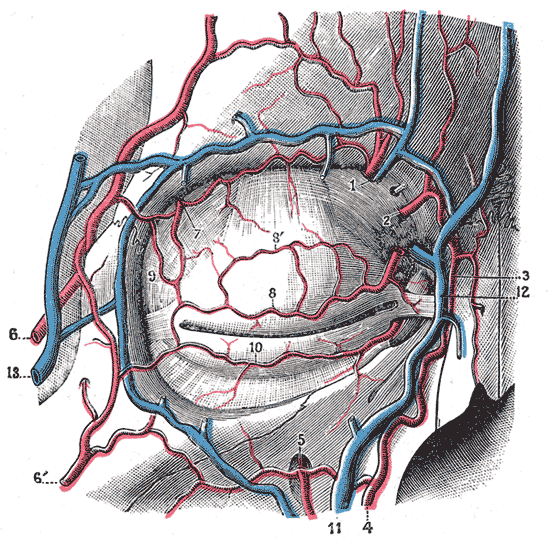
Bloodvessels of the eyelids, front view.

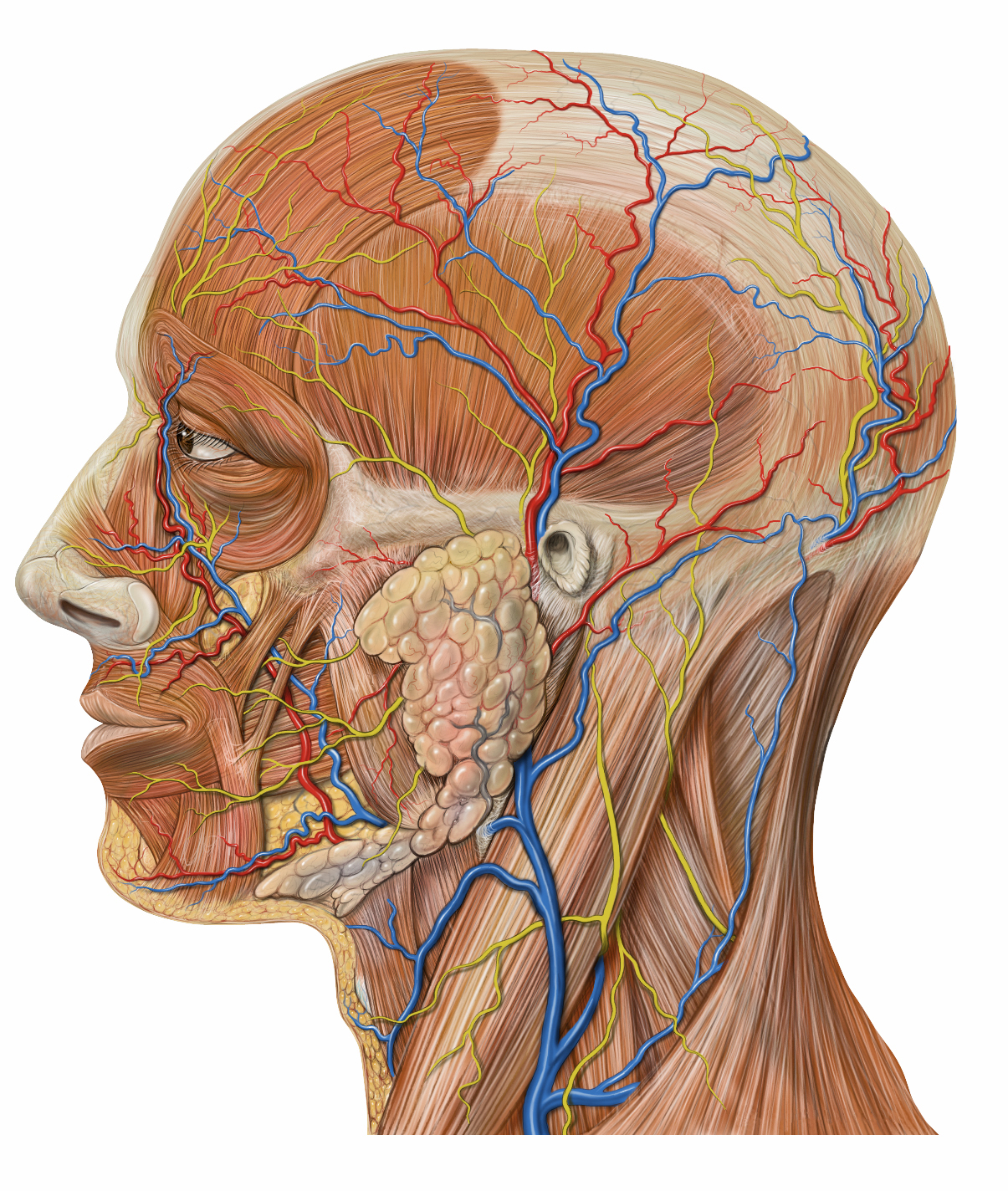
Lateral head anatomy detail

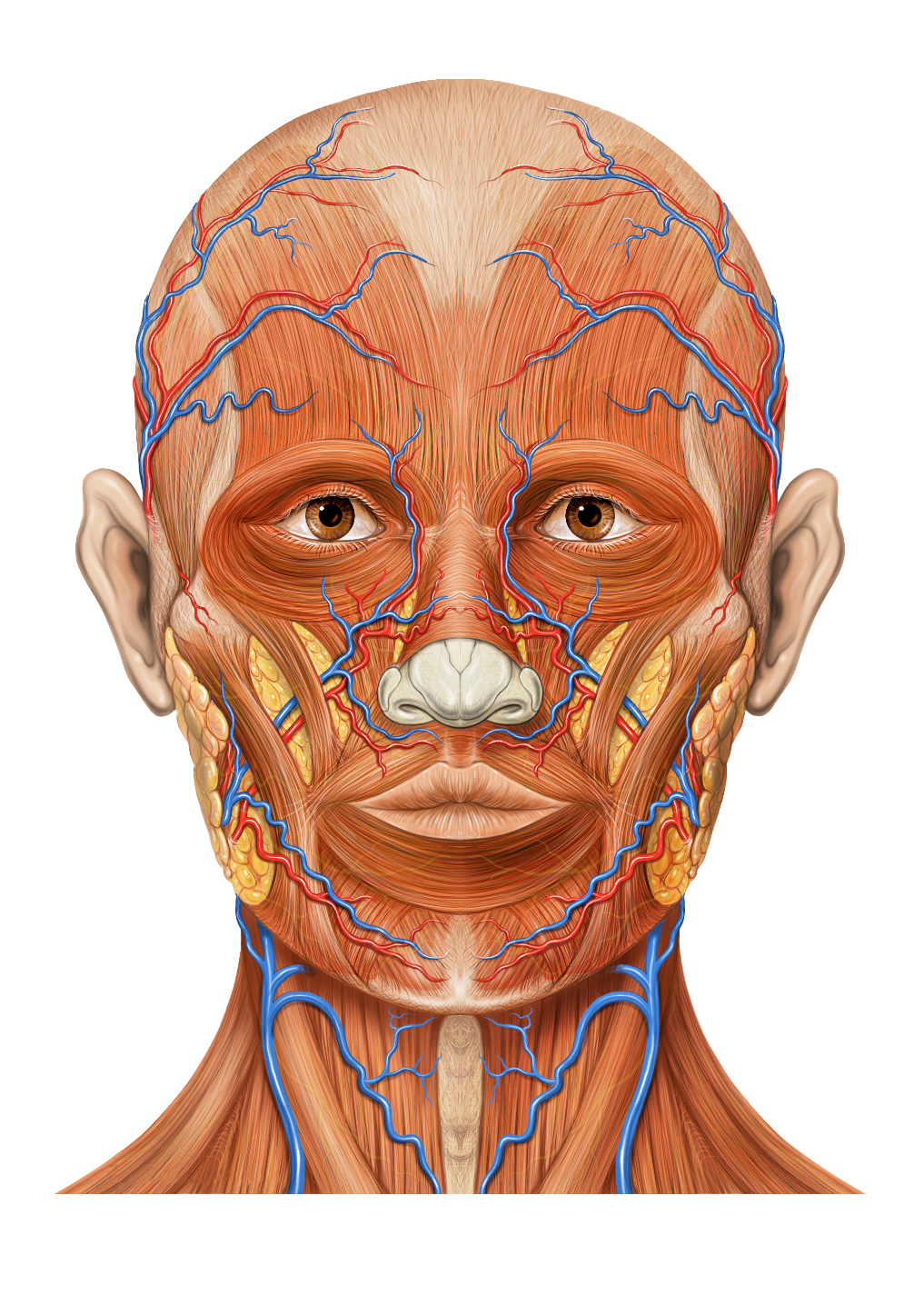
Head anatomy anterior view
