= Facial vein =

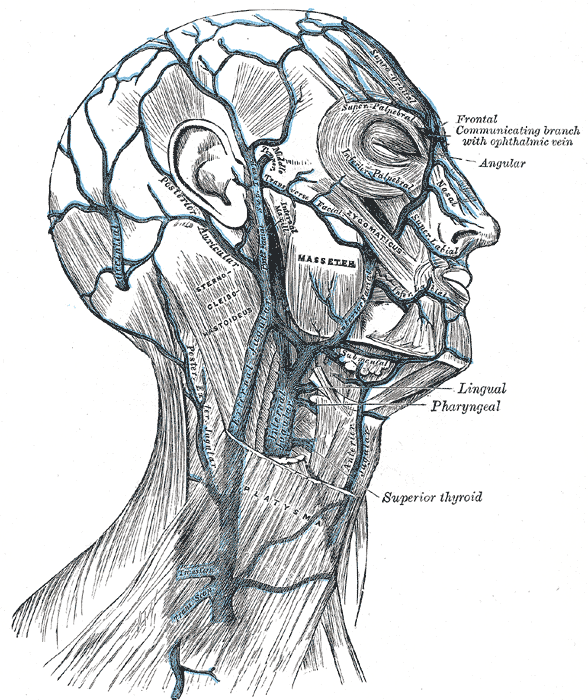
- Veins of the head and neck (facial vein labeles as Anterior facial at right center, at cheek, to right of masseter)

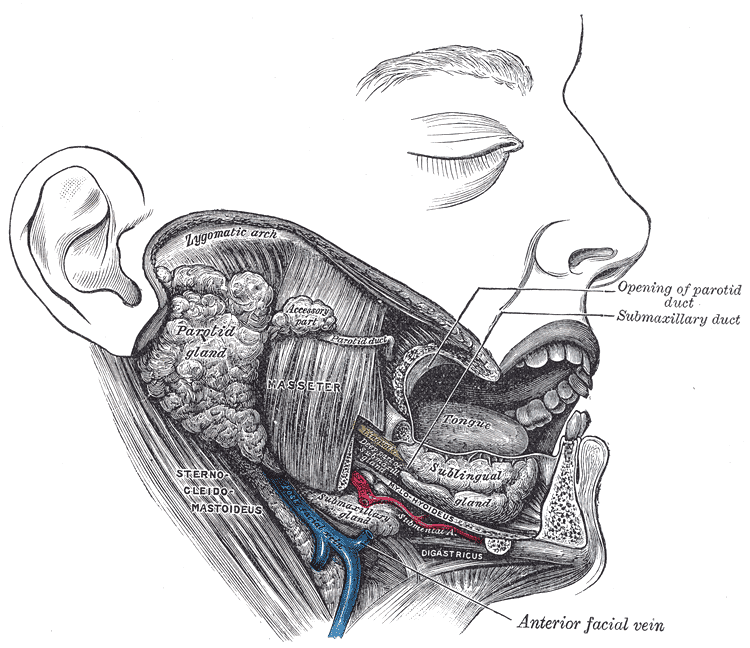
- Dissection, showing salivary glands of right side (facial vein labeled as Anterior facial vein at bottom right)

Details
- Drains from: Angular vein
- Drains to: Internal jugular vein
- Artery: Facial artery

Identifiers
- Latin: vena facialis anterior
- TA98: A12.3.05.018
- TA2: 4817
- FMA: 50874

The facial vein (or anterior facial vein) is a relatively large vein in the human face. It commences at the side of the root of the nose and is a direct continuation of the angular vein where it also receives a small nasal branch.

It lies behind the facial artery and follows a less tortuous course. It receives blood from the external palatine vein before it either joins the anterior branch of the retromandibular vein to form the common facial vein, or drains directly into the internal jugular vein. There are valves in the facial vein. Its walls are not so flaccid as most superficial veins.

== Path ==
From its origin it runs obliquely downward and backward, beneath the zygomaticus major muscle and zygomatic head of the levator labii superioris, descends along the anterior border and then on the superficial surface of the masseter, crosses over the body of the mandible, and passes obliquely backward, beneath the platysma and cervical fascia, superficial to the submandibular gland, the digastricus and stylohyoideus muscles.

== Clinical significance ==
Thrombophlebitis of the facial vein, (inflammation of the facial vein with secondary clot formation) can result in pieces of an infected clot extending into the cavernous sinus, forming thrombophlebitis of the cavernous sinus. Infections may spread from the facial veins into the dural venous sinuses. Infections may also be introduced by facial lacerations and by bursting pimples in the areas drained by the facial vein.

== Additional images ==
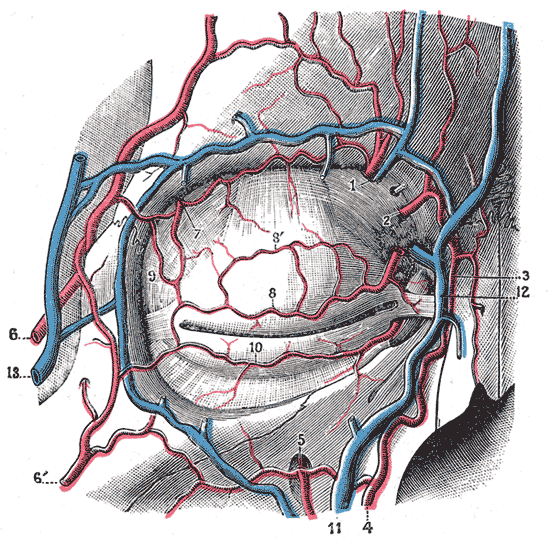
Bloodvessels of the eyelids seen from the front

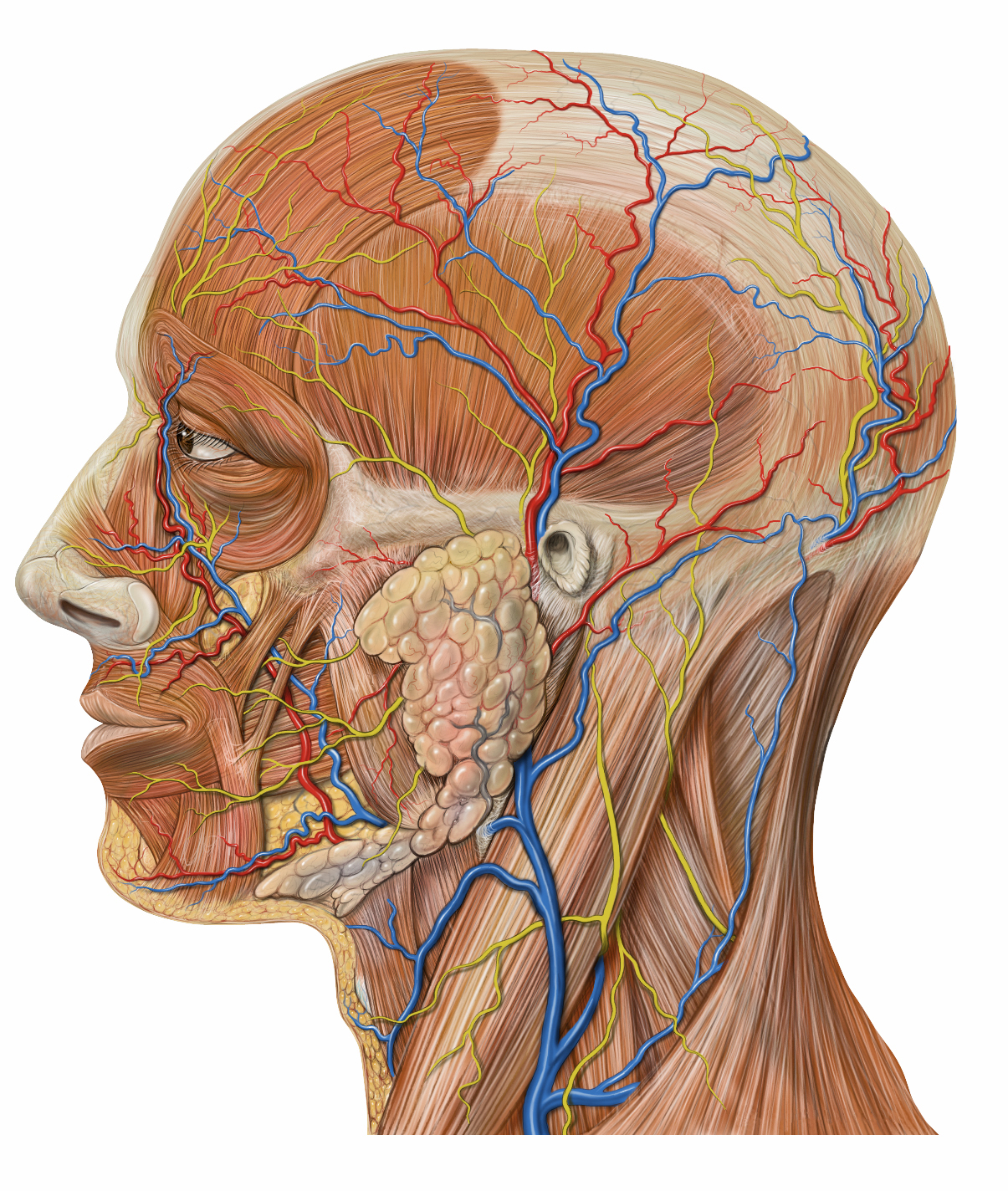
Anatomy of the human head seen from the side

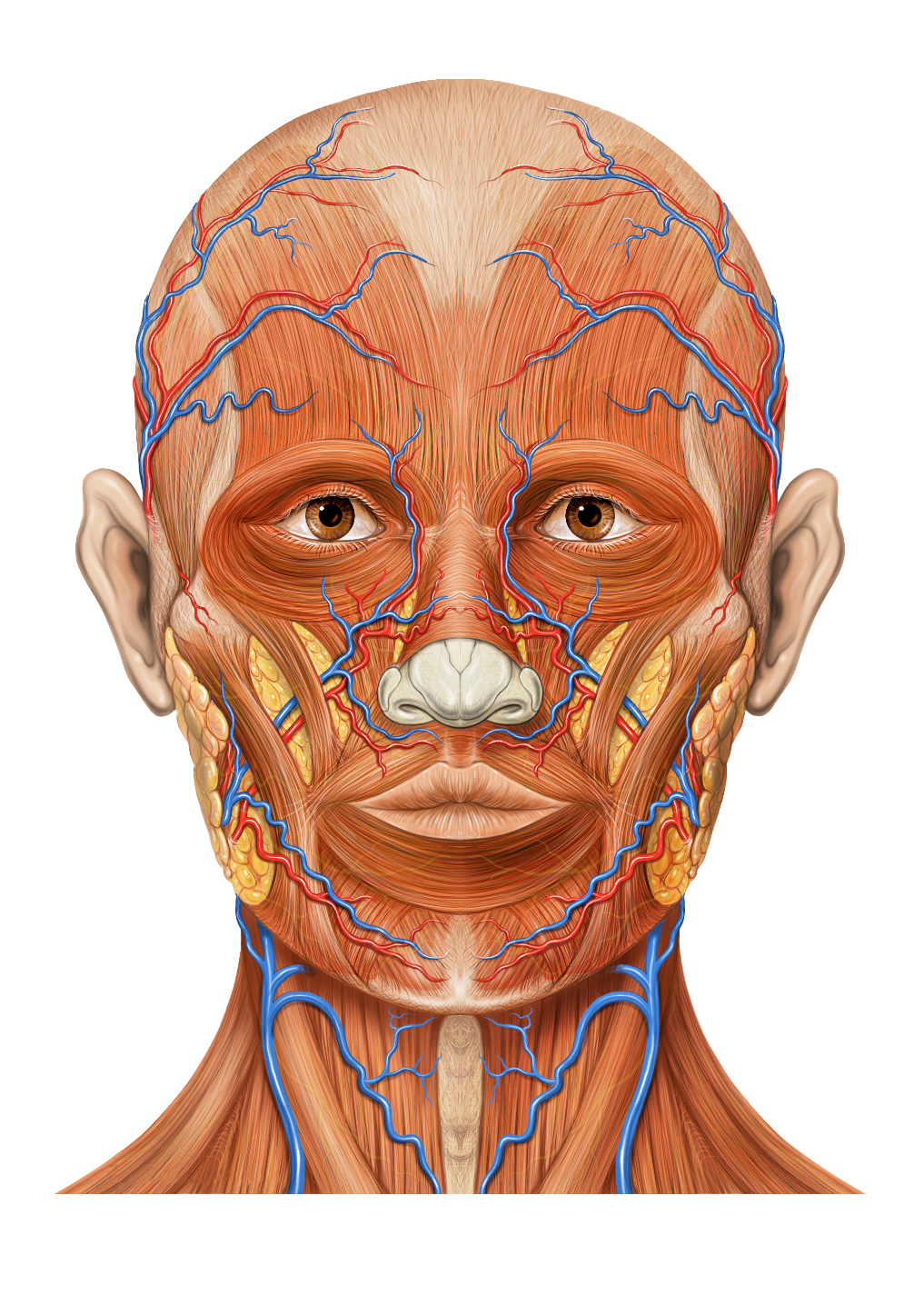
Anatomy of the human head seen from the front

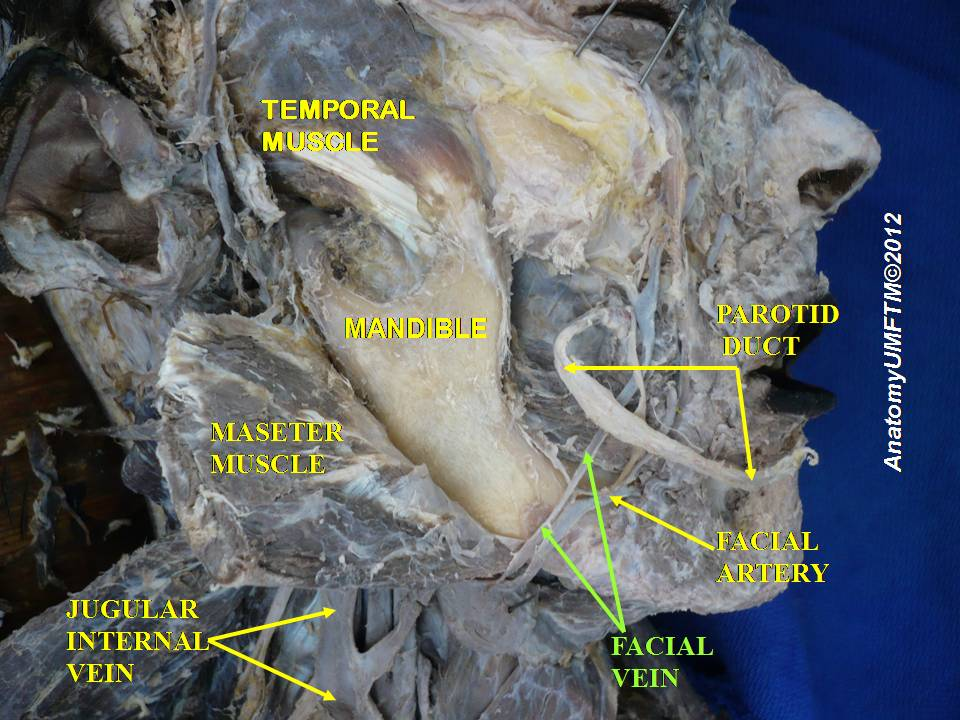
Dissected human head (facial vein labeled)

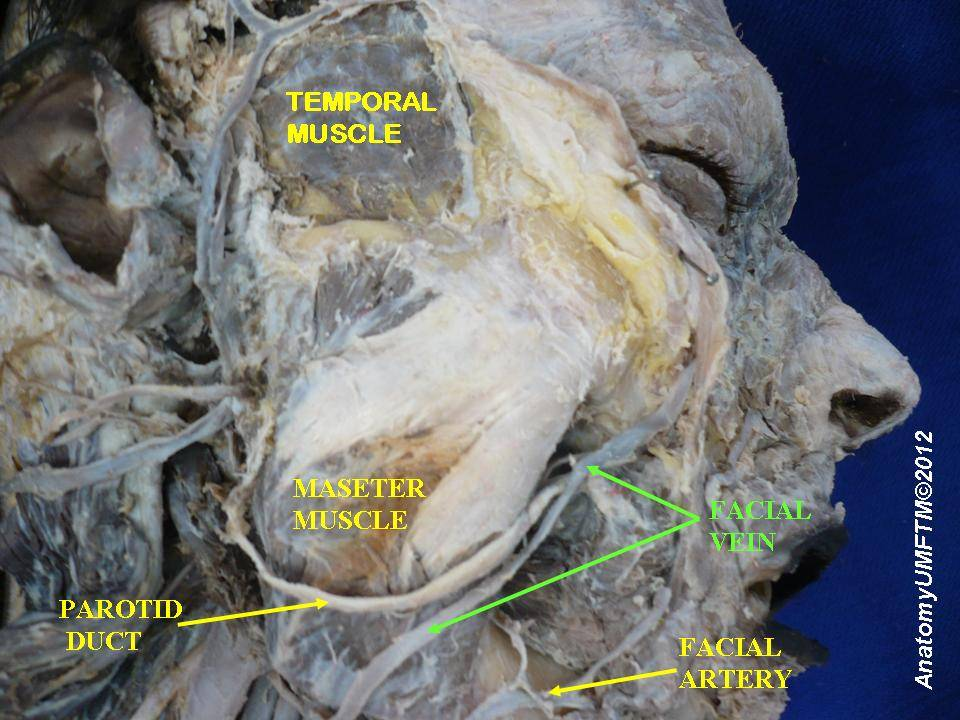
Dissected human head (facial vein labeled)
