= Rhytidectomy =

Type of cosmetic surgery

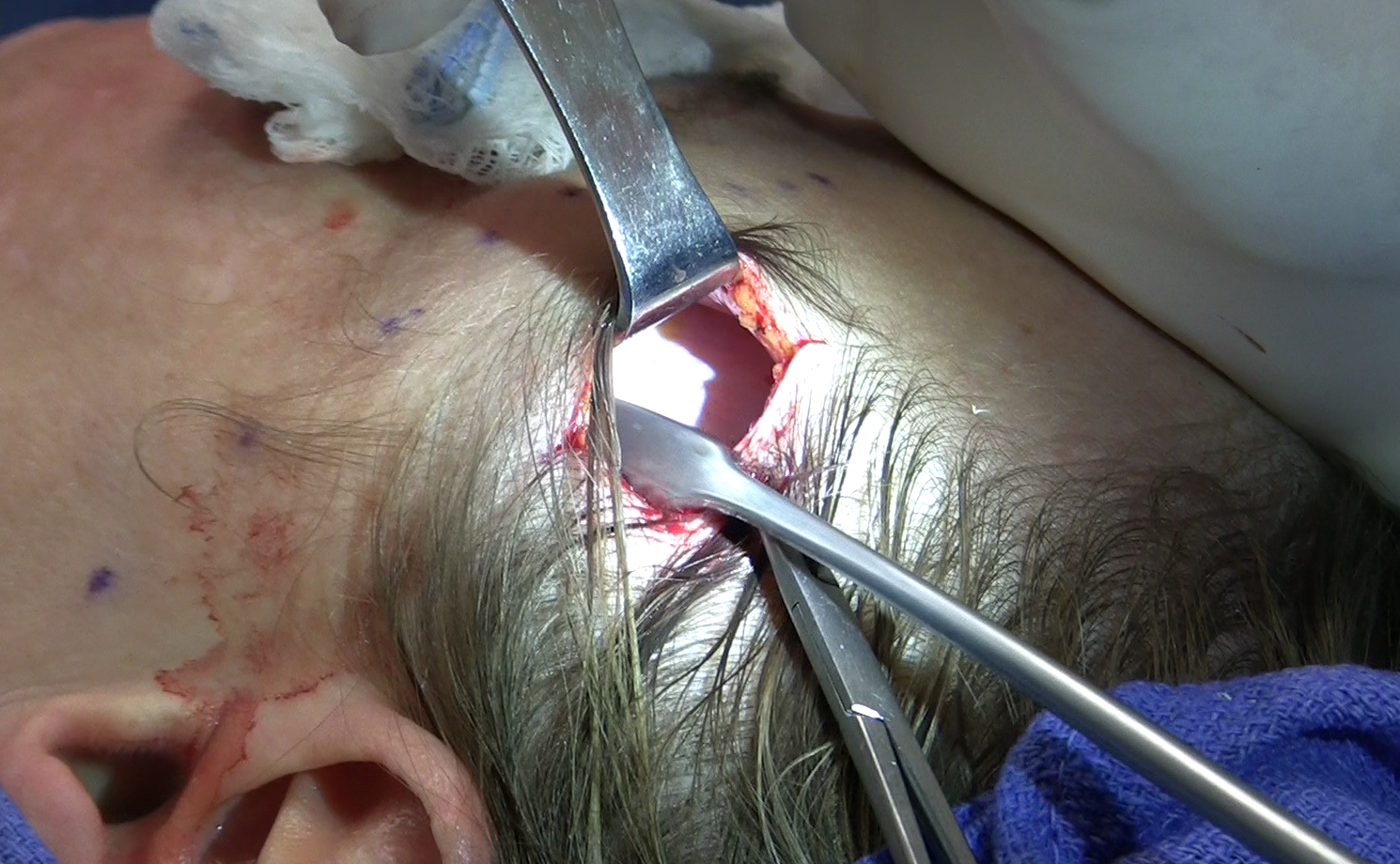
- Temporal incision behind the hairline in endoscopic midface lift (rhytidectomy). Note the shiny surface of the deep temporal fascia. This plane is dissected down to the orbital rim and connected to the midface subperiosteal plane created through the sublabial incision under the upper lip, and often through a lower eyelid incision.
- ICD-9-CM: 86.82
- MedlinePlus: 002989

A facelift, technically known as a rhytidectomy (from the Ancient Greek ῥυτίς (rhytis) 'wrinkle', and ἐκτομή (ektome) 'excision', the surgical removal of wrinkles), is a type of cosmetic surgery procedure intended to give a more youthful facial appearance. There are multiple surgical techniques. Surgery usually involves the removal of excess facial skin, with or without the tightening of underlying tissues, and the redraping of the skin on the patient's face and neck. Surgical facelifts are effectively combined with eyelid surgery (blepharoplasty) and other facial procedures and are typically performed under general anesthesia or deep twilight sleep.

According to the most recent American Society for Aesthetic Plastic Surgery facelifts were the third most popular aesthetic surgery in 2019, surpassed only by rhinoplasty and blepharoplasty.

Cost varies by country where surgery is performed. Prices were quoted ranging from US$2,500 (India and Panama) to US$15,000 (United States and Canada) as of 2008. Costs in Europe mostly ranged £4,000–9,000 as of 2009.

== History ==
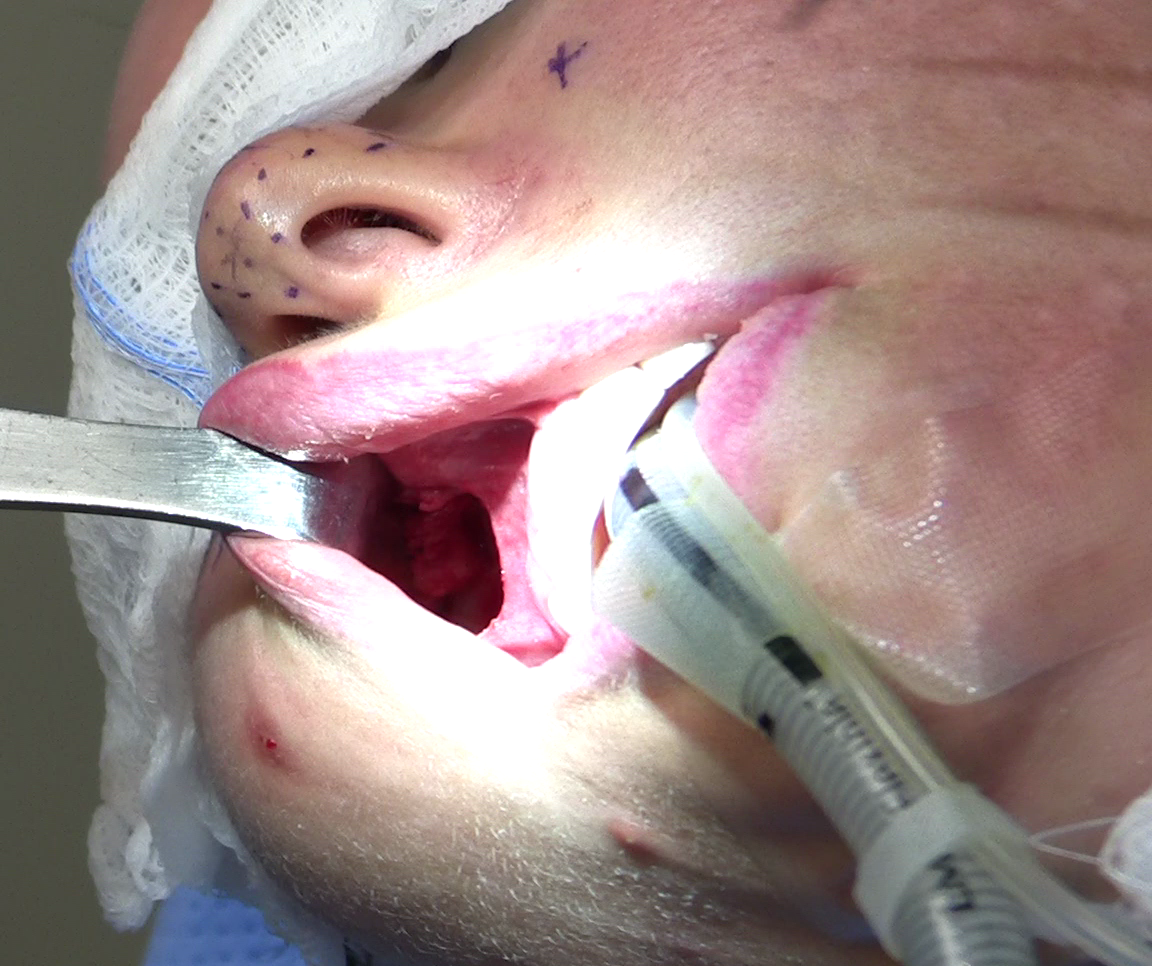
Sublabial incision through which periosteum of maxilla is elevated in an endoscopic midface lift (rhytidectomy)

=== Cutaneous period (1900–1970) ===
In the first 70 years of the 20th century, facelifts were performed by pulling on the skin on the face and cutting the loose parts off. The first facelift was reportedly performed by Eugen Holländer in 1901 in Berlin. An elderly Polish female aristocrat asked him to: "lift her cheeks and corners of the mouth". After much debate, he finally proceeded to excise an elliptical piece of skin around the ears. The first textbook about facial cosmetic surgery (1907) was written by Charles Miller (Chicago) entitled The Correction of Featural Imperfections.

In the First World War (1914–1918), the Dutch surgeon Johannes Esser made one of the most famous discoveries in the field of plastic surgery to date, namely the "skin graft inlay technique," the technique was soon used on both English and German sides in the war. At the same time, the British plastic surgeon Harold Delfs Gillies used the Esser-graft to school all those who flocked towards him who wanted to study under him. That's how he earned the name "Father of 20th Century Plastic Surgery". In 1919, Dr Passot was known to publish one of the first papers on face-lifting, this consisted mainly of the elevating and redraping of the facial skin. After this, many others began to write papers on face-lifting in the 1920s. From then, the aesthetic surgery was being performed on a large scale, form the basis of the reconstructive surgery. The first female plastic surgeon, Suzanne Noël, played a large role in its development and she wrote one of the first books about aesthetic surgery named Chirurgie Esthetique, son rôle social.

=== SMAS period (1970–1980) ===
In 1968, Tord Skoog introduced the concept of subfacial dissection, therefore providing suspension of the stronger deeper layer rather than relying on skin tension to achieve his facelift (he publishes his technique in 1974, with subfacial dissection of the platysma without detaching the skin in a posterior direction). In 1976, Mitz and Peyronie described the anatomical Superficial Musculoaponeurotic System, or SMAS, a term coined by Paul Tessier, Mitz and Peyronie's tutor in craniofacial surgery, after he had become familiar with Skoog's technique. After Skoog died of a heart attack, the superficial muscular aponeurotic system (SMAS) concept rapidly emerged to become the standard face-lifting technique, which was the first innovative change in facelift surgery in over 50 years.

=== Deep plane period (1980–1991) ===
Tessier, who had his background in the craniofacial surgery, made the step to a subperiosteal dissection via a coronal incision. In 1979, Tessier demonstrated that the subperiosteal undermining of the superior and lateral orbital rims allowed the elevation of the soft tissue and eyebrows with better results than the classic face-lifting. The objective was to elevate the soft tissue over the underlying skeleton to re-establish the patient's youthful appearance.

=== Volumetric period (since 1991) ===
At the start of this period in the history of the facelift, there was a change in conceptual thinking, surgeons started to care more about minimizing scars, restoring the subcutaneous volume that was lost during the ageing process and they started making use of a cranial direction of the "lift" instead of posterior.

The technique for performing a facelift went from simply pulling on the skin and sewing it back to aggressive SMAS and deep plane surgeries to a more refined facelift where variable options are considered to have an aesthetically good and a more long-lasting effect.

== Indications ==
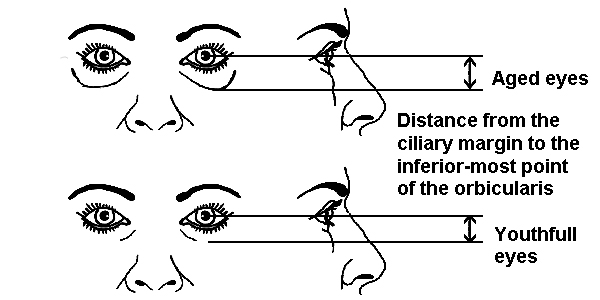
The difference between an aged eye and a youthful eye, looking at the distance from the cilliary margin to the inferior-most point of the orbicularis oculi muscle

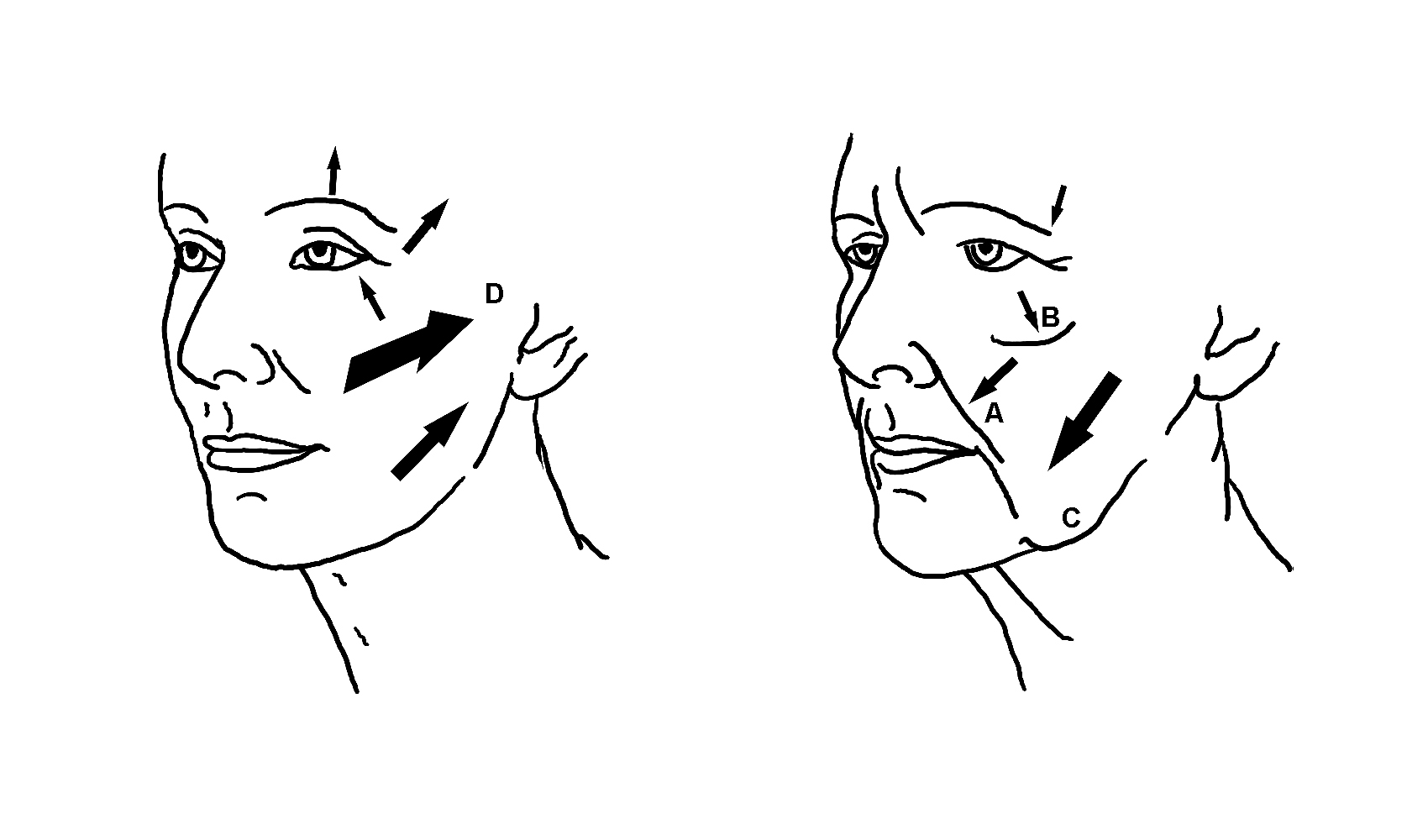
A. Increased redundancy of the nasolabial fold (caused by a descent of cheek fat) B. Increased distance from the ciliary margin to the inferior-most point of the orbicularis oculi muscle (caused by decreasing tone of the orbicularis oculi muscle) C. Jowl (a broken jaw line by ptosis of the platysma muscle) D. The intended effect of a facelift

A facelift is performed to rejuvenate the appearance of the face. Aging of the face is most shown by a change in position of the deep anatomical structures, notably the platysma muscle, cheek fat and the orbicularis oculi muscle. These lead up to three landmarks namely, an appearance of the jowl (a broken jaw line by ptosis of the platysma muscle), increased redundancy of the nasolabial fold (caused by a descent of cheek fat) and the increased distance from the ciliary margin to the inferior-most point of the orbicularis oculi muscle (caused by decreasing tone of the orbicularis oculi muscle). The skin is a fourth component in the aging of the face. The ideal age for face-lifting is at age 50 or younger, as measured by patient satisfaction. Some areas, such as the nasolabial folds or marionette lines, in some cases can be treated more suitably with Botox or liposculpture.

== Contraindications ==
Contraindications to facelift surgery include severe concomitant medical problems, both physical and psychological. While not absolute contraindications, the risk of postoperative complications is increased in cigarette smokers and patients with hypertension and diabetes. These strong relative contraindications consist primarily of diseases predisposing to poor wound healing. Patients are typically asked to abstain from taking aspirin or other blood thinners for at least one week prior to surgery. Patients motivations and expectations are an important factor in order to determine the patient's medical status. A psychiatric illness leading to unreasonable expectations for the surgical outcome, such as a distorted perception of reality, can be a contraindication to surgery. Some kinds of hypersensitivity to anesthesia are a contraindication.

== Surgical anatomy ==
Facelift: Generally relevant anatomy
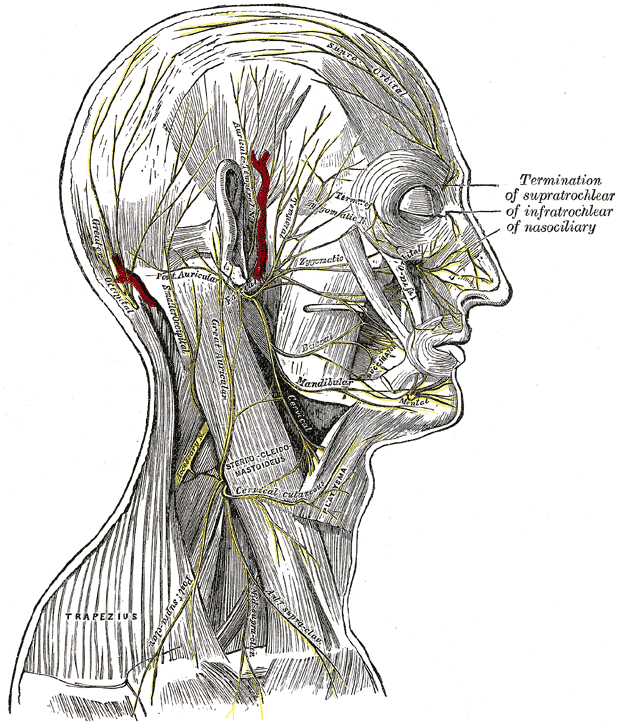
- Head nerves

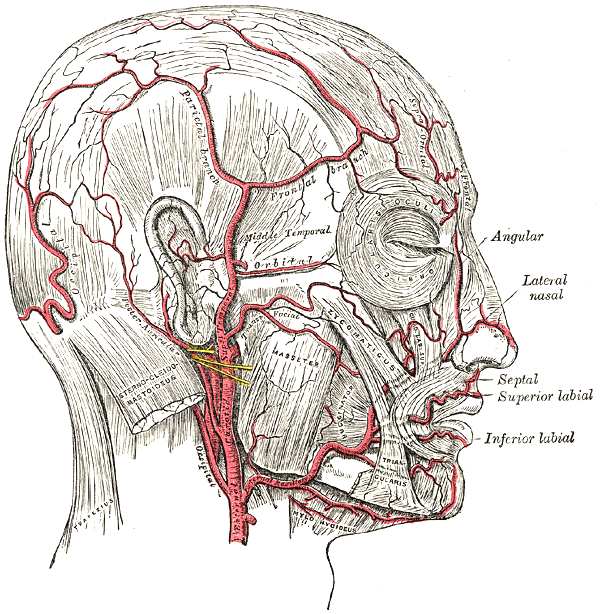
- Head arteries

Details
- Artery: Facial artery, Temporal artery, Arteria supratrochlearis, Arteria infraorbitalis
- Vein: Temporal vein
- Nerve: Greater auricular nerve, Facial nerve, Mental nerve

Identifiers
- MeSH: D015361

- SMAS
- Facial musculature
- Facial nerve

A dissection in the deep plane can mostly be performed safely, because the facial nerve innervates the facial muscles on the deep surface of these muscles (except for the muscles which are lying deep to the facial nerve, the mentalis, the levator anguli oris and the buccinator). The fibres of the nerve are becoming more superficially medially. Therefore, the dissection of a deep plane begins further away of the surface then it ends. This allows the undermining to be carried out towards the nasolabial fold without harming the branches of the facial nerve.

- Retaining ligaments

The retaining ligaments in the face provide an anchorage of superficial structures to underlying bone. Four retaining ligaments exist. The platysma-cutaneous ligaments and the platysma-auricular ligament are aponeurotic condensations which connect the platysma to the dermis. The osteocutaneous ligaments, the zygomatic ligament and the mandibular ligament, are more important. They attach to the skin and bone, leading to a counteraction of gravitational forces. These ligaments should be released surgically to obtain a fully mobile facelift flap.

- Nasolabial folds
- Melolabial folds (marionette lines)
- Greater auricular nerve

Injury to the greater auricular nerve is the most seen nerve injury after rhytidectomy. Care should be taken in elevation over the sternocleidomastoid muscle, because of the terminal branches of the nerve that pass superficially to innervate the earlobe.

- Vascularisation

The composite flap is vascularised by facial, angular and/or inferior orbital arteries. The facial artery supplies the platysma and goes on as the angular artery, which connects with the branches of the arteria supratrochlearis and arteria infraorbitalis. The parts of the face elevated are in continuity in the deep-plane and the composite rhytidectomy include the SMAS layer in the lower face, subcutaneous tissue and the skin as the arteries to these parts are preserved. With this option you can create a well vascularized tissue flap, which can be used to tighten the skin without loss of vascularization, this will result in fewer complications like skin slough and necrosis.

== Procedures ==
Many different procedures are used for rhytidectomy. The differences are mostly the type of incision, the invasiveness and the area of the face that is treated. Each surgeon practices multiple different types of facelift surgery. At a consultation the procedure with the best outcome is chosen for every patient. Expectations of the patient, the age, possible recovery time and areas to improve are some of the many factors taken in consideration before choosing a technique of rhytidectomy.

In the traditional facelift, an incision is made in front of the ear extending up into the hairline. The incision curves around the bottom of the ear and then behind it, usually ending near the hairline on the back of the neck. After the skin incision is made, the skin is separated from the deeper tissues with a scalpel or scissors (also called undermining) over the cheeks and neck. At this point, the deeper tissues (SMAS, the fascial suspension system of the face) can be tightened with sutures, with or without removing some of the excess deeper tissues. The skin is then redraped, and the amount of excess skin to be removed is determined by the surgeon's judgement and experience. The excess skin is then removed, and the skin incisions are closed with sutures and staples.

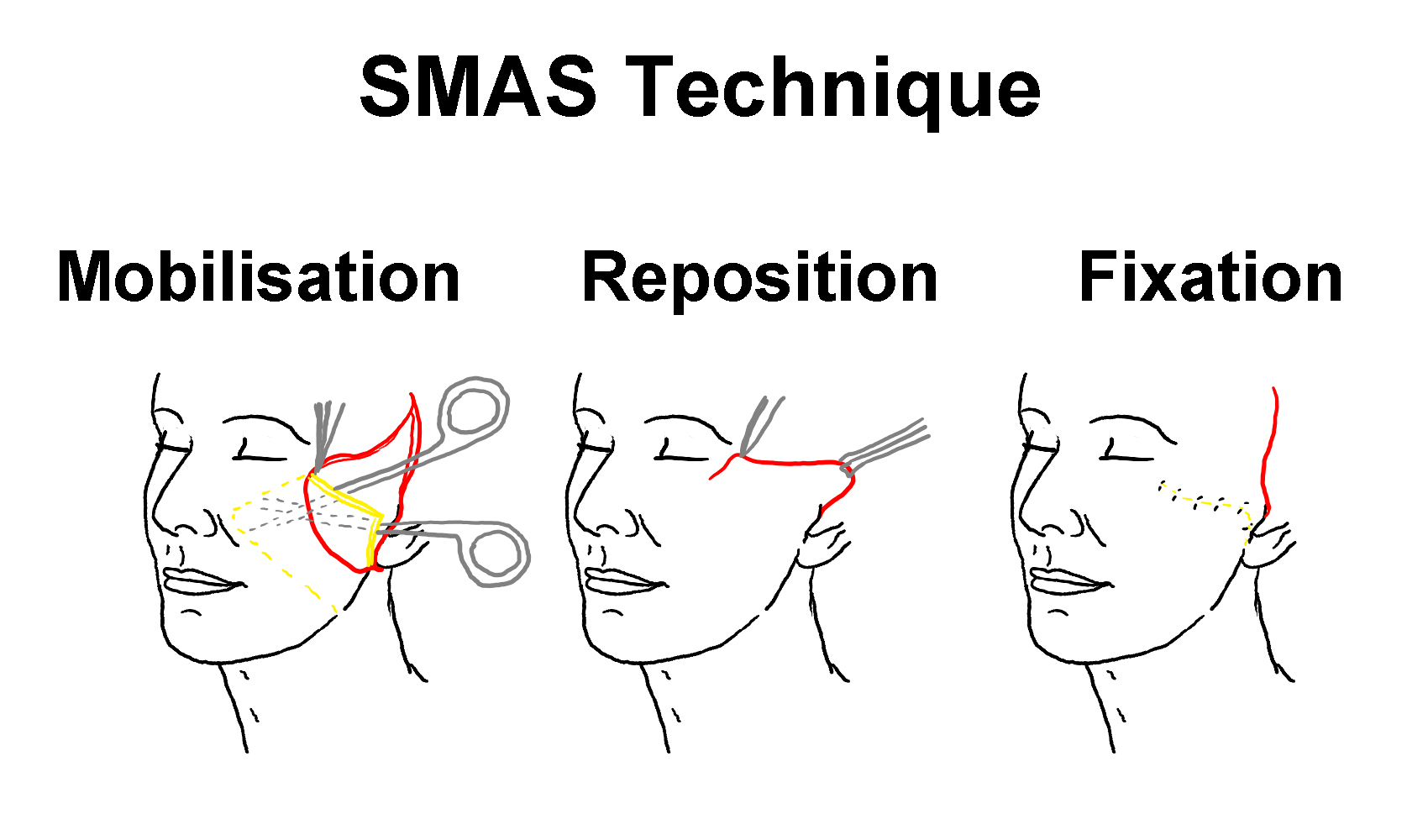
The technique of a SMAS facelift, consisting of mobilisation, repositioning and fixating

=== SMAS facelift ===
The SMAS (Superficial Musculoaponeurotic System) is a fibromuscular layer that envelops the muscles of facial expression and is continuous with the platysma in the neck. It functions in conjunction with retaining ligaments and facial fat compartments to support and transmit movement to the overlying skin. In facelift surgery, manipulation of the SMAS allows for repositioning of deeper facial structures to restore contour and address age-related soft tissue laxity.

Resuspension and stabilization of the SMAS can contribute to facial rejuvenation by counteracting gravitational descent and structural changes associated with aging. These procedures are often performed in conjunction with other facial rejuvenation techniques, such as blepharoplasty, depending on the patient's anatomy and aesthetic goals.

SMAS Plication

SMAS plication involves folding and suturing the SMAS without extensive dissection. This technique provides moderate tightening of the underlying structures and is generally considered less invasive than flap-based approaches, though it may offer more limited tissue mobilization.

SMAS Flap (Imbrication)

SMAS flap techniques involve elevation and repositioning of the SMAS as a distinct layer. By mobilizing the SMAS, surgeons can achieve more substantial lifting and redraping of facial tissues compared with plication methods.

Extended SMAS Techniques

More advanced approaches extend beyond superficial SMAS manipulation to address deeper structural components. These include composite facelift and deep-plane facelift techniques, which involve dissection beneath the SMAS and release of retaining ligaments to allow repositioning of the midface and related structures.

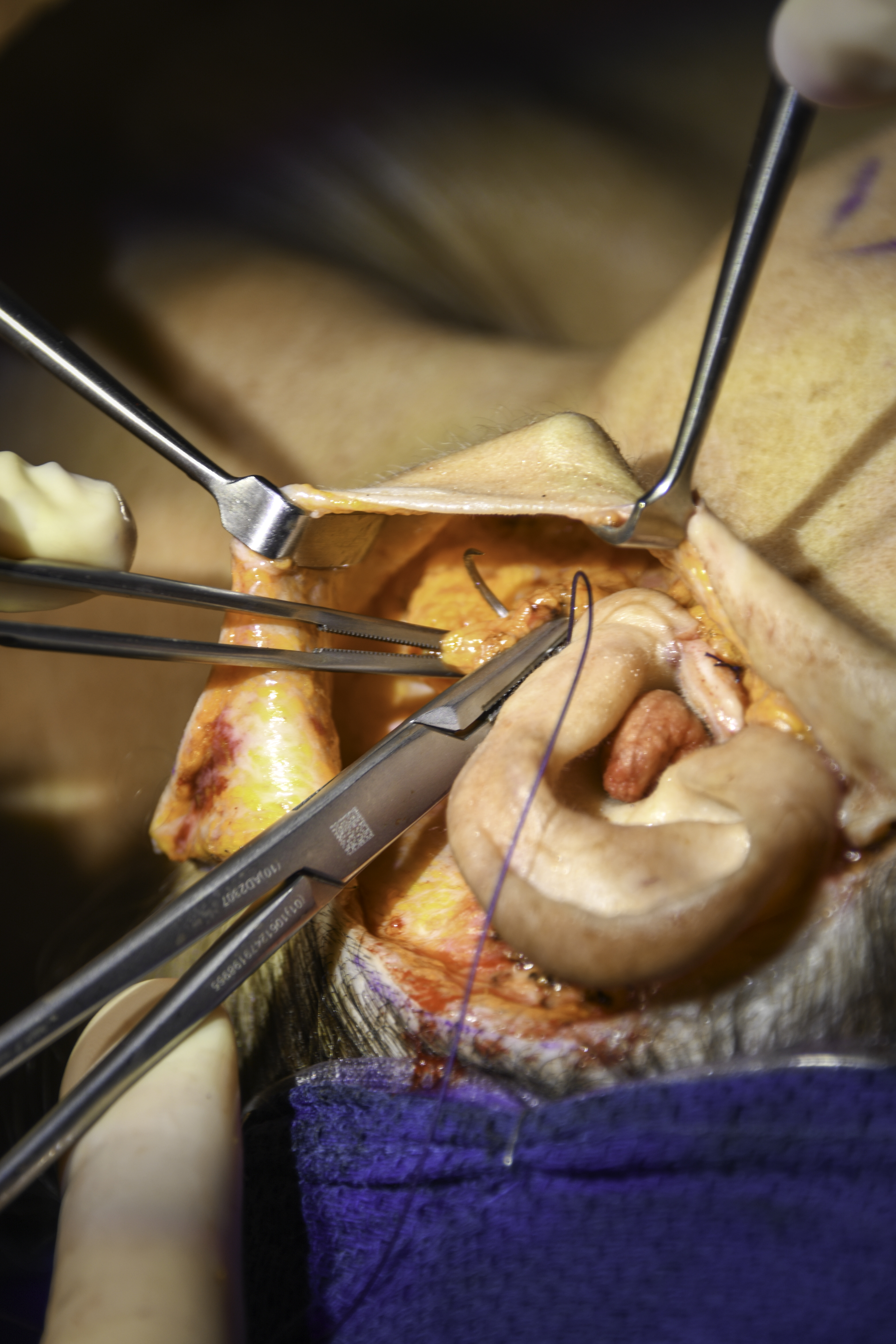
Deep plane facelift showing elevation of deeper facial tissues and SMAS layer behind the ear

=== Deep-Plane facelift ===
The deep-plane facelift is a rhytidectomy technique in which dissection is performed beneath the superficial musculoaponeurotic system (SMAS), allowing the skin and underlying soft tissues to be elevated as a single unit. This approach permits mobilization of the midface, including the malar fat pad and release of selected retaining ligaments that contribute to facial aging.

Compared with SMAS plication or SMAS flap techniques, which reposition the SMAS more superficially, the deep-plane approach addresses structural descent at a deeper level. This can allow for repositioning of facial tissues with reduced reliance on skin tension and more direct correction of features such as the nasolabial fold and jowling.

Because dissection occurs closer to branches of the facial nerve, the technique is generally considered more technically demanding and requires detailed knowledge of facial anatomy and safe dissection planes.

Preservation Concepts in Deep-Plane Facelift

Within deep-plane facelift surgery, some approaches emphasize preservation of key anatomical structures while selectively releasing retaining ligaments. These techniques focus on repositioning deeper tissues with minimal disruption to vascular supply and soft tissue attachments, rather than wide dissection.

Such methods are generally considered refinements of established deep-plane techniques, aiming to maintain natural facial movement and reduce tissue trauma while achieving structural rejuvenation.

=== Composite facelift ===
The composite facelift is a modification of deep-plane rhytidectomy in which the skin, superficial musculoaponeurotic system (SMAS), and orbicularis oculi muscle are elevated and repositioned as a single, continuous unit. This approach extends dissection into the periorbital region, allowing for repositioning of the orbicularis oculi muscle in addition to the midface structures.

By addressing both the midface and lower eyelid as a composite flap, the technique can improve features associated with aging such as midfacial descent and lower eyelid–cheek junction changes. It has been described as an extension of deep-plane facelift principles with more comprehensive mobilization of facial soft tissues.

=== Mid face-lift ===
The mid face area, the area between the cheeks, flattens and makes a woman's face look slightly more masculine. The mid face-lift is suggested to people where these changes occur, yet without a significant degree of jowling or sagging of the neck. In these cases a mid face-lift is sufficient to rejuvenate the face opposed to a full facelift, which is a more drastic surgery. The ideal candidates for a mid face-lift is when a person is in his 40s, or if the cheeks appear to be sagging and the nasolabial area has laxity or skin folds. To achieve a younger appearance the surgeon makes several small incisions along the hairline and inside the mouth, this way the fatty tissue layers can be lifted and repositioned. This way there are practically no scars. The fatty layer that lies over the cheekbones is also lifted and repositioned. This improves the nose-to-mouth lines and the roundness over the cheekbones. The recovery time is rather short and this procedure is often combined with a blepharoplasty (eyelid surgery)

=== Mini-facelift ===
The mini-facelift is the least invasive type of facelift which is similar to a full facelift, the only difference is the omission of the neck lift in the mini lift procedure. It is also called the 'S' lift because of the shape of the incision that is used or the 'short-scar' facelift. This lift is a more temporary solution to the ageing of the face which also has less downtime and is done on people who have deep nasolabial folds, sagging facial structures, yet still have a firm and well-contoured neck. The position of the incision is usually made from the hairline around the ear with scars hidden in the natural crease of the skin. The mini lift can be performed with an endoscope, which is used to reposition the soft tissues. After this, the skin is repositioned by the surgeon with small sutures. This type of lift is a good alternative to the full facelift to people with premature ageing.

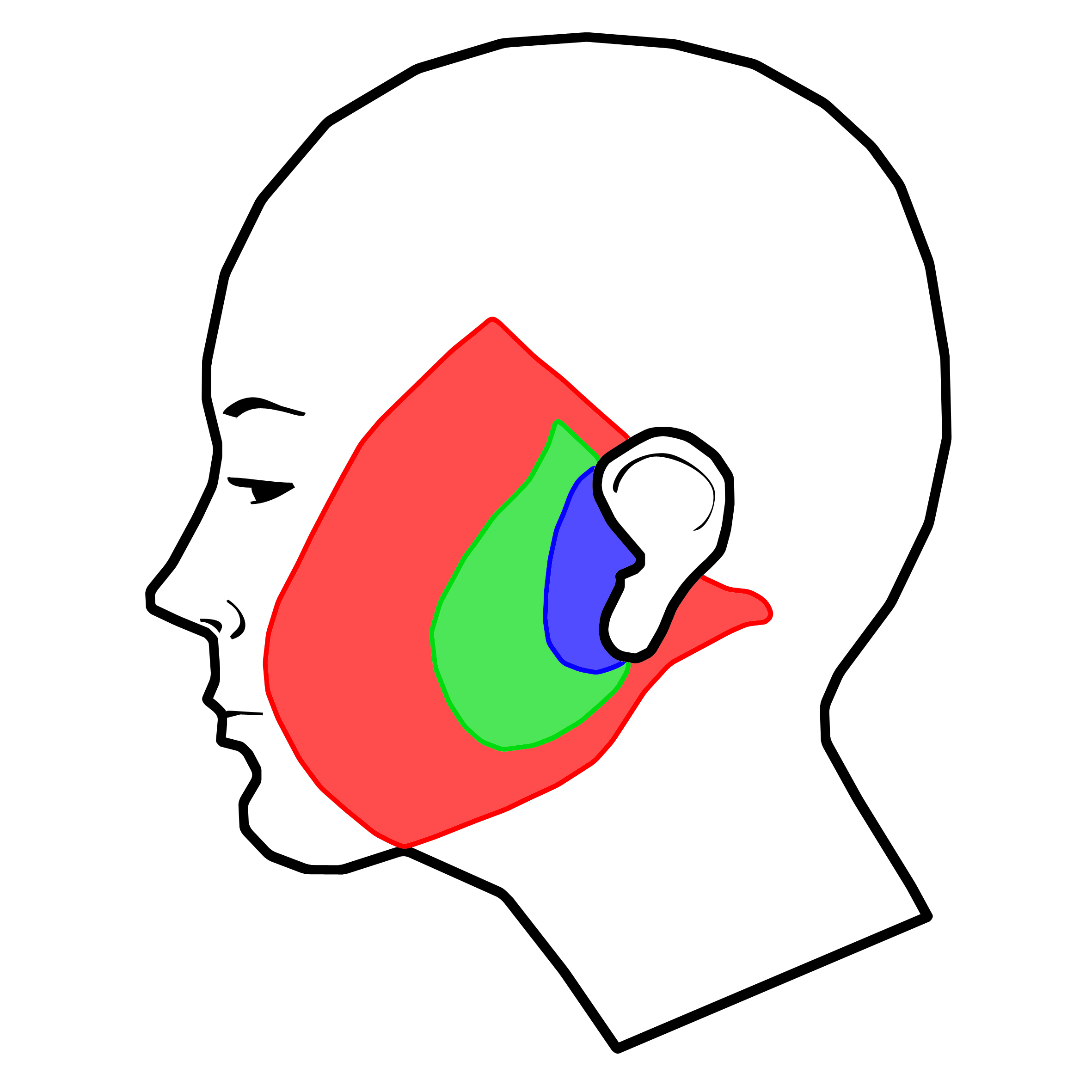
Blue represents the incisions in the Skin only facelift. Green represents the S-lift. Red is the extensive undermining done in several facelift techniques.

=== Subperiosteal facelift ===
The subperiosteal facelift technique is done by vertically lifting the soft tissues of the face, completely separating it from the underlying facial bones and elevating it to a more esthetically pleasing position, correcting deep nasolabial folds and sagging cheeks. The technique is often combined with standard techniques, which provide a long-lasting rejuvenation of the face and is done in all age groups. The difference between this and other lifts is that the subperiosteal facelift has a longer period of facial swelling after the procedure.

=== Skin-only facelift ===
With the skin-only facelift only the skin of the face is lifted and not the underlying SMAS, muscles or other structures. As the elastin fibers disintegrate, the skin itself loses elasticity in older patients. A skin only face lift requires skill in understanding the extent of safe removal of skin and the vector of pull to get an optimal result. It can be done with a simple ellipse of skin removed with minimal undermining of skin flaps or more extensively with large skin flaps. It can last 5 to 10 years but some patients may want a touch-up at 6 to 12 months after the procedure. The reason that this option is considered is that it has fewer complications and quicker recovery. One of the fathers of plastic surgery Sir Harold Gilles described a simple ellipse of skin excision in a socialite who was pleased with her quick recovery and outcome. Can be done for a simple jowl lift in a 35- to 45-year-old patient.

=== Thread lift ===
A technique called thread lift or non-surgical face lift simplifies the operation. Silicone threads with barbs are used to pull the face and neck skin upwards without the need of skin excision. These are non-absorbable threads and combination of these threads with other methods of facial rejuvenation reveals even better results. One such procedure is thread-lift with anti-ptosis (APTOS) sutures.

In the UK aesthetic practitioners—who administer thread lifts and other treatments—are not required to have any mandatory qualifications, although some treatments can cause serious complications. In Liverpool the BBC found 26 cosmetic training academies offering courses ranging in price from £150 to £5,000 in 2021, lasting from a couple of hours online to a couple of days of face-to-face training. A professionally trained cosmetic doctor, Vincent Wong, said that a thread lift is the most dangerous procedure an aesthetic practitioner can do. A great many things can go wrong, more so than any injectable treatment, because threads stay in the skin and cannot be pulled out; while the results can be very good, the procedure can also cause irreversible damage. The professional training of Wong—already a physician with a degree in surgery—in this procedure involved four courses over three months.

A nurse sent undercover by the BBC to take and secretly film a course teaching thread lifting was shocked at the unprofessionalism and unsafe practices she was taught. While exceptional sterility is required to avoid possible long-term infection, there was no attempt to control infection. The tutor touched various objects and then the patient's face, and the procedure was carried out on a chair instead of a clean bed. Several blood vessels were accidentally punctured, and the patient was clearly in severe pain. Patients drank alcohol before the treatment and vaped during it. Ashton Collins, the director of Save Face, a national register of accredited medical practitioners that provide non-surgical cosmetic treatments, said that "there's no doubt that if people following that course go on to do treatments [it] will cause a lot of complications".

=== MACS facelift ===
The term MACS-lift – or Minimal Access Cranial Suspension lift – allows for the correction of sagging facial features through a short, minimal incision, elevating them vertically by suspending them from above. There are many advantages to having a MACS facelift versus a traditional facelift. For starters, the MACS-lift uses a shorter scar that is in front of the ear, instead of behind, which is much easier to hide. Overall, the MACS-lift surgery is safer because less skin is raised. This means that there is less risk of bleeding and nerve damage. The operation also takes less time, lasting 2.5 hours instead of the 3.5 hours that the traditional facelift requires. There is also a shorter recovery period, 2–3 weeks instead of 3–4 weeks. The MACS lift has been successfully used for to correct complication after thread-lift with APTOS.

== Complications ==
The most common complication is bleeding which usually requires a return to the operating room. Less common, but potentially serious, complications may include damage to the facial nerves and necrosis of the skin flaps or infection. Although the facial plastic surgeon attempts to prevent and minimise the risk of complications, a rhytidectomy can have complications. As a risk to every operation, complications can be derived as a reaction to the anesthetics.

Hematoma is the most seen complication after rhytidectomy. Arterial bleeding can cause the most dangerous hematomas, as they can lead to dyspnea. Almost all of the hematomas occur within the first 24 hours after the rhytidectomy.

Nerve injury can be sustained during rhytidectomy. This kind of injury can be temporary or permanent and harm can be done to either sensory or motor nerves of the face. As a sensory nerve, the great auricular nerve is the most common nerve to get injured at a facelift procedure. The most injured motor nerve is the facial nerve.

Skin necrosis can occur after a facelift operation. Smoking increases the risk of skin necrosis 12-fold. Scarring is considered a complication of facelift surgery. Hypertrophic scars can appear. A facelift requires skin incisions; however, the incisions in front of and behind the ear are usually inconspicuous.

Hair loss in the portions of the incision within the hair-bearing scalp can rarely occur. A distortion of the hairline—and facial hair in men—can result after a rhytidectomy. There is a high incidence of alopecia after rhytidectomy. The permanent hair loss is mostly seen at the incision site in the temporal areas. In men, the sideburns can be pulled backwards and upwards, resulting in an unnatural appearance if appropriate techniques are not employed to address this issue. Achieving a natural appearance following surgery in men can be more challenging due to their hair-bearing preauricular skin. In both men and women, one of the signs of having had a facelift can be an earlobe which is pulled forwards and/or distorted. If too much skin is removed, or a more vertical vector not employed, the face can assume a pulled-back, "windswept" appearance. This appearance can also be due to changes in bone structure that generally happen with age.[2]

One of the most often overlooked (or not discussed) areas of a traditional facelift procedure is the effects on the anatomical positioning and angles of the ears. Most patients are, in many cases, not made aware that the vector forces in a facelift will lower the ears as well as change the angle of the ears. Ear lowering can be as much as 1 cm and change in the angle as much as 10 degrees.

Infection is a rare complication for patients who have undergone a rhytidectomy. Staphylococcus is the most usual causative organism for an infection after facelift surgery.

== See also ==
- Cosmetic surgery
- Facial toning
- Micro-current treatment ("non-surgical" facelift)
- Lifestyle lift
- Minimal access cranial suspension
- Oral and maxillofacial surgery
- Otolaryngology
- Plastic surgery
- Superficial muscular aponeurotic system
