= Lifestyle Lift =

Facial cosmetic surgery practice

- Industry: Cosmetic surgery, facial surgery
- Founder: Dr. David Kent
- Headquarters: Troy, Michigan, United States
- Number of locations: 50 affiliated offices around the United States
- Number of employees: >100 physicians
- Website: Closed March 2015 www.lifestylelift.com

Lifestyle Lift (stylized in uppercase in its logo) was a national facial cosmetic surgery practice with headquarters in Troy, Michigan, United States. The company's name in all caps is a trademarked brand name used to market a particular type of facial surgery called the lifestyle lift. In 2012, Debby Boone became the spokesperson for the company in its television commercials and its half-hour infomercial. The company discontinued using Boone in late 2013 shifting to a new advertising campaign. The company abruptly closed all its offices in early March 2015 and announced its intention to declare bankruptcy.

The procedure is advertised as a minimally invasive, short-flap face lift performed under local anesthesia. The procedure involves the excess skin and superficial muscular aponeurotic system (SMAS) layer.

== Company history ==
Lifestyle Lift was founded by Dr. David Kent, whose previous medical practice focused on otolaryngology head and neck surgery, facial plastic surgery and hair replacement. Kent completed an osteopathic residency in otolaryngology-head and neck surgery and facial plastic surgery. He is a member of the American Academy of Facial Plastic and Reconstructive Surgery and board certified by the American Osteopathic College of Otolaryngology - Head and Neck Surgery. Kent was recently named Ernst & Young's 2012 Entrepreneur of the Year. He started Lifestyle Lift in 2001 with one office and has grown it to over 50 surgical, consultation and affiliated offices with more than 100 physicians. R. James Koch joined Lifestyle Lift in 2006 as medical director and oversaw medical training for the company. Prior to joining Lifestyle Lift, Koch was a full-time faculty member at the Stanford University School of Medicine where he served as associate professor, co-director of the Division of Facial Plastic Surgery, and co-director of the Fellowship for Advanced Facial Plastic & Reconstructive Surgery. Koch resigned from the organization in 2010 and was replaced by three regional medical directors that same year and who were subsequently named medical directors in 2012: David Santos, Pacific and Mountain Regions; Jason Swerdloff, Southeast and Northeast Regions; Carlos Farias, Midwest and Northeast Regions. The company closed its operations and filed for bankruptcy on March 2, 2015.

== Claims ==
The company website lists 172,255 completed surgeries as of 5 February 2014. There are almost 200 reviews of the company out of over 150,000 customers—some of them negative—on RealSelf.com, which Lifestyle Lift sued for trademark infringement (the case was settled). Lifestyle Lift has attempted to sue other companies based on trademark infringement, including informercialscams.com (now defunct). In 2008, Lifestyle Lift was the subject of an eight-part mini-series by the CBS affiliate in Atlanta featuring three dissatisfied Lifestyle Lift patients, and former employees and their complaints against the company. In 2009, a Florida woman died just hours after undergoing a cosmetic facial surgery at a Lifestyle Lift center in Maitland, Florida.

== Malpractice claims ==
Lifestyle Lift® and/or its doctors have been the subject of multiple alleged malpractice claims in the state of Florida.

== Complaints ==
=== Marketing practices ===
In 2009 Lifestyle Lift reached a settlement with New York state over claims it had posted false customer endorsements on third-party websites, including RealSelf.com, and on some websites the company had created for the purpose. Lifestyle Lift was ordered to pay $300,000 to the state, and it agreed to cease the practice. In 2013, after a three-year review of all aspects of Lifestyle Lift marketing, the Florida Attorney General found that Lifestyle Lift was compliant with all state regulations. As a result, no fines were levied, but Lifestyle Lift reimbursed the State of Florida for costs of the investigation and made a donation to a Florida Attorney General sponsored charity. During the course of the investigation, Lifestyle Lift voluntarily made several minor changes to its marketing materials to ensure clarity for consumers.

=== Safety issues ===
In 2008, an Orlando, Florida, plastic surgeon filed a complaint with the Florida Board of Medicine, seeking payment for emergency room services he provided to a Lifestyle Lift patient; the company denied that it was negligent. Lifestyle Lift was also the subject of a March 2010 lawsuit filed by the family of a Massachusetts patient who died as a result of complications with local anesthesia in July 2009. The suit alleged that doctors failed to monitor the woman's vital signs during the procedure; in a statement, Lifestyle Lift responded that the woman had failed to disclose pertinent medical information. In an August 2011 lawsuit filed in Broward County, Florida, a patient claimed she developed keloid scars within days following a Lifestyle Lift facelift, and that the doctor had lied about the risks of scarring. In a statement to the press, Lifestyle Lift indicated disagreement with the "accounting of events" described in the suit, and said it remained supportive of its surgeon.

== Procedure ==
The procedure involves an incision made along the temple hairline and continuing down around the front of the ear or following the natural curves of the ear. The typical incision makes an S shape although the incision length and type can differ between surgeons and is individualized for each patient. The incision is made in front of and behind each ear. Once these cuts are made, the deeper muscle or SMAS tissue is pulled up and back (and possibly trimmed) and sutured into place. The excess skin is then trimmed off and the incision is closed. Liposuction may be used to reduce fat from under the chin. In addition, the muscle bands in the neck may be sutured together to lessen their appearance. Lifestyle Lift surgeons also perform eyelid surgeries, brow lifting, fractional CO_{2} laser skin resurfacing, fat grafting, and chin augmentation.

== See also ==
- Rhytidectomy
