= Auricular nerve =

Auricular nerve may refer to:

- Lesser auricular nerve, originates from the cervical plexus, composed of branches of spinal nerves C2 and C3
- Posterior auricular nerve, arises from the facial nerve close to the stylomastoid foramen and runs upward in front of the mastoid process
- Great auricular nerve, originates from the cervical plexus, composed of branches of spinal nerves C2 and C3.
- Or any of the auricular branches
