= Minimal-access cranial suspension =

- Specialty: Plastic surgeon

Minimal-access cranial suspension is a form of facial surgery or rhytidectomy used to reduce wrinkles and lift sagging facial tissue and originally developed in Belgium. Facial tissues are accessed via an incision before the ear. Sutures are then used to lift the underlying tissue. These sutures are then anchored to the deep temporal fascia with purse-string sutures.

== See also ==
- Cosmetic surgery
- Otolaryngology
- Maxillofacial surgery
- Plastic surgery
- Rhytidectomy
- Superficial muscular aponeurotic system (SMAS)
