= Nasolabial groove =

Nasolabial groove may refer to:

- Nasolabial fold, a fold between the nose and mouth of humans
- Nasolabial groove, an olfactory structure found in lungless salamanders
