= Barney Harford =

British-American technology executive

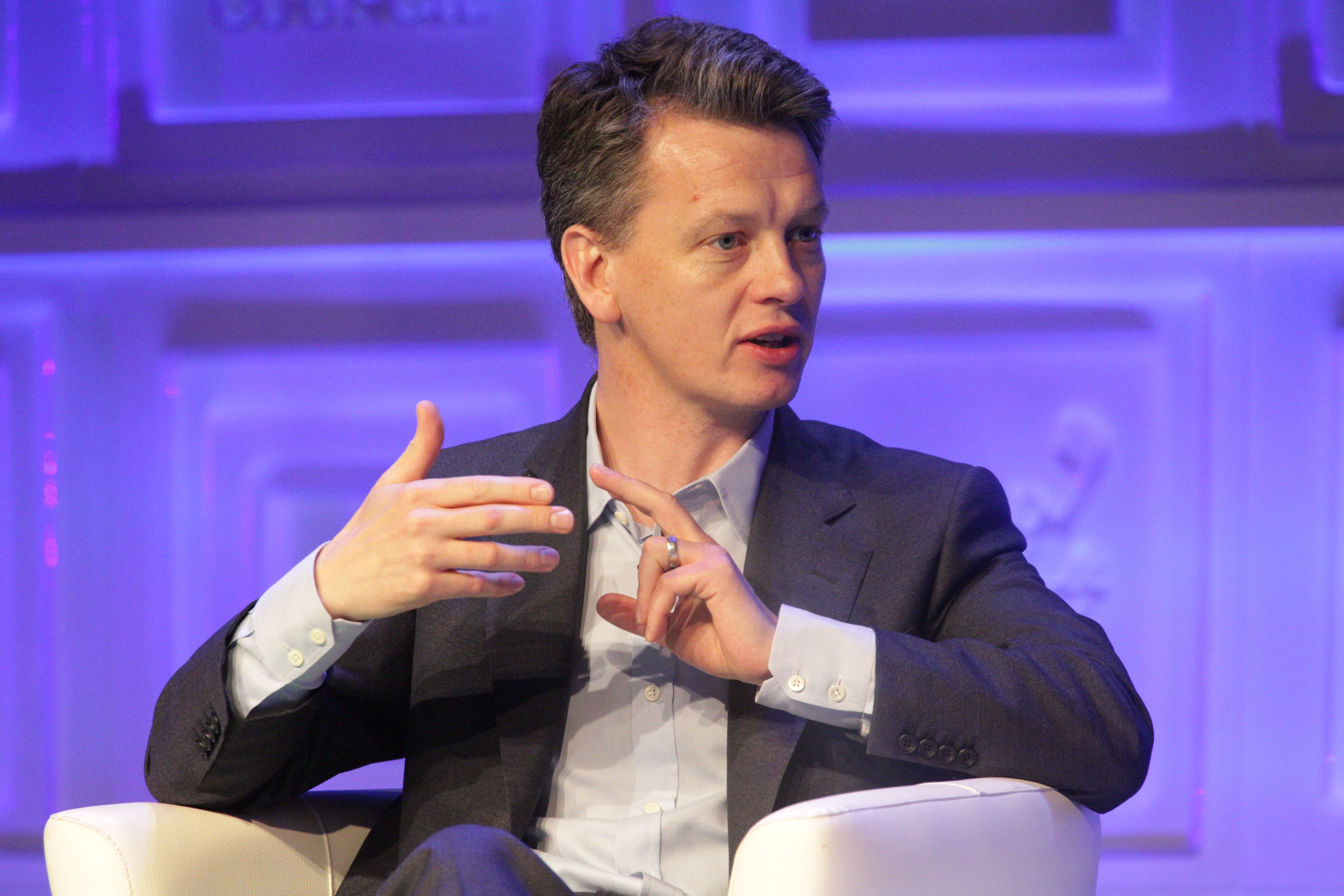
- Born: 1972 (age 53–54); Greenwich, England
- Education: Clare College, Cambridge; INSEAD, MBA
- Spouse: Alexandra Birnbaum
- Children: 1
- Parent: Lindsay S. Harford; Ian G. M. Harford

Barney Merrick Harford (born 1972) is a British–American technology executive. Harford is a member of the board of directors for United Airlines and RealSelf.

== Biography ==
=== Early life and family ===
Harford was born in Greenwich, England, and raised in Manchester. He has a sister who is three years younger. His mother, Lindsay S. Harford, was the director of planning and development at the Learning and Skills Council in Cumbria. His father, Ian G. M. Harford was the regional director in Manchester of the Workers’ Educational Association, which provides adult vocational and other courses. When he was young, he wanted to be a travel photographer or a physicist. Harford was educated at Manchester Grammar School. He took a year off between high school and college, when he worked for a nuclear power company, using ultrasound to find cracks in power stations and also learned the French language and was a ski instructor in the French Alps.

Harford graduated from Clare College, Cambridge with a degree in major in natural sciences. He applied for graduate school after a paragliding accident and then received an MBA from INSEAD, near Paris, in a one-year program.

=== Career ===
After graduating, Harford was a finalist for a job at Mars, Incorporated but was turned down for asking too many questions. He instead took a job as a business strategy consultant in London.

In 1999, at age 26, he received a job as a product planner at Expedia, an online travel agency then owned by Microsoft. He built Expedia's private-label business, in which Expedia was the platform for other websites. He ran Expedia's telephone sales business and in 2004, he was named president of Expedia Asia Pacific and led the company into Australia, Japan, and China. In 2008, he became an adviser to Kayak.com.

In 2009, he joined Orbitz as CEO and was involved in the sale of Orbitz to Expedia in 2015 for $1.6 billion.

In 2017, Harford was named chief operating officer of Uber. In 2018, he received $47.6 million in compensation. He left Uber in June 2019.

== Controversies ==
In 2018, Harford commented that two black women in an advertisement looked the same because of their haircuts. Harford later told colleagues that he regretted his phrasing but was said to have made other similar comments about women and minorities.

== Personal life ==
Harford is married to Expedia executive Alexandra Birnbaum. They live in Chicago and have a son. Harford is an adventure traveler and enjoys mountaineering and kite surfing in remote locations.
