= Risorius =

Facial muscle

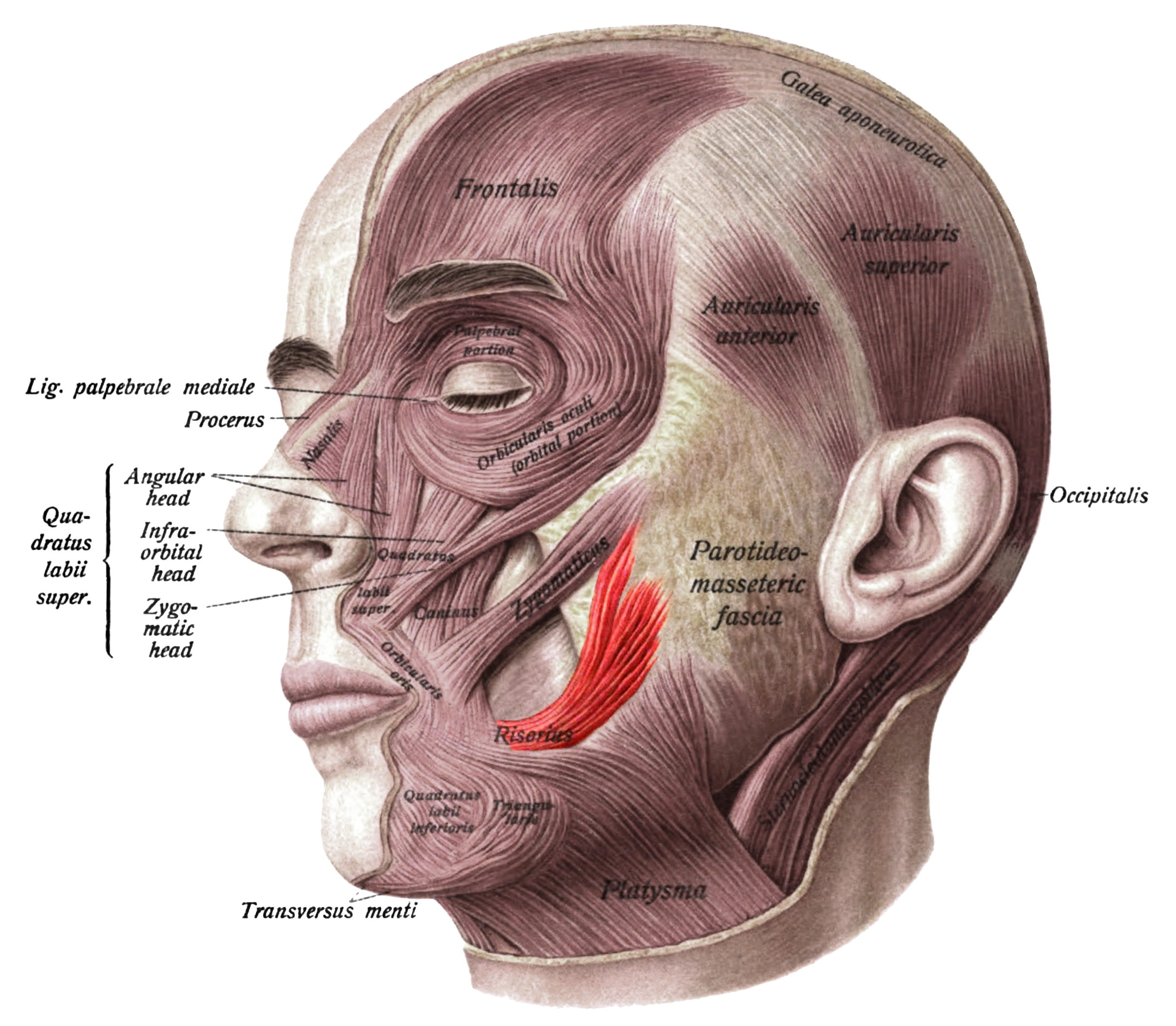
- Superficial muscles of the head and neck, showing the risorius in red. This version of the muscle does not match that shown in most sources.

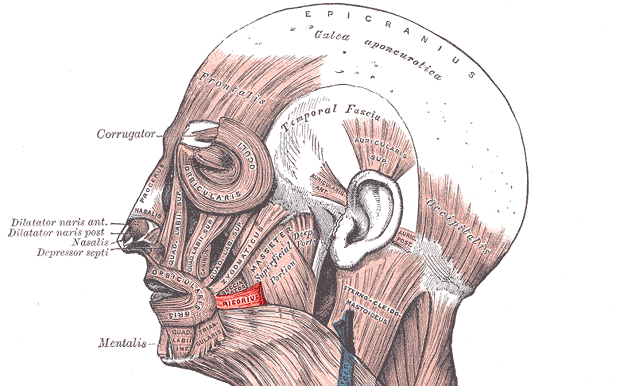
- Muscles of the head, face, and neck. Risorius shown in red. This is the most standard version of the direction and origin of the muscle.

Details
- Origin: Parotid fascia
- Insertion: Modiolus
- Artery: Facial artery
- Nerve: Buccal branch of the facial nerve
- Actions: Draws back angle of mouth

Identifiers
- Latin: musculus risorius
- TA98: A04.1.03.028
- TA2: 2078
- FMA: 46838

The risorius muscle is a highly variable muscle of facial expression. It has numerous and very variable origins, and inserts into the angle of the mouth. It receives motor innervation from branches of facial nerve (CN VII). It may be absent or asymmetrical in some people. It pulls the angle of the mouth sidewise, such as during smiling.

== Structure ==
The risorius muscle is highly variable.

=== Attachments ===
Its peripheral attachments may include (some or all of): the parotid fascia, masseteric fascia, the fascia enveloping the pars modiolaris of the platysma muscle, fascia overlying the mastoid part of temporal bone, and/or the zygomatic arch.

Its apical and subapical (i.e. convergent) attachment is at the modiolus.

=== Innervation ===
The risorius receives motor innervation from the buccal branch of the facial nerve (CN VII).

=== Vasculature ===
The risorius receives arterial supply mostly from the superior labial artery.

=== Variation ===
The risorius muscle is highly variable. It ranges in form from one or more slender bundles to a wide (yet thin) fan. It may be absent in a significant minority of people, and may be asymmetrical.

=== Relations ===
It is superficial to the masseter muscle, partially overlying it.

== Function ==
The risorius muscle draws the angle of the mouth lateral-ward. It participates in producing facial expressions like a smile, grin, or laugh.

== Clinical significance ==
Because it partially overlies the masseter muscle, it may be unintentionally affected during botox injections, resulting in unnatural facial expressions.

== Other animals ==
It has been suggested that the risorius muscle is only found in Homininae (African great apes and humans).

== Etymology ==
From the Latin rīsor ("laugher, mocker") + -ius (adjectival suffix), literally, "the laughing muscle".

== Additional images ==
Position of risorius.
