= Superficial parotid lymph nodes =

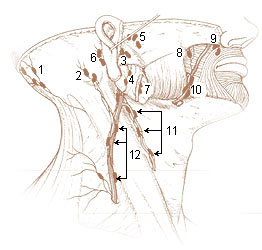
- 3. Superficial Parotid

Details
- System: Lymphatic system

Identifiers
- Latin: nodi lymphoidei parotidei superficiales

The superficial parotid lymph nodes or paraparotid lymph nodes are a group of lymph nodes of the head situated superficial to either parotid gland (either superficial to or deep to the parotid fascia). They may sometimes be grouped together with the anterior auricular lymph glands. They are situated just anterior to the tragus of the ear.

== Territory ==
=== Afferents ===
These lymph nodes receive lymph from more lateral parts of the forehead and from the temporal and zygomatic region, the superior portion of the lateral auricular aspect and anterior wall of the external auditory meatus, and eyelids.

=== Efferents ===
Superficial parotid lymph nodes in turn empty into the superior deep cervical lymph nodes.
