= Classification of peripheral nerves =

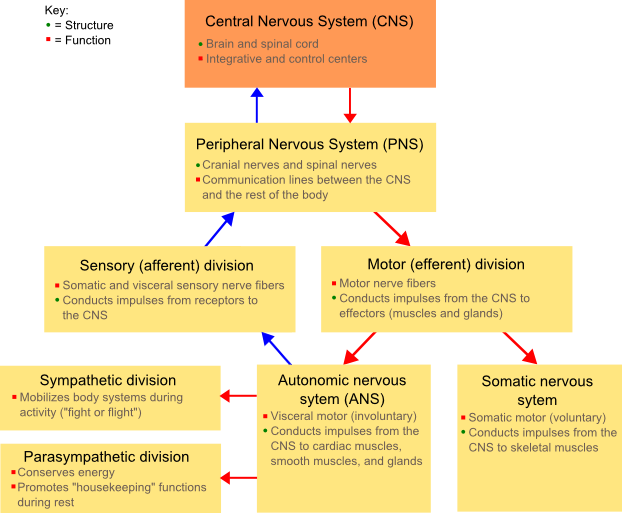
Peripheral nervous system box diagram

The classification of peripheral nerves in the peripheral nervous system (PNS) groups the nerves into two main groups, the somatic and the autonomic nervous systems. Together, these two systems provide information regarding the location and status of the limbs, organs, and the remainder of the body to the central nervous system (CNS) via nerves and ganglia present outside of the spinal cord and brain. The somatic nervous system directs all voluntary movements of the skeletal muscles, and can be sub-divided into afferent and efferent neuronal flow. The autonomic nervous system is divided primarily into the sympathetic and parasympathetic nervous systems with a third system, the enteric nervous system, receiving less recognition.

== Autonomic nervous system ==
=== History ===
In 1898, British scientist John Newport Langley first coined the term "autonomic" in classifying the connections of nerve fibers to peripheral nerve cells. Previous researchers had utilized different terms such as "the sympathetic nerves" [Winslow et al.] to describe the way in which neurons in one part of the body brought about sympathetic reactions in another part of the body, as well as the "ganglionic nerves and ganglionic nervous system" [Livingstone et al.] for the ganglionic conversion of voluntary to involuntary movements (which supposedly made these peripheral nerves 'ganglionic nerves'), among other classifications. Langley stated that his choice of autonomic was not intended to imply a special degree of independence for the cells at hand, but rather to demarcate a clear departure from previous nomenclature because his hypothesis, while incorporating much previous research, was largely distinct from his predecessors.

Langley rejected that the sympathetic nerves possessed a particular relationship to the 'sympathies,' and aptly pointed out that the presence of ganglial nerves in both the spinal cord and cranium made the 'ganglionic' connections of the peripheral nerves a pointless, if not misleading, term. Instead, he noted that the sympathetic neurons that innervated the entire body tended to have opposing functions to the other autonomic neurons of the tectal and bulbo-sacral regions. The latter two, tectal and bulbo-sacral, were grouped together to form the parasympathetic system because they tended to respond in a like manner to various drugs. Langley also mentions an enteric nervous system in his writing, but this third grouping has largely fallen out of discussion in modern practice.

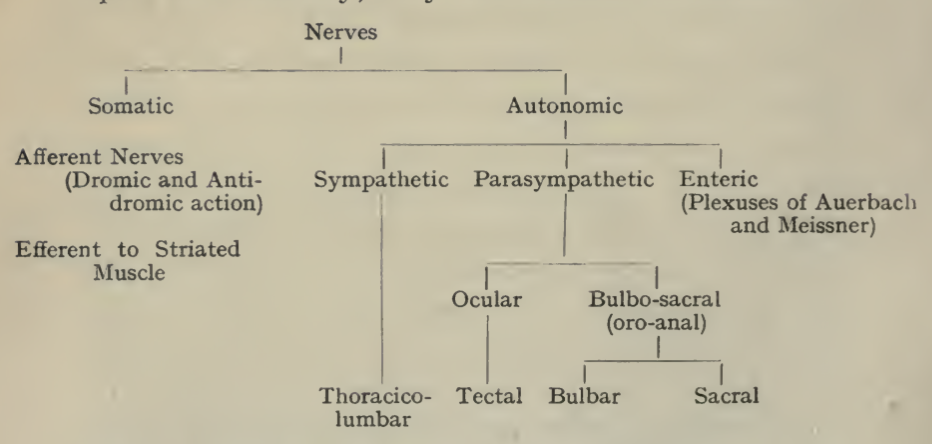
Langley's Classification Tree from his 1921 book The Autonomic Nervous System

=== Classification techniques ===
==== Traditional techniques ====
Much of the original nerve classification done by Langley, and Gaskell by extension, was based on pharmacological responses of nerves throughout the body as well as the gross anatomical similarities of nerves. For example, adrenaline was demonstrated to elicit the same bodily effects as direct electrical stimulation of the sympathetic neurons, and other classes of drugs likewise elicited responses that were contained to the parasympathetic neurons. The sympathetic nervous system's responsiveness to adrenaline, in particular, lead to the system's association with the 'fight or flight' response of humans, although this is an oversimplification of the roles played by the SNS. These two distinct classifications were further supported by differences in the location of the ganglionic synapses. Since the time of Langley's unified proposal in the 1920s, these divisions have remained relatively constant; the parasympathetic nervous system is known to regulate unconscious activities of the body and maintain homeostasis, the sympathetic nervous system controls responses to external stimuli, but both are involuntary functions. Langley also described an enteric nervous system although it has received minimal attention, and most modern textbooks tend to only mention the sympathetic and parasympathetic pathways in the context of the autonomic nervous system.

==== Modern techniques ====
The nerve classifications of the autonomic nervous system created by the traditional methodologies have remained mostly unchanged over the last 100 years. However, modern perspectives have placed more of an emphasis on the developmental and molecular mechanisms of these systems. As such, more attention has been paid to elements such as gene expression, development features, and overall functions of these neurons. The classification of the sacral outflow as parasympathetic, in particular, has come under some scrutiny as of 2016.

Isabel Espinosa-Medina, working in the lab of French researcher Jean-François Brunet at IBENS, identified several transcription factors within pre-ganglionic neurons of the lower lumbar and sacral regions that are essential to neurogenesis. These transcription factors were only identified within other portions of the spinal cord, but they were not co-expressed in the developing cranium. This genomic similarity of the lumbrasacral region to the rest of the spinal cord lead to the conclusion that the sacral region of the spinal cord may actually be part of the sympathetic nervous system. The effect of this revision produces a simple bisection of the autonomic nervous system wherein the cranium is solely parasympathetic, and the spinal cord is solely sympathetic.

Other researchers in the field have challenged this assertion. A publication out of the lab of German researcher Wilfrid Jänig claims that this reclassification would be a 'mistake.' Among the arguments made by Jänig et al. is a disagreement with the developmental research approach taken by Espinosa-Medina. Jänig et al. argue that many of the measured gene markers from Espinosa-Medina are only expressed transiently in the lumbrasacral region to assist in migration and differentiation of these cells. As such, these nerves necessarily share expression similarities with their neighboring sympathetic spinal nerves, but that alone does not make the nerves anything more than spinal in nature. Furthermore, Jänig et al. state that this reclassification would contradict information on the opposing actions of the pelvic ganglia's parasympathetic and sympathetic pathways.

=== Sympathetic and parasympathetic divisions ===
Disregarding the current debate of changing the sacral outflow from parasympathetic to sympathetic, the divisions of the two systems are fairly straightforward; the sympathetic system encompasses those peripheral nerves that synapse along the thoracolumbar region of the spine (roughly vertebrae T1-L3) whereas the parasympathetic system covers peripheral nerve synapses in the vertebrae regions of T12-S4 in addition to a number of cranial nerves. As can be noticed from this description, there is a slight overlap of these divisions in the lowest region of the thoracic spine as well as throughout the lumbar spine region. This overlap is a result of some directly opposing functions of the sympathetic and parasympathetic systems in regulating the stomach region. The relationship is further detailed in the diagrams below.

Autonomic spinal cord divisions

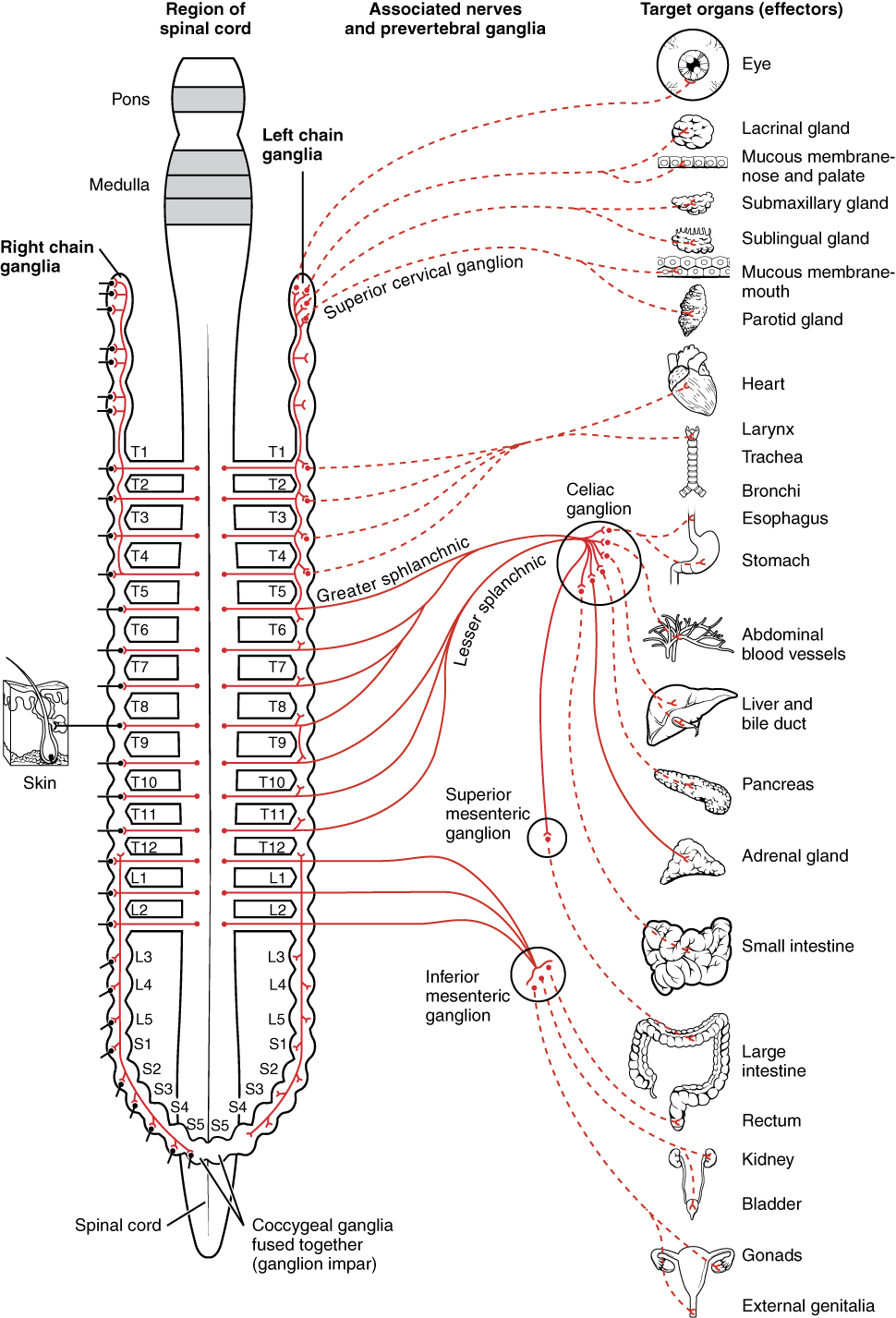
Innvervations of the sympathetic nervous system

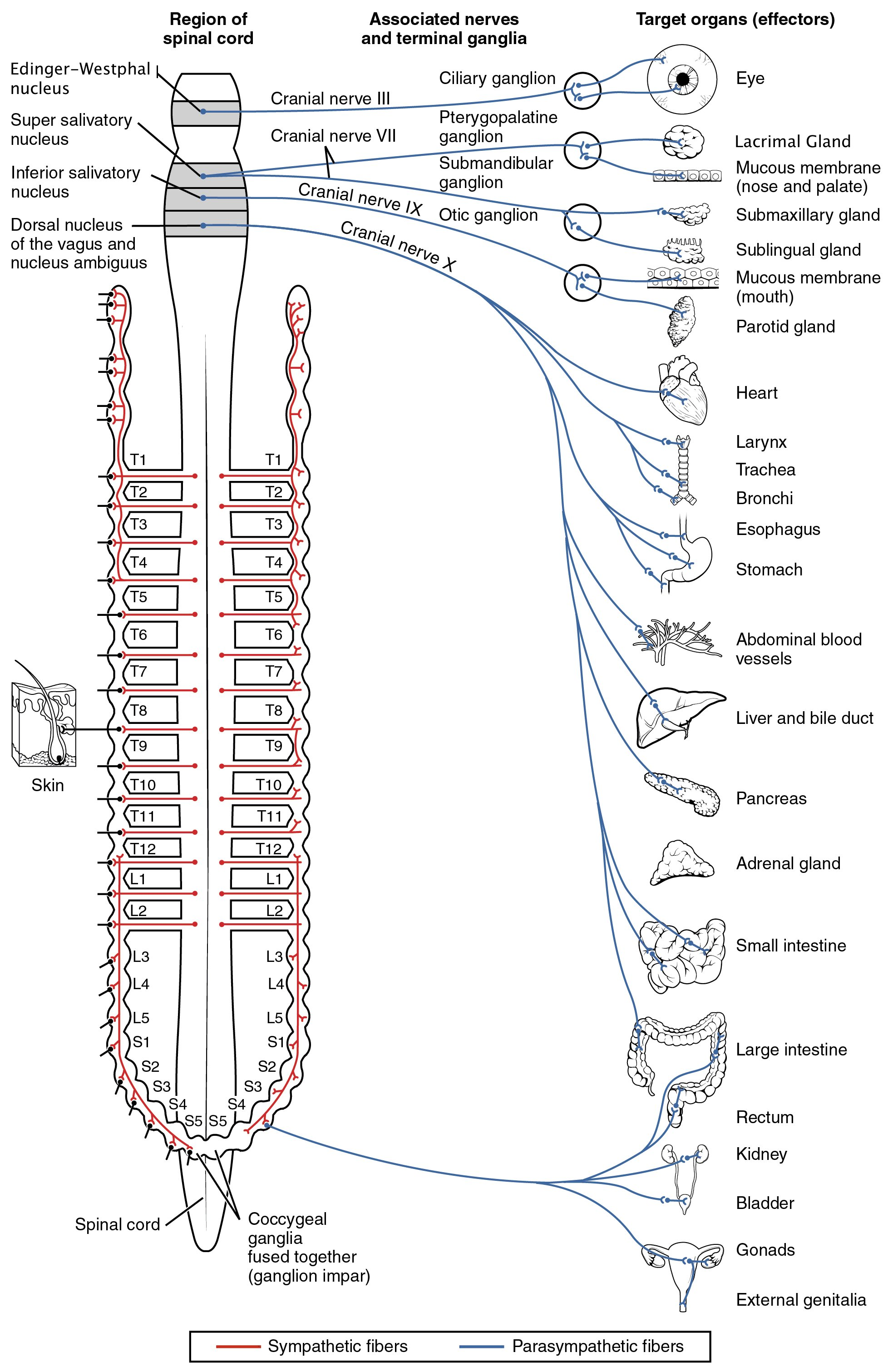
Innervations of the parasympathetic nervous system

=== Classification implications ===
The division of the autonomic nervous system into sympathetic and parasympathetic pathways is particularly useful from a medical treatment perspective [source]. Jänig et al. warn that changing the classifications of the systems could result in confusion on how to treat some disease, particularly those of the gut and stomach region.
