= RealSelf =

American healthcare marketplace

- Company type: Private
- Website type: Review Site
- Founded: 2006
- Headquarters: New York, New York
- CEO: Minou Clark
- Key people: Founder & Executive Chairman: Tom Seery; Board Members: Andrew Hunt, Judy Verses, Mike Slade, José Luis Ferrer; CFO: Ende Li
- Industry: Beauty
- Services: Health information services
- Employees: 46 (January 2025)
- Website: realself.com
- Registration: Optional
- Current status: Active

RealSelf is an American healthcare marketplace where consumers research aesthetic treatments and connect with physicians. The website primarily targets plastic surgery, dermatology and minimally-invasive treatments. There are 30,000 registered doctors and practices. The site has more than 2 million reviews and had 94 million visitors in 2017. RealSelf’s website has been compared in the media to Yelp, Avvo, and TripAdvisor due to its emphasis on user-generated content and connecting consumers to businesses through its marketplace.

== History ==
RealSelf was founded in 2006 by Tom Seery, a former executive at Expedia. Seery told Geekwire he noticed a gap in the market where consumers could find quality information about travel-related businesses but minimal, "one-sided marketing" about expensive medical procedures.

RealSelf was initially self-funded by Seery. In 2008, the company raised close to $2 million in funding from angel investors, including Rich Barton. RealSelf was one of Inc. 500's fastest growing private companies from 2012–2015, peaking at #306. Traffic rose 270% from 2013 to 2019.

In 2018, the company raised $40 million in Series C funding from Elephant.

In 2025, the company moved their headquarters to New York and announced a major rebrand. In Forbes, CEO Minou Clark called the new RealSelf a destination "built for the digital-first, culture-savvy, information-hungry generation."

== Site content ==
RealSelf.com is a website where viewers can review treatments and find a plastic surgeon or an aesthetics physician to perform procedures. RealSelf also covers topics in dermatology, dentistry, and even LASIK. The site features reviews, real patient before & after photos, forums, editorial content, consumer questions, and answers. Treatments are rated "Worth It", "Not Worth It", with an option to talk about their experience.

== Audience ==
=== Consumers ===
Consumers post reviews, photos, and questions in a discussion format, and also post questions to providers. RealSelf also hosts a directory of doctors organized by specialty, the treatment offered, and location. Consumers can contact doctors through the site, who sometimes have special offers available. RealSelf also had an iOS app but deprecated it in summer 2025.

The site has over 2 million reviews of doctors and treatments.

=== Doctors and Medical Practices ===
RealSelf operates on a commercial model and allows doctors with active, valid medical licenses to have a profile. Physicians must meet RealSelf's standards for board certification to claim a profile.

The American Board of Medical Specialties and its member boards are the agencies that award board certification once a doctor has completed a residency for a specialty or fellowship for a sub-specialty. Board certification does not mean the doctor has completed any plastic surgery training, but RealSelf lists each provider's official specialty and board certifications on their profile.

Doctors and practices (including plastic surgery centers, med spas, dermatology offices, and cosmetic dentistry practices) publicize their services through their profile, which aggregates their before and after photos, patient reviews, and answers to consumer questions. Doctors and practices can pay for targeted exposure through ads, which are labeled as "Sponsored."

All doctors with RealSelf profiles have access to free dispute resolution when they think a review violates the review guidelines. Doctors cannot pay to alter or remove consumer reviews.

== Organization ==
In September 2024, RealSelf announced the hiring of its first female CEO, Minou Clark, who will oversee its global operations.

RealSelf's founder, Tom Seery, still serves as Executive Chairman. Seery is a frequent speaker at conferences, including meetings of the Aesthetic and Anti-aging Medicine World Congress, the American Society for Aesthetic Plastic Surgery, IMCAS World Congress and the American Society of Plastic Surgeons. He is also on the advisory board of Buerck Center for Entrepreneurship at the University of Washington.

Board members include Andrew Hunt, founder of Warby Parker and Elephant; and Mike Slade of Second Avenue Partners, Judy Verses of Wiley & Sons, Lizette Williams of Facebook.

== Business model ==
RealSelf is a two-sided marketplace that is free for consumers. Registration is required to submit content. Medical professionals are only required to have a medical license to claim a free profile and can self-verify their qualifications and experience. Profiles can be upgraded via a paid membership. Medical professionals cannot achieve "Verified" status without prior payment to RealSelf.com. They may also buy advertising that appears on the site. All professionals on RealSelf must meet participation guidelines before they can be listed. They can only buy ads and post content in specialties where they hold qualifications. RealSelf refer to their doctors as "cosmetic doctors" as they may only have a medical license and are not recognized as plastic surgeons or any type of board-certified surgeon.

All reviews, questions and forums undergo moderation before they are posted. RealSelf does not allow doctors to remove consumer reviews. RealSelf does not publicize their moderation algorithm. Other review websites, such as Yelp and TripAdvisor, also do not publish their moderation algorithm, with Yelp stating to the Irish Times that "we don't disclose precise details about the recommendation software to prevent people from gaming the system."

== Awards ==
RealSelf is not accredited by the Better Business Bureau. The company has won workplace awards from Entrepreneur, Glassdoor, Puget Sound Business Journal, Geekwire and Seattle Business Magazine.

RealSelf releases a yearly Most Worth It list of procedures, RealSelf Hall of Fame, RealSelf 100 and RealSelf 500 awards for doctors. The awards are free and are based on ratings from consumers.

== Charity ==
RealSelf sponsors medical relief to Dehradun, India as part of their “Beyond Scars” partnership with ReSurge International. The trips primarily work to provide plastic and reconstructive work to burn patients, which affect 6-7M people in India annually. RealSelf employees have also volunteered at Camp Karma in India.

== See also ==
- Web MD
- Healthgrades
- Vitals
- Zocdoc
- CareDash
- Aesthetic medicine
- Ruli
