= Lesser auricular nerve =

Nerve of the head

Details

Identifiers
- Latin: Nervus auricularis minor

The lesser auricular nerve originates from the cervical plexus, composed of branches of spinal nerves C2 and C3.

Therefore, the "Great auricular nerve" is incorrectly named "Greater auricular nerve".

The Great auricular nerve runs posteriorly to the ear, and is "greater," since it provides most of the innervation to the ear: the back of the ear, front of the ear and earlobe. The rest is provided by the auriculotemporal nerve, which supplies the skin anterior to the external auditory meatus.
