= Marionette lines =

Facial feature

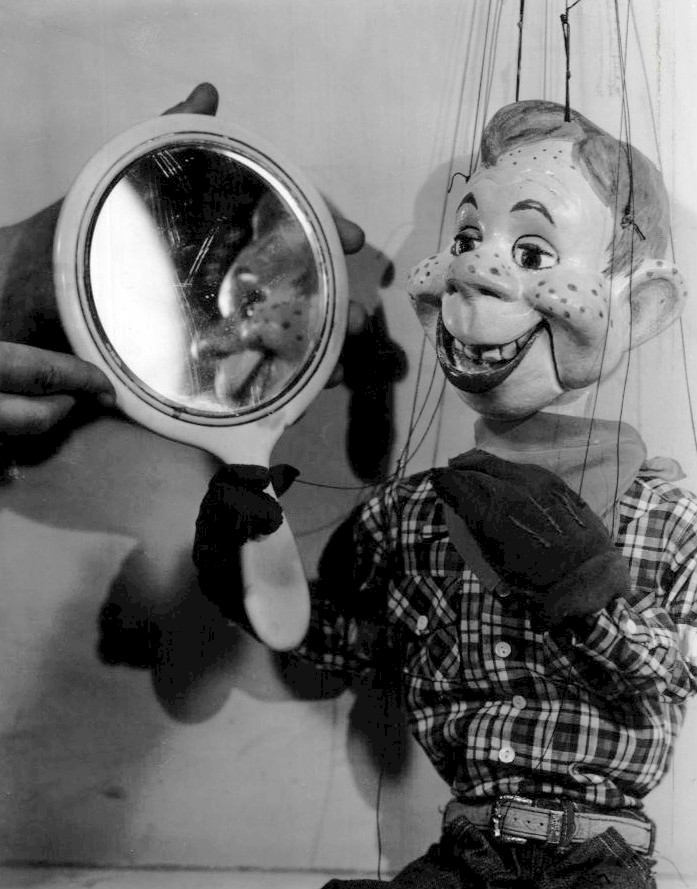
An illustration for the origin of the term

Marionette lines (melomental folds) are long vertical lines that laterally circumscribe the chin. They are important landmarks for the general impression of the face. Marionette lines appear with advancing age, but some people never get them, depending on facial structure and anatomy. They tend to appear as the ligaments around the mouth and chin relax and begin to loosen and sag, and fatty tissues of the cheek deflate and descend during the aging process. It can be difficult to get rid of them, but they can be minimized with facelifts that lift cheek tissue away from the area of the mouth combined with synthetic facial fillers, or with facial fillers alone.

== See also ==
- Nasolabial fold
