= Burn Advocates Network =

American nonprofit organization

- Founded: 2008
- Founder: Samuel Davis
- Type: Non-governmental organization
- Location: New Jersey, U.S.
- Region served: 6 countries
- Website: burnadvocates.org

The Burn Advocates Network (BAN) is a nonprofit organization established in 2008, dedicated to supporting burn survivors through their recovery, rehabilitation, and reintegration processes. The organization manages three pediatric burn camps and operates a network focused on burn care. BAN expanded its international activities in response to the 2010 Haiti earthquake, which resulted in approximately 1,000 individuals suffering from burns and lacking adequate care.

== Operations ==
Based in Teaneck, New Jersey, Burn Advocates Network operates three pediatric burn camps:

- Camp Sababa - Israel's first burn camp, was founded in 2009 and operates in cooperation with Schneider Hospital for Children. Camp takes place in Kfar Galim, a youth village outside of Haifa.
- Camp Karma - India's first burn camp, was founded in 2013 and operates in cooperation KEM Hospital. Camp takes place in Rivergate Resort, outside of Mumbai.
- Camp Samba - Launched in São Paulo in 2017.

Today there are approximately 60 burn camps worldwide, 31 of them based in the United States and registered at the International Association of Burn Camps. Burn camps typically include accommodation, offer various activities such as arts and crafts, cooking sessions and drumming circles, and are tuition-free for campers. The age of participants varies from 6-18 and the number of participants from 15 to 100. Several academic studies have demonstrated that burn survivors who participated in burn camps experienced decreased isolation, improved self-esteem and improved social skills.

BAN also initiated the DR & Haiti Burn Care Network, which seeks to improve burn care and treatment in the region. Since 2010, BAN has treated over 200 burn survivors through 6 medical missions, distributed over 50,000 tons of medical supplies and equipment, and sponsored several surgeons on medical exchange programs. In order to improve communication between aid workers and local victims, BAN launched the iOS app "French Creole for Aid Workers" in 2011.

== History ==
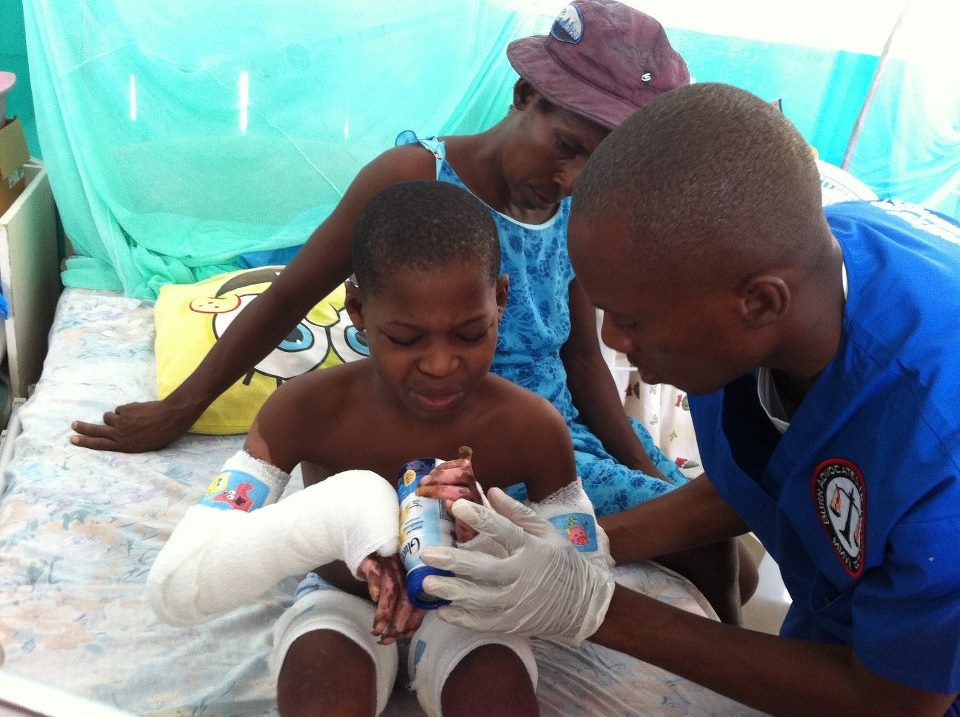
Medical mission, Haiti 2011

Founder Samuel Davis, trial lawyer and lecturer, has worked with burn survivors with serious injuries for over 30 years. After witnessing the positive effects of burn camps on his clients, he began sponsoring individual burn survivors from around the world. The local operation quickly expanded into an international organization, following the Haiti earthquake. In 2012, Samuel Davis received the Clarence Darrow Award for his ongoing philanthropic work.

== Funding ==
The organization is funded through private donations and fundraising events. By relying on volunteers and interns, BAN is able to keep its camps free for all participants.

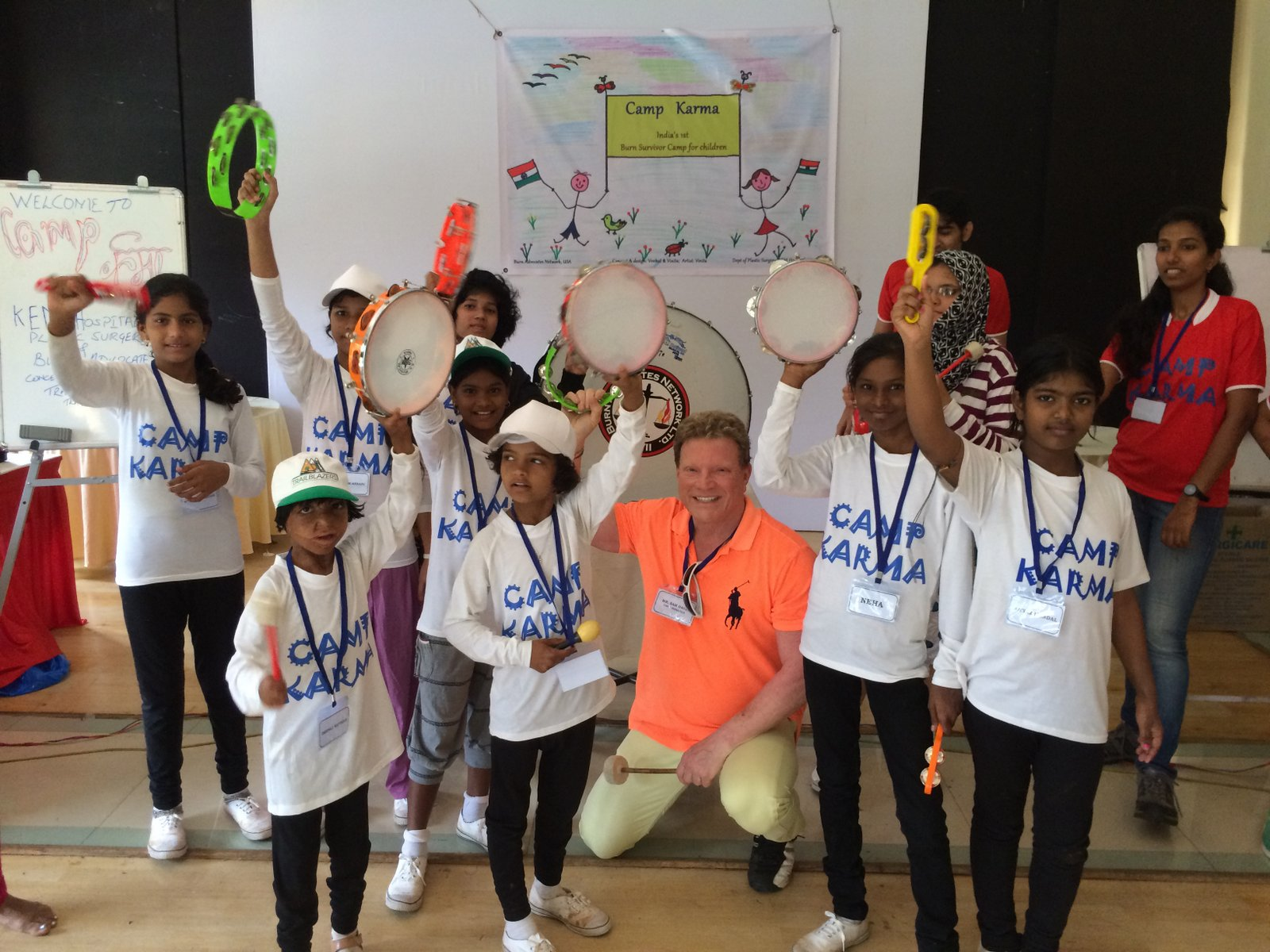
Camp Karma, India 2013
