= Superficial muscular aponeurotic system =

Group of facial muscles

Superficial muscular aponeurotic system (or superficial musculoaponeurotic system) (SMAS) is a thin yet tough unitary tissue plane of the face formed by facial fasciae, subcutaneous connective tissue, and facial muscles. Its composition varies, containing muscle fibres in some areas, and fibrous or fibroaponeurotic tissue in others. It connects to the dermis via vertical septations. It does not attach to bone. In most areas, a distinct plane can be defined deep to the SMAS (continuous with that formed between the platysma and underlying investing layer of deep cervical fascia).

Superiorly, the SMAS extends to the galea aponeurotica of the scalp, becoming continuous with temporoparietal fascia (at the zygomatic arch) and galea. It becomes continuous with the platysma muscle inferiorly (inferior to the inferior border of the mandible), and indistinct laterally (inferior to the zygomatic arch). Anteromedially, it blends with the epimysium of some facial muscles; a link between facial muscles and the skin of the face is thereby established, enabling facial expression. Over the parotid gland, the SMAS is firmly united with the superficial layer of parotid fascia.

== Clinical significance ==
The SMAS is clinically important in facial plastic surgery for rhytidectomy (facelift procedure). During this procedure, the SMAS is accessed through an arch-shaped incision anterior to the ear; a portion of the SMAS is then excised and the remaining SMAS is stretched by drawing it posterior-ward and suturing it, thus making the skin of the face which overlies the SMAS taut.
