= Parotid fascia =

Fascia enclosing parotid gland

Details

Identifiers
- Latin: Fascia parotidea
- TA98: A04.1.04.012
- TA2: 2137
- FMA: 76862

The parotid fascia (or parotid capsule) is a tough fascia enclosing the parotid gland. It has a superficial layer and a deep layer.

Current scientific knowledge regards the superficial layer to be continuous with the fascia of the platysma, and the deep layer to be derived from the deep cervical fascia.

Previously, both layers were thought to derive from the deep cervical fascia which was thought to form the parotid fascia by extending superior-ward and splitting into the superficial layer and deep layer. The superficial layer was traditionally described as attaching superiorly to the zygomatic process of the temporal bone, the cartilaginous portion of the external acoustic meatus, and the mastoid process of the temporal bone; the deep layer was described as attaching superiorly to the mandible, and the tympanic plate, styloid process and mastoid process of the temporal bone.

== Structure ==
The parotid fascia reduces in thickness anteroposteriorly; it is thick and fibrous anteriorly, while being thin, translucent and membranous posteriorly.

The parotid fascia extends anteriorly over the masseteric fascia as a separate layer; the two fasciae are separated by a cellular layer enclosing the branches of the facial nerve (CN VII) and the parotid duct.

The fascia issues many septa that passes among the lobules of glandular tissue.

=== Histology ===
The parotid fascia is histologically atypical in that it contains muscles fibres parallel to those of the platysma, particularly in its inferior portion.

=== Innervation ===
The great auricular nerve provides sensory innervation to the parotid fascia.

=== Relations ===
The external carotid artery pierces the deep lamina of the parotid fascia to enter the parotid gland and divide into its terminal branches within its substance of the gland.

The risorius muscle arises from the parotid fascia.

The superficial parotid lymph nodes are situated either just superficial to or just deep to the parotid fascia.
