= Masseteric fascia =

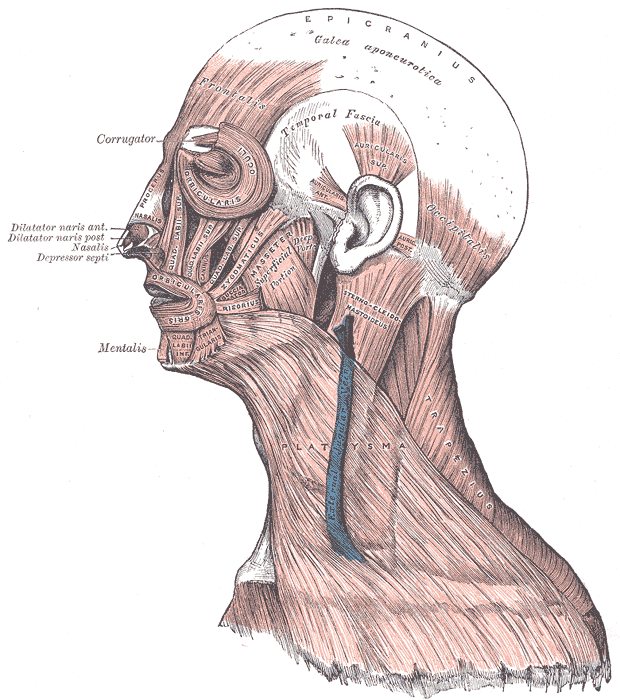
- Muscles of the head, face, and neck (masseter visible to left of ear)

Details

Identifiers
- Latin: fascia masseterica and/or fascia parotideomasseterica
- TA98: A04.1.04.011
- TA2: 2136
- FMA: 76861

The masseteric fascia and parotideomasseteric fascia (or masseteric-parotid fascia) are fascias of the head varyingly described depending upon the source consulted. They may or may not be described as one and the same structure.

== Descriptions ==
The 42nd edition of Gray's Anatomy (2020) describes a parotid-masseteric fascia as a thin and translucent yet tough fascia that covers the parotid duct, buccal branches of facial nerve (CN VII), and branches of the mandibular nerve where these structures lie upon the surface of the masseter muscle. Anteriorly, the fascia is said to overlie the buccal fat pad (that in turn overlies the buccinator muscle) before blending with the epimysium of the buccinator muscle; inferiorly, it is said to become continuous with the investing layer of deep cervical fascia inferior to the inferior margin of the mandible. The masseteric fascia is said to be derived from the deep cervical fascia and be overlied by but separate from the parotid fascia.

The Sobotta Anatomy Textbook (2018) describes the masseteric fascia and parotideomasseteric fascia as two distinct but related structures. The masseteric fascia is said to cover the masseter muscle, dividing into a superficial layer and a deep layer - the two layers together constituting the parotideomasseteric fascia - to form a fascial compartment that encloses the masseter muscle as well as the medial and lateral pterygoid muscles (the pterygoid muscles being enclosed by the deep layer). The superficial layer is said to connect with the parotid fascia.

The Farlex Medical Dictionary (2012) describes the masseteric fascia as a fascia covering the superficial surface of the masseter muscle, and the parotideomasseteric fascia as a dense membrane covering both surfaces of the parotid gland that is anteriorly continuous with the masseteric fascia.

The 12th edition of Last's Anatomy (2011) describes the masseteric fascia and parotideomasseteric fascia as distinct structures related to the parotid fascia. The parotid fascia is described as consisting of an outer leaf and an inner leaf that are formed by a split of the deep cervical fascia: the outer leaf represents parotideomasseteric fascia and extends superiorly to the zygomatic arch; the parotid fascia is said to be considered the parotid capsule where it covers the gland while anteriorly to the gland it becomes known as the masseteric fascia.

The 5th edition of Illustrated Anatomy of the Head and Neck describes a masseteric-parotid fascia as covering the masseter muscle and structures inferior to the zygomatic arch, surrounding the parotid salivary gland.
