= Nasolabial fold =

Two skin folds in the face

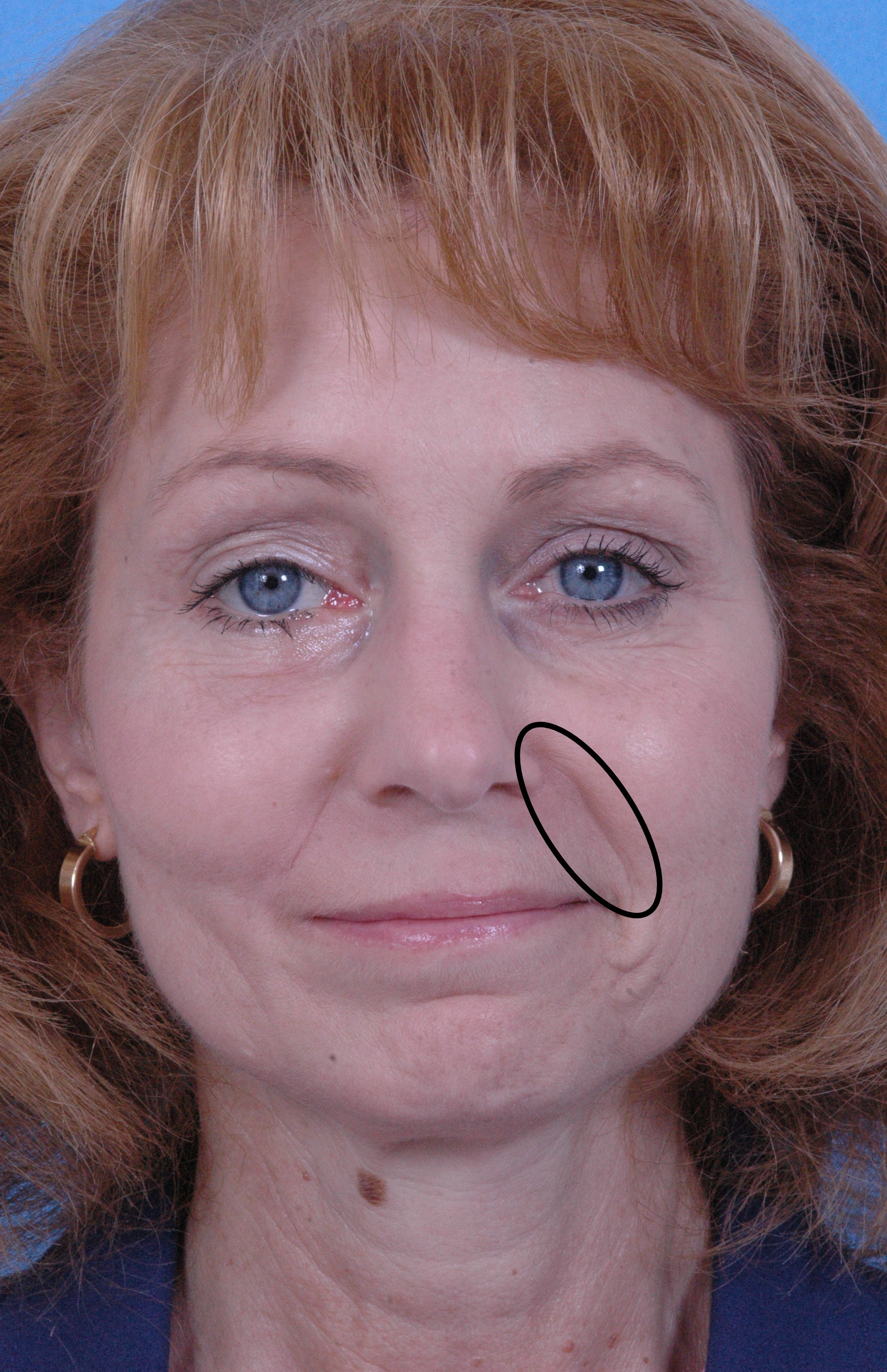
- Human face, with left nasolabial fold marked in black ellipse

Identifiers
- MeSH: D060052
- TA98: A01.2.01.017
- TA2: 220
- FMA: 75018

The nasolabial folds, commonly known as "smile lines" or "laugh lines", are facial features. They are the two skin folds that run from each side of the nose to the corners of the mouth. They are defined by facial structures that support the buccal fat pad. They separate the cheeks from the upper lip. The term derives from Latin nasus for "nose" and labium for "lip". Other people suggest the term melolabial fold, or the lip-cheek fold or groove. It is also known as the nasolabial sulcus.

== Cosmetology ==
With ageing the fold may grow in length and depth. Dermal fillings may be used to replace lost fats and collagen in this facial area.

== See also ==
- Epicanthal fold
- Nasalis muscle
- Marionette lines
