= Great auricular nerve =

Cutaneous nerve of the head

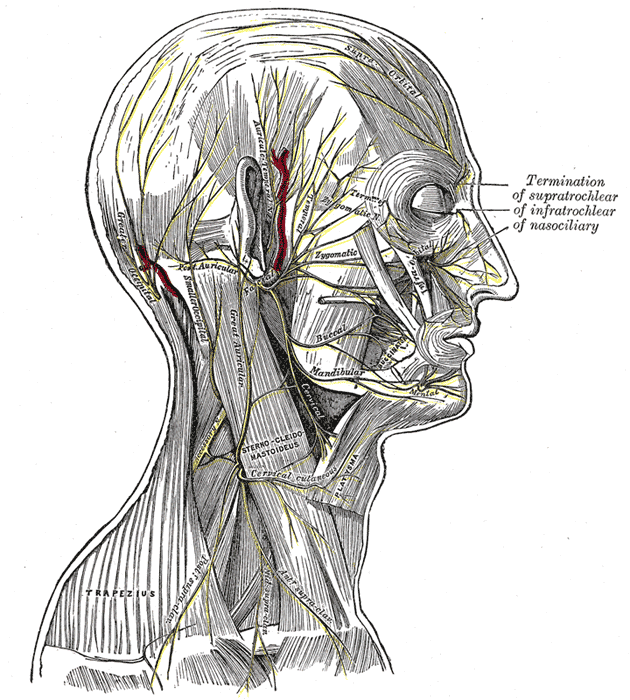
- The nerves of the scalp, face, and side of neck. (Great auricular visible below ear.)

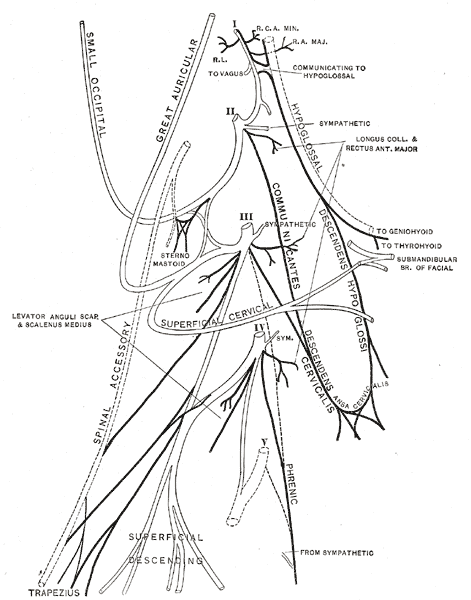
- Plan of the cervical plexus. (Great auricular labeled at top center.)

Details
- From: Cervical plexus (C2-C3)
- Innervates: Sensation of inferior part of auricle and parotid region of the face

Identifiers
- Latin: nervus auricularis magnus
- TA98: A14.2.02.018
- TA2: 6385
- FMA: 6872

The great auricular nerve is a cutaneous (sensory) nerve of the head. It originates from the second and third cervical (spinal) nerves (C2-C3) of the cervical plexus. It provides sensory innervation to the skin over the parotid gland and the mastoid process, parts of the outer ear, and to the parotid gland and its fascia.

Pain resulting from parotitis is caused by an impingement on the great auricular nerve.

== Structure ==
The great auricular nerve is the largest of the ascending branches of the cervical plexus.

=== Origin ===
It arises from the second and third cervical (spinal) nerves (C2-C3), with the predominant contribution coming from C2.

=== Course and relations ===
The great auricular nerve is a large trunk that ascends almost vertically over the sternocleidomastoid. It winds around the posterior border of the sternocleidomastoid muscle, then perforates the deep fascia before ascending alongside the external jugular vein upon that sternocleidomastoid muscle beneath the platysma muscle to the parotid gland. Upon reaching the parotid gland, it divides into an anterior branch and a posterior branch.

=== Branches ===
Anterior branch

The anterior branch (or facial branch) is distributed to the skin of the face over the parotid gland.

It communicates with the facial nerve (CN VII) inside the parotid gland.

Posterior branch

The posterior branch (or mastoid branch) innervates the skin over the mastoid process, on the back of the auricle (save for its upper part), of the lobule, and of the lower part of the concha.

The posterior branch communicates with the lesser occipital nerve, the auricular branch of the vagus, and the posterior auricular branch of the facial.

=== Distribution ===
The great auricular nerve is distributed to the skin of the face over the angle of the mandible and parotid gland (via anterior branch), skin over of the mastoid region (i.e. skin over the mastoid process) (via posterior branch), parts of the auricle (posterior branch), and the parotid gland and parotid fascia.

== Clinical significance ==
The great auricular nerve may be damaged during surgery on the parotid gland, reducing sensation to the face.

Pain resulting from parotitis is caused by an impingement on the great auricular nerve.

The intermingling of the great auricular nerve and the facial nerve (CN VII) is thought to be responsible for the pathogenesis of Frey's syndrome following parotidectomy.

== Additional images ==
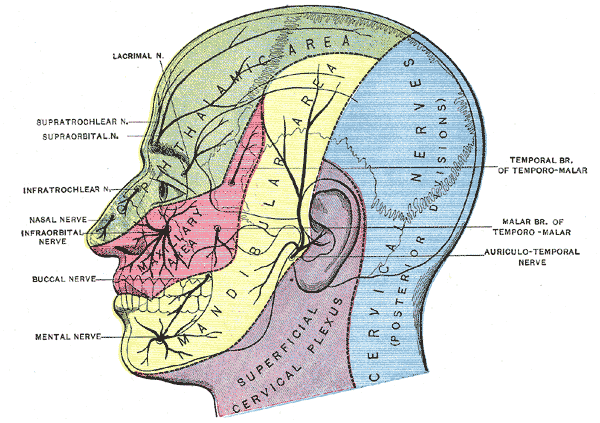
Dermatome distribution of the trigeminal nerve, also showing the sensory distribution of the great auricular, lesser occipital, and greater occipital nerves.

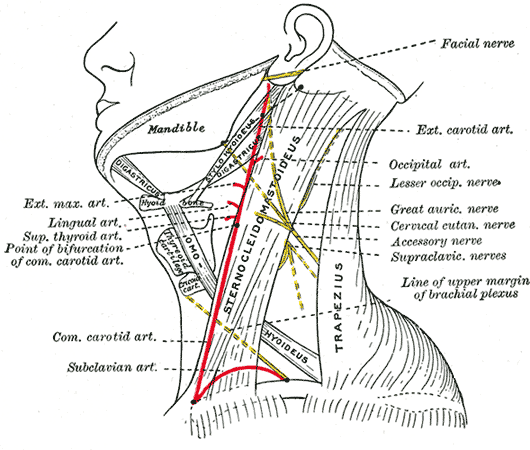
Side of neck, showing chief surface markings.
