= List of foramina of the human body =

This article lists foramina that occur in the human body.

== Skull ==
Image of base of the skull with several of the foramina labeled

The human skull has numerous openings (foramina), through which cranial nerves, arteries, veins, and other structures pass. These foramina vary in size and number, with age.

Bone	Cranial fossa	Foramina	Number	Vessels	Nerves
frontal	-	supraorbital foramen	2	supraorbital artery supraorbital vein	supraorbital nerve
frontal	anterior cranial fossa	foramen cecum	1	emissary veins to superior sagittal sinus from the upper part of the nose	
ethmoid	anterior cranial fossa (osama)	foramina of cribriform plate	~20	-	olfactory nerve bundles (I)
ethmoid	anterior cranial fossa	anterior ethmoidal foramen	2	anterior ethmoidal artery anterior ethmoidal vein	anterior ethmoidal nerve
ethmoid	anterior cranial fossa	posterior ethmoidal foramen	2	posterior ethmoidal artery posterior ethmoidal vein	posterior ethmoidal nerve
sphenoid	-	optic canal	2	ophthalmic artery	optic nerve (II)
sphenoid	middle cranial fossa	superior orbital fissure	2	superior ophthalmic vein	oculomotor nerve (III) trochlear nerve (IV) lacrimal, frontal and nasociliary branches of ophthalmic nerve (V_{1}) abducent nerve (VI)
sphenoid	middle cranial fossa	foramen rotundum	2	-	maxillary nerve (V_{2})
maxilla	-	incisive foramen/canal/Stenson/Scarpa	4	terminal branch of descending palatine artery	Terminal part of nasopalatine nerve (V2)
palatine	-	greater palatine foramen	2	greater palatine artery greater palatine vein	greater palatine nerve
palatine and sphenoid	-	foramen sphenopalatinum	2	sphenopalatine artery sphenopalatine vein	nasopalatine nerve rami nasales posteriores superiores (V2)
palatine and maxilla	-	lesser palatine foramina	4	lesser palatine arteries lesser palatine vein	lesser palatine nerve, greater palatine nerve
sphenoid and maxilla	-	inferior orbital fissure	2	inferior ophthalmic veins infraorbital artery infraorbital vein, tributary of pterygoid plexus	zygomatic nerve and infraorbital nerve of maxillary nerve (V_{2}) orbital branches of pterygopalatine ganglion
maxilla	-	infraorbital foramen	2	infraorbital artery infraorbital vein, tributary of pterygoid plexus	infraorbital nerve
sphenoid	middle cranial fossa	foramen ovale	2	accessory meningeal artery, emissary vein connecting cavernous sinus with pterygoid plexus	mandibular nerve (V_{3}) lesser petrosal nerve (occasionally)
sphenoid	middle cranial fossa	foramen spinosum	2	middle meningeal artery	meningeal branch of the mandibular nerve (V_{3})
sphenoid	middle cranial fossa	foramen lacerum	2	artery of pterygoid canal, Meningeal branch of ascending pharyngeal artery, emissary vein	nerve of pterygoid canal through its anterior wall
temporal	middle cranial fossa	carotid canal	2	internal carotid artery	internal carotid plexus, sympathetics from the superior cervical ganglion
temporal	posterior cranial fossa	internal acoustic meatus	2	labyrinthine artery	facial nerve (VII), vestibulocochlear nerve (VIII)
temporal	posterior cranial fossa	jugular foramen	2	internal jugular vein, inferior petrosal sinus, sigmoid sinus	glossopharyngeal nerve (IX), vagus nerve (X), accessory nerve (XI)
temporal	posterior cranial fossa	stylomastoid foramen	2	stylomastoid artery	facial nerve (VII)
occipital	posterior cranial fossa	hypoglossal canal	2	-	hypoglossal nerve (XII)
occipital	posterior cranial fossa	foramen magnum	1	anterior and posterior spinal arteries, vertebral arteries	lowest part of medulla oblongata, three meninges, ascending spinal fibers of accessory nerve (XI)
occipital	posterior cranial fossa	condylar canal	1	occipital emissary vein, meningeal branch of occipital artery	

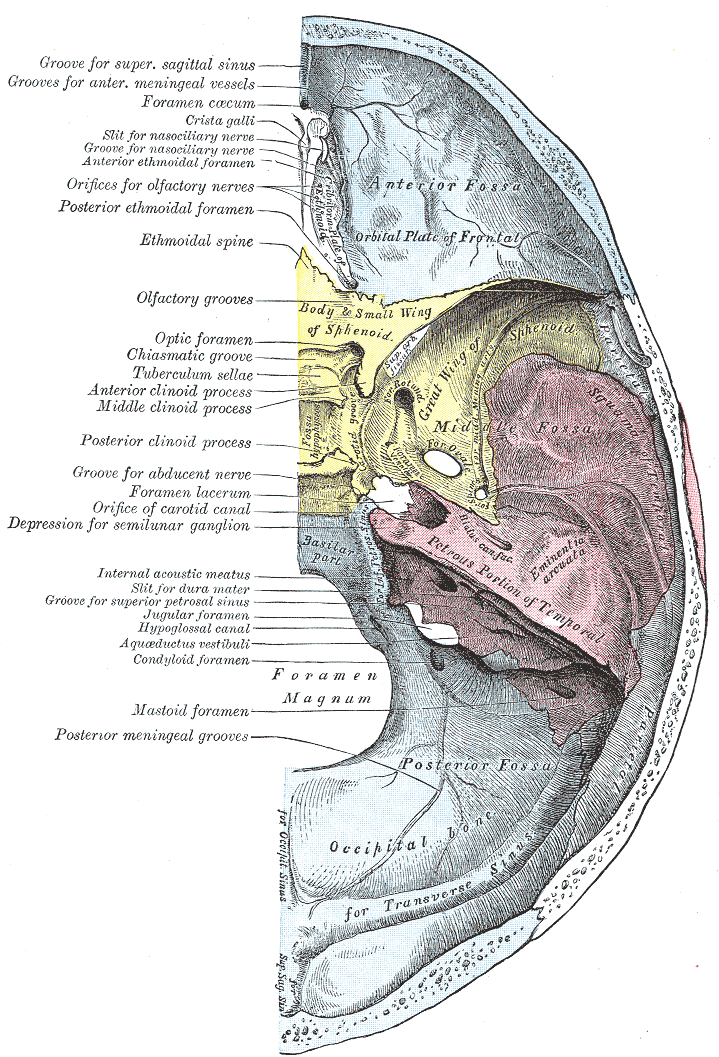
Base of the skull, upper surface

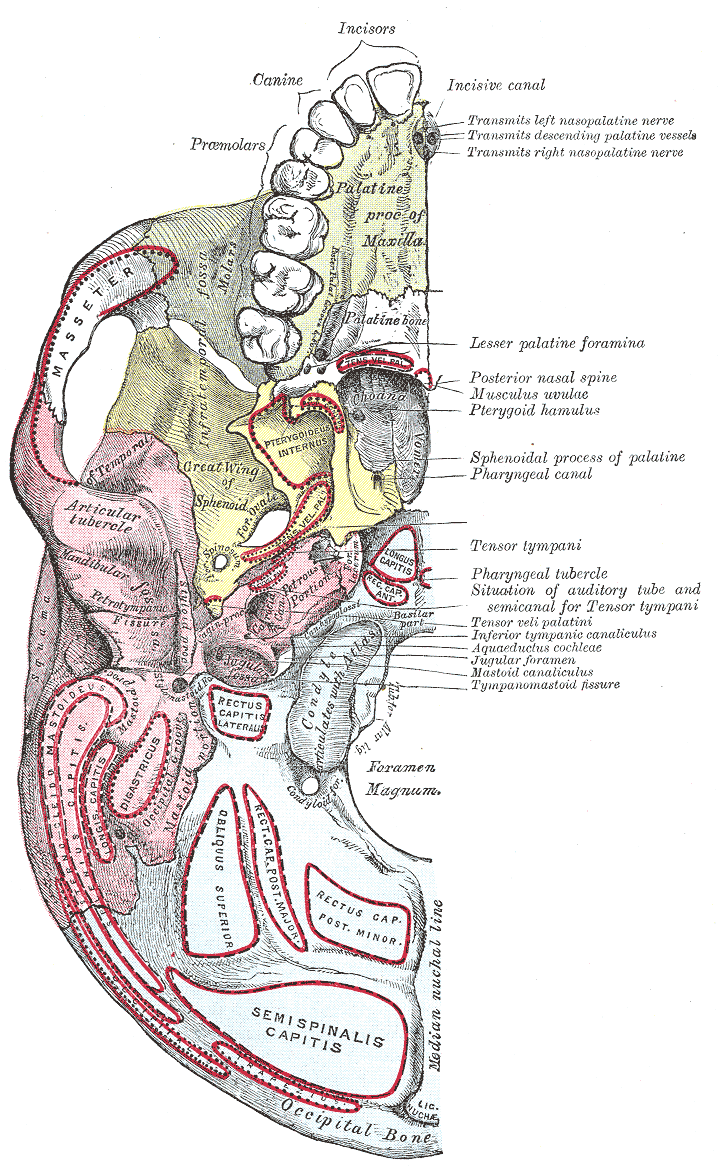
Base of the skull, inferior surface, attachment of muscles marked in red

== Spine ==
Within the vertebral column (spine) of vertebrates, including the human spine, each bone has an opening at both its top and bottom to allow nerves, arteries, veins, etc. to pass through.

== Other ==
- Apical foramen, the opening at the tip of the root of a tooth
- Foramen ovale (heart), an opening between the venous and arterial sides of the fetal heart
- Foramen transversarium, one of a pair of openings in each cervical vertebra, in which the vertebral artery travels
- Greater sciatic foramen, a major foramen of the pelvis
- Interventricular foramen, channels connecting ventricles in the brain
- Intervertebral foramen, foramina formed between vertebrae
- Lesser sciatic foramen, an opening between the pelvis and the posterior thigh
- Obturator foramen, the opening created by the ischium and pubis bones of the pelvis
- Vertebral foramen, the foramen formed by the anterior segment (the body), and the posterior part, the vertebral arch
