= Infratemporal fossa =

Cavity that is part of the skull

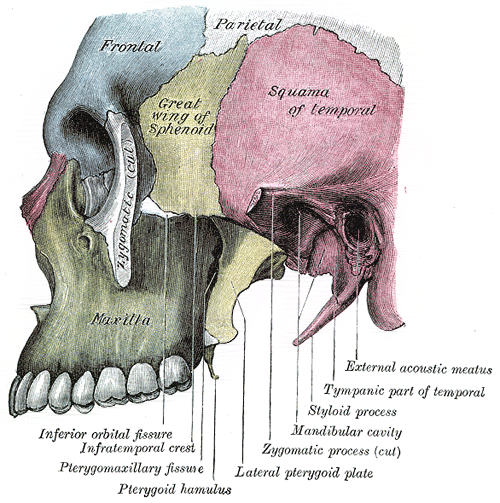
- Left infratemporal fossa.

Details
- Part of: Skull

Identifiers
- Latin: fossa infratemporalis
- MeSH: D000080884
- TA98: A02.1.00.024
- TA2: 428
- FMA: 75308

The infratemporal fossa is an irregularly shaped cavity that is a part of the skull. It is situated below and medial to the zygomatic arch. It is not fully enclosed by bone in all directions. It contains superficial muscles, including the lower part of the temporalis muscle, the lateral pterygoid muscle, and the medial pterygoid muscle. It also contains important blood vessels such as the middle meningeal artery, the pterygoid plexus, and the retromandibular vein, and nerves such as the mandibular nerve (CN V_{3}) and its branches.

== Structure ==
=== Boundaries ===
The boundaries of the infratemporal fossa occur:

- anteriorly, by the infratemporal surface of the maxilla, and the ridge which descends from its zygomatic process. This contains the alveolar canal.
- posteriorly, by the tympanic part of the temporal bone, and the spina angularis of the sphenoid.
- superiorly, by the greater wing of the sphenoid below the infratemporal crest, and by the under surface of the temporal squama, containing the foramen ovale, which transmits the mandibular branch of the trigeminal nerve, and the foramen spinosum, which transmits the middle meningeal artery.
- inferiorly, by the medial pterygoid muscle attaching to the mandible.
- medially, by the lateral pterygoid plate.
- laterally, by the ramus of mandible. This contains the mandibular foramen, leading to the mandibular canal through which the inferior alveolar nerve passes. This also contains the lingula, a triangular piece of bone that overlies the mandibular foramen antero-medially. Finally, the mylohyoid groove descends obliquely transmitting the mylohyoid nerve the only motor branch of the posterior division of the trigeminal nerve.

=== Contents ===
==== Muscles ====
- Lower part of the temporalis muscle and masseter muscle (origin of masseter muscle:lower margin of the inner surface of zygomatic bone insertion : outer surface of the ramus of the mandible)
- Lateral pterygoid muscle and medial pterygoid muscle.

==== Arteries ====
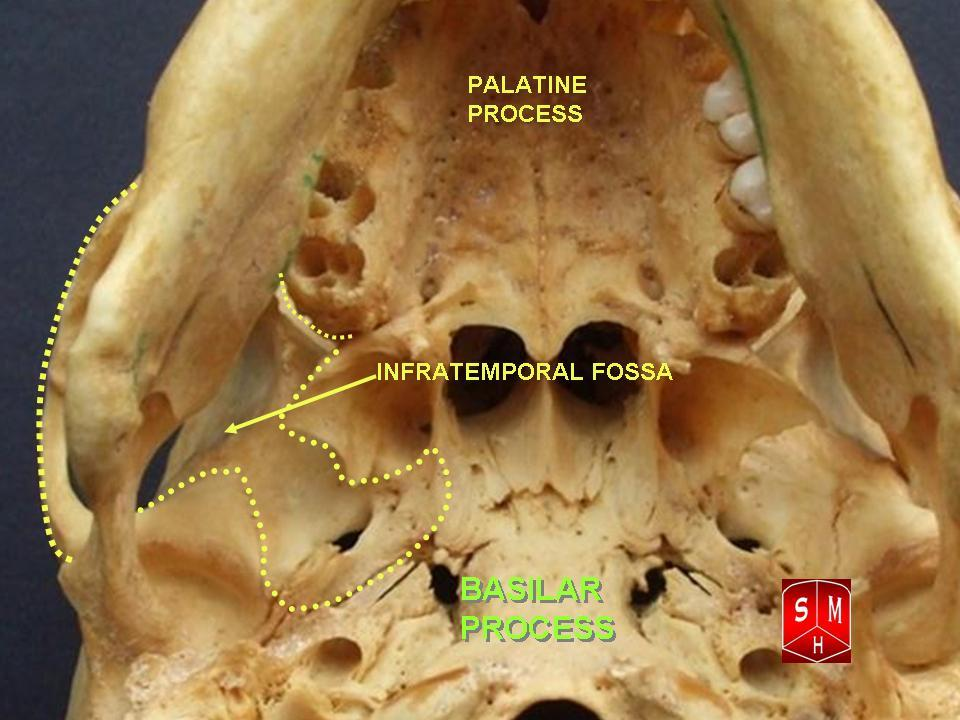
Infratemporal fossa

The infratemporal fossa contains the maxillary artery (originating from the external carotid artery). It also contains some of its branches, including the:

- middle meningeal artery
- inferior alveolar artery
- deep temporal artery
- buccal artery

==== Veins ====
The infratemporal fossa contains the pterygoid plexus, and the retromandibular vein.

==== Nerves ====
The infratemporal fossa contains the mandibular nerve, the inferior alveolar nerve, the lingual nerve, the buccal nerve, the chorda tympani nerve, and the otic ganglion.

===== Mandibular nerve =====
The mandibular nerve, the third branch of the trigeminal nerve (CN V_{3}), also known as the "inferior maxillary nerve", enters infratemporal fossa from the middle cranial fossa through the foramen ovale of the sphenoid bone.

The mandibular nerve gives off four nerves to the four muscles of mastication in the infratemporal fossa. These are the masseteric nerve to masseter muscle, the deep temporal nerve to temporalis muscle, the lateral pterygoid nerve to lateral pterygoid muscle, and the medial pterygoid nerve to medial pterygoid muscle. It also gives branches to mylohyoid muscle, the anterior belly of digastric muscle, the tensor veli palatini muscle, and tensor tympani muscle.

The mandibular nerve also gives off many sensory branches, including:

- meningeal nerve
- buccal nerve
- auriculotemporal nerve
- lingual nerve
- inferior alveolar nerve
- auricle
- external acoustic meatus
- tympanic membrane
- temporal region
- cheek
- skin overlying the mandible (except at the angle of the mandible)
- floor of mouth
- lower teeth
- gingiva

=== Communications ===
The infratemporal fossa is connected to other spaces in the skull. It is connected to the middle cranial fossa by the foramen ovale and the foramen spinosum. It is connected to the temporal fossa, which lies deep to zygomatic arch. It is connected to the pterygopalatine fossa through the pterygomaxillary fissure. It is connected to the orbit through the inferior orbital fissure. It is also connected to the parapharyngeal space. The inferior orbital fissure and the pterygomaxillary fissure form a T shape together.

== Clinical significance ==
Certain neoplasms can spread into the infratemporal fossa. This can be surgically removed through the middle cranial fossa. The infratemporal fossa can also be used to approach other parts of the skull. The infratemporal fossa can be imaged using a CT scan.

== Additional images ==
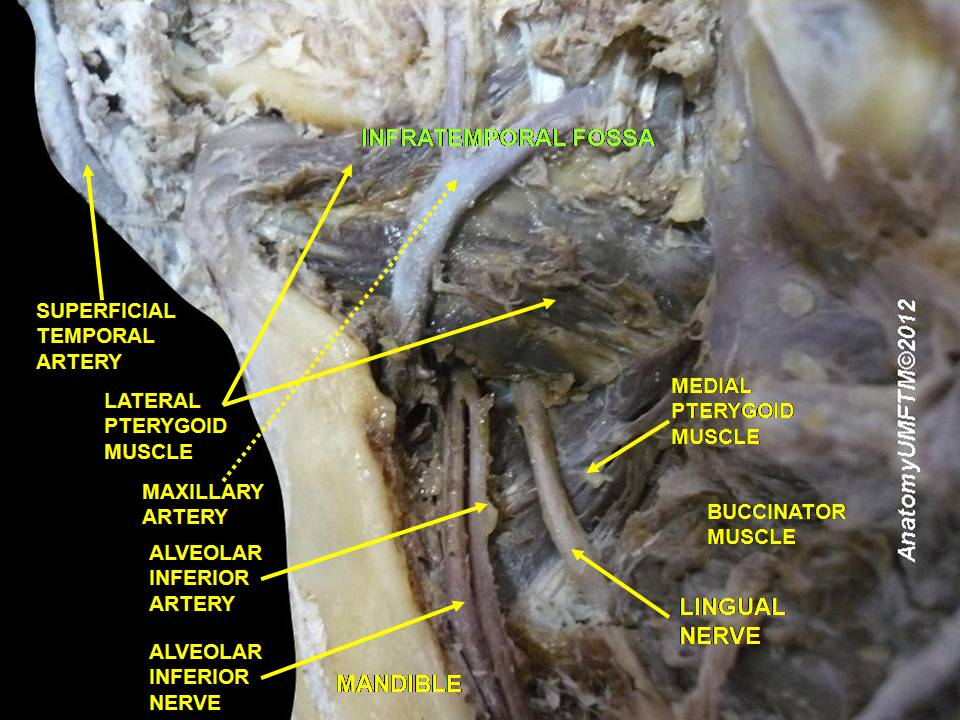
Infratemporal fossa

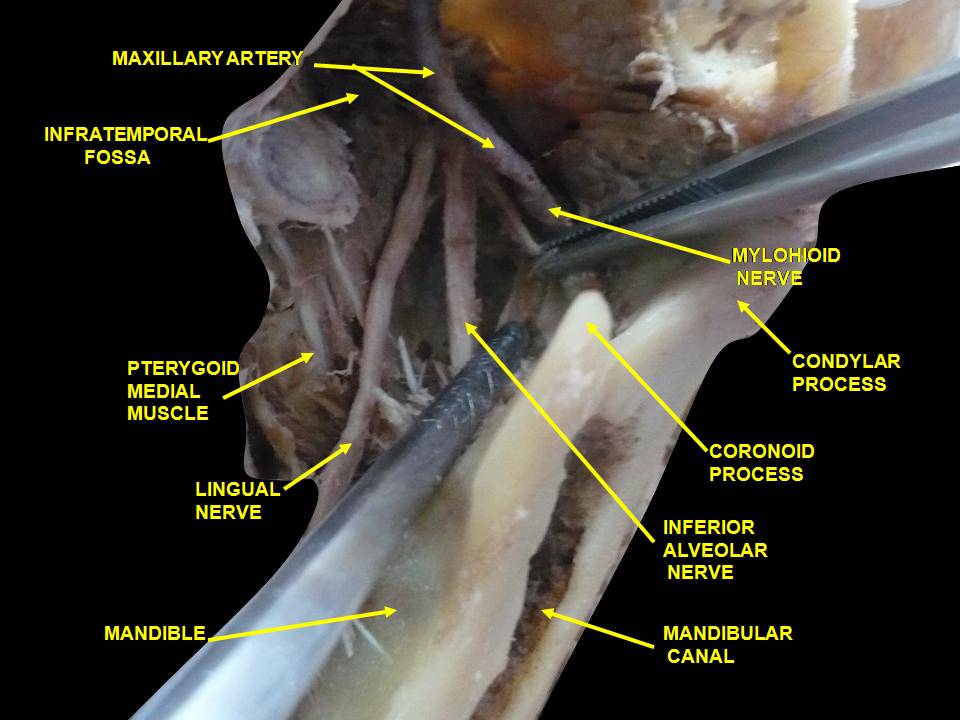
Infratemporal fossa. Lingual and inferior alveolar nerve. Deep dissection. Anterolateral view
