= Greater wing of sphenoid bone =

Large part of the skull front behind the eye socket

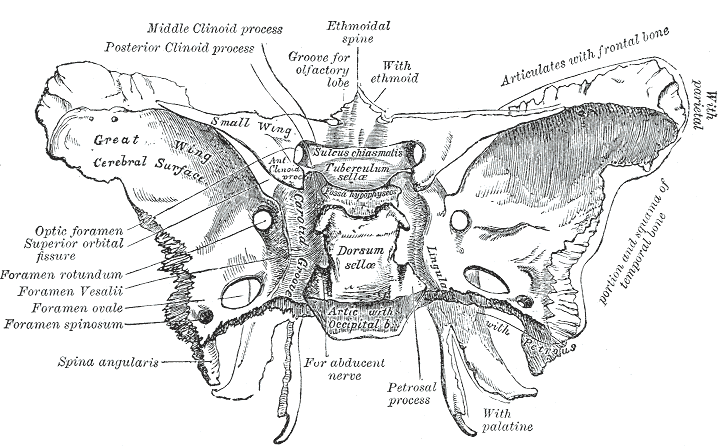
- Figure 1: Sphenoid bone, upper surface.

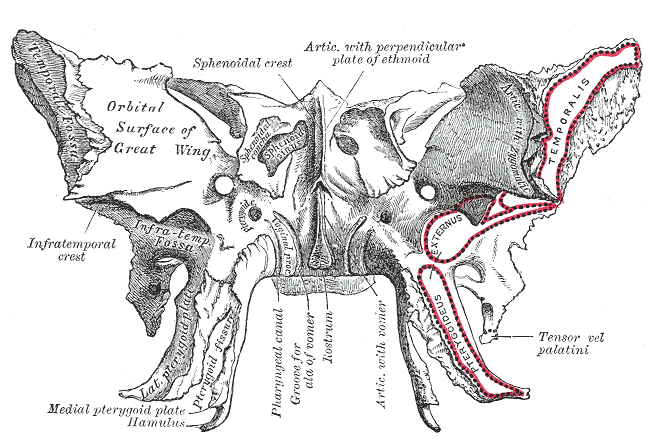
- Figure 2: Sphenoid bone, anterior and inferior surfaces.

Details

Identifiers
- Latin: ala major ossis sphenoidalis
- TA98: A02.1.05.024
- TA2: 610
- FMA: 52868

The greater wing of the sphenoid bone is a bony process of the sphenoid bone, positioned in the skull behind each eye. There is one on each side, extending from the side of the body of the sphenoid and curving upward, laterally, and backward. In other mammals it forms a separate bone, the alisphenoid.

== Structure ==
The greater wings of the sphenoid are two strong processes of bone, which arise from the sides of the body, and are curved upward, laterally, and backward; the posterior part of each projects as a triangular process that fits into the angle between the squamous and the petrous part of the temporal bone and presents at its apex a downward-directed process, the spine of sphenoid bone.

=== Cerebral surface ===
The superior or cerebral surface of each greater wing [Fig. 1] forms part of the middle cranial fossa; it is deeply concave, and presents depressions for the convolutions of the temporal lobe of the brain. It has a number of foramina (holes) in it:

- The foramen rotundum is a circular aperture at its anterior and medial part; it transmits the maxillary nerve.
- The foramen ovale is behind and lateral to this; it transmits the mandibular nerve, the accessory meningeal artery, and sometimes the lesser petrosal nerve.
- The sphenoidal emissary foramen is occasionally present; it is a small aperture medial to the foramen ovale, opposite the root of the pterygoid process; it opens below near the scaphoid fossa, and transmits a small vein from the cavernous sinus.
- The foramen spinosum, in the posterior angle near to and in front of the spine; it is a short canal that transmits the middle meningeal vessels and a recurrent branch from the mandibular nerve.
- The foramen petrosum, a small occasional opening, between the foramen spinosum and foramen ovale, for transmission of the lesser petrosal nerve.

=== Lateral surface ===
The lateral surface [Fig. 2] is convex, and divided by a transverse ridge, the infratemporal crest, into two portions.

- The superior temporal surface, convex from above downward, concave from before backward, forms a part of the temporal fossa, and gives attachment to the temporalis;
- the inferior infratemporal surface, smaller in size and concave, enters into the formation of the infratemporal fossa, and, together with the infratemporal crest, serves as an attachment to the lateral pterygoid muscle.

It is pierced by the foramen ovale and foramen spinosum, and at its posterior part is the sphenoidal spine, which is frequently grooved on its medial surface for the chorda tympani nerve.

To the sphenoidal spine are attached the sphenomandibular ligament and the tensor veli palatini muscle.

Medial to the anterior extremity of the infratemporal crest is a triangular process that serves to increase the attachment of the lateral pterygoid muscle; extending downward and medialward from this process on to the front part of the lateral pterygoid plate is a ridge that forms the anterior limit of the infratemporal surface, and, in the articulated skull, the posterior boundary of the pterygomaxillary fissure.

=== Orbital surface ===
The orbital surface of the great wing [Fig. 2], smooth, and quadrilateral in shape, is directed forward and medially and forms the posterior part of the lateral wall of the orbit.

- Its upper serrated edge articulates with the orbital plate of the frontal bone.
- Its inferior rounded border forms the postero-lateral boundary of the inferior orbital fissure.
- Its medial sharp margin forms the lower boundary of the superior orbital fissure and has projecting from about its center a little tubercle that gives attachment to the inferior head of the lateral rectus muscle; at the upper part of this margin is a notch for the transmission of a recurrent branch of the lacrimal artery.
- Its lateral margin is serrated and articulates with the zygomatic bone.
- Below the medial end of the superior orbital fissure is a grooved surface, which forms the posterior wall of the pterygopalatine fossa, and is pierced by the foramen rotundum.

=== Margin ===
Commencing from behind [Fig. 2], that portion of the circumference of the great wing that extends from the body to the spine is irregular.

- Its medial half forms the anterior boundary of the foramen lacerum, and presents the posterior aperture of the pterygoid canal for the passage of the corresponding nerve and artery.
- Its lateral half articulates, by means of a synchondrosis, with the petrous portion of the temporal, and between the two bones on the under surface of the skull, is a furrow, the sulcus of the auditory tube, for the lodgement of the cartilaginous part of the auditory tube.

In front of the spine the circumference presents a concave, serrated edge, bevelled at the expense of the inner table below, and of the outer table above, for articulation with the squamous part of the temporal bone.

At the tip of the great wing is a triangular portion, bevelled at the expense of the internal surface, for articulation with the sphenoidal angle of the parietal bone; this region is named the pterion.

Medial to this is a triangular, serrated surface, for articulation with the frontal bone; this surface is continuous medially with the sharp edge that forms the lower boundary of the superior orbital fissure, and laterally with the serrated margin for articulation with the zygomatic bone.

=== Development ===
The greater wing of the sphenoid bone starts as a separate bone, and is still separate at birth in humans.

== Function ==
The sphenoid bone assists with the formation of the base and the sides of the skull, and the floors and walls of the orbits. It is the site of attachment for most of the muscles of mastication. Many foramina and fissures are located in the sphenoid that carry nerves and blood vessels of the head and neck, such as the superior orbital fissure (with ophthalmic nerve), foramen rotundum (with maxillary nerve) and foramen ovale (with mandibular nerve).

== Clinical significance ==
In patients with neurofibromatosis type 1, malformation of the sphenoid bone wings may occur, due to aberrant cell development. This can ultimately lead to blindness if left untreated.

== In other animals ==
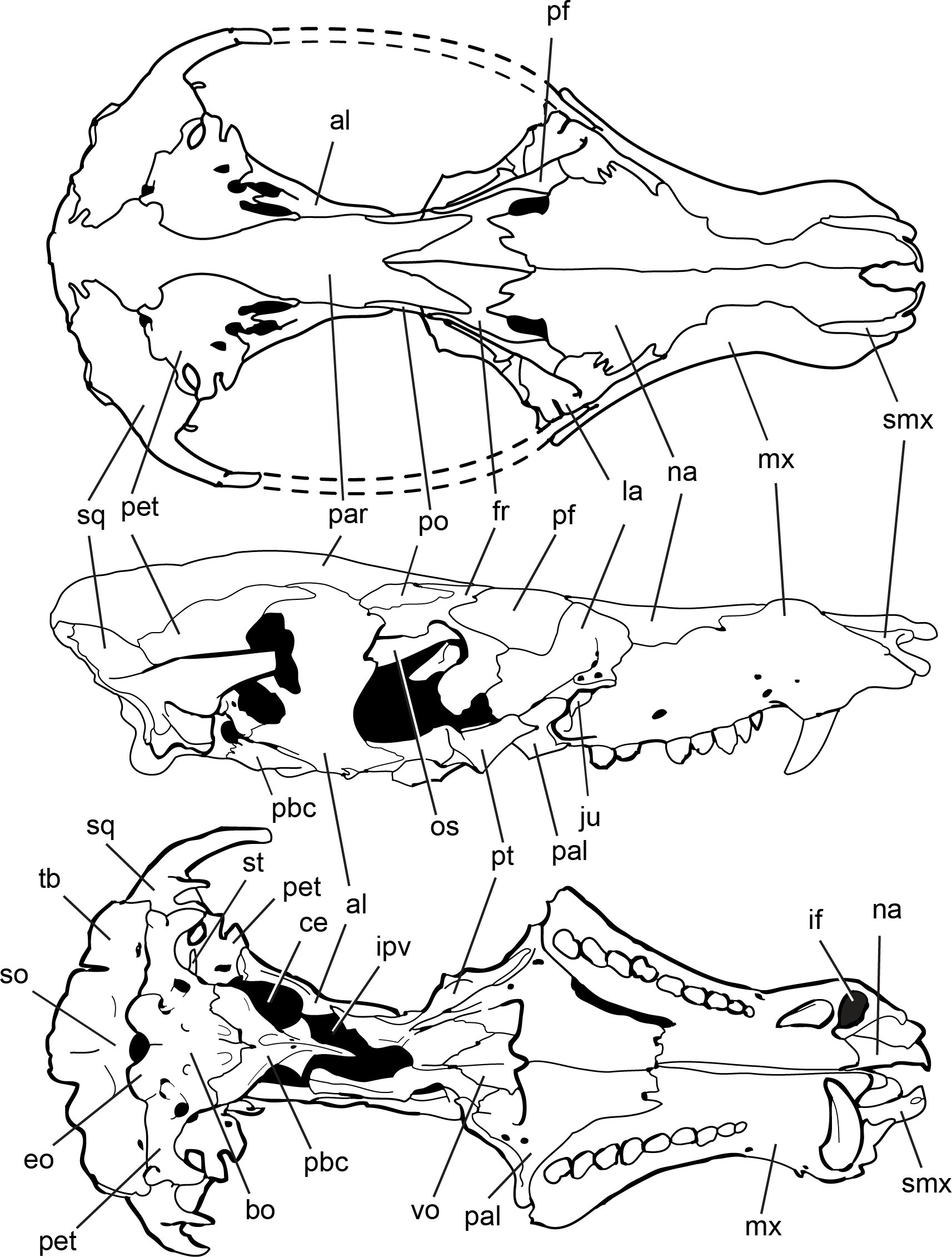
Skull of Pseudotherium. Alisphenoid is labeled al.

In many mammals and other cynodonts, the greater wing of the sphenoid bone stays through life a separate bone called the alisphenoid. The mammalian alisphenoid is homologous to the epipterygoid of other osteichthyans, and evolved from a portion of the palatoquadrate of the first branchial arch.

== Additional images ==
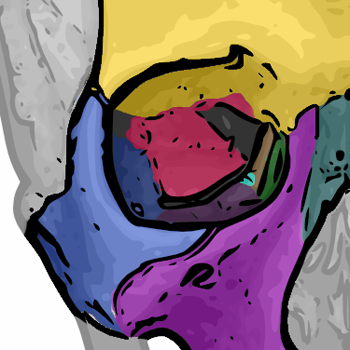
The seven bones that articulate to form the orbit.

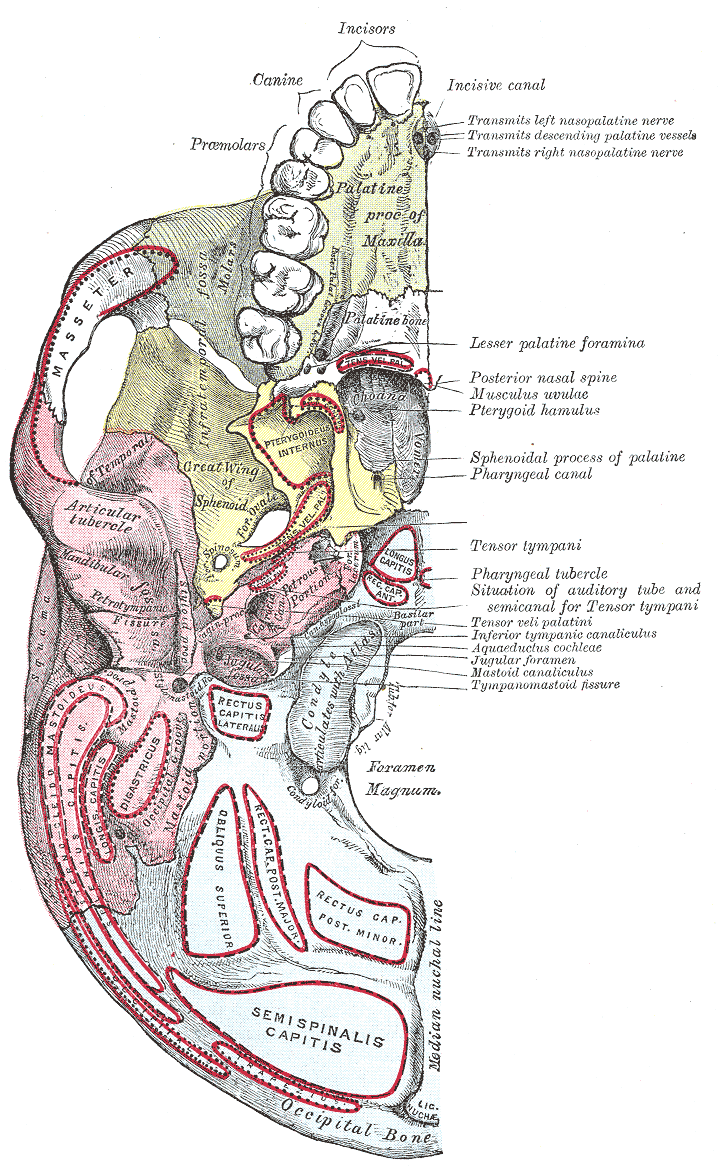
Base of skull. Inferior surface.

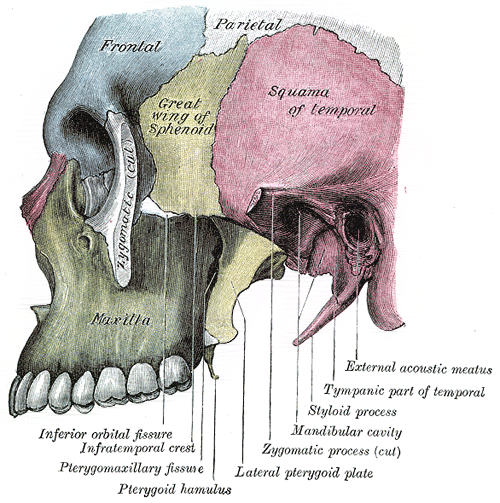
Left infratemporal fossa.

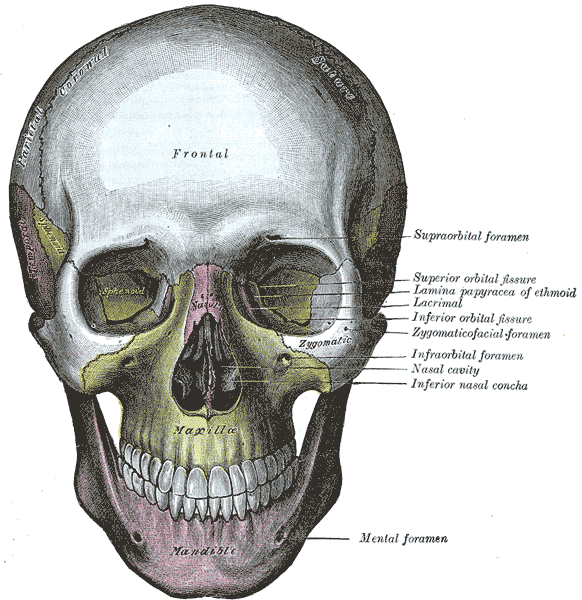
The skull from the front.

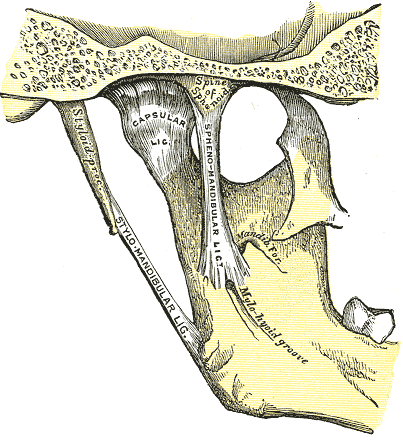
Articulation of the mandible. Medial aspect.

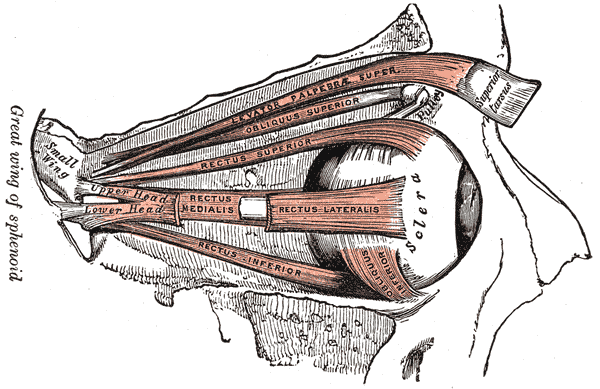
Muscles of the right orbit.

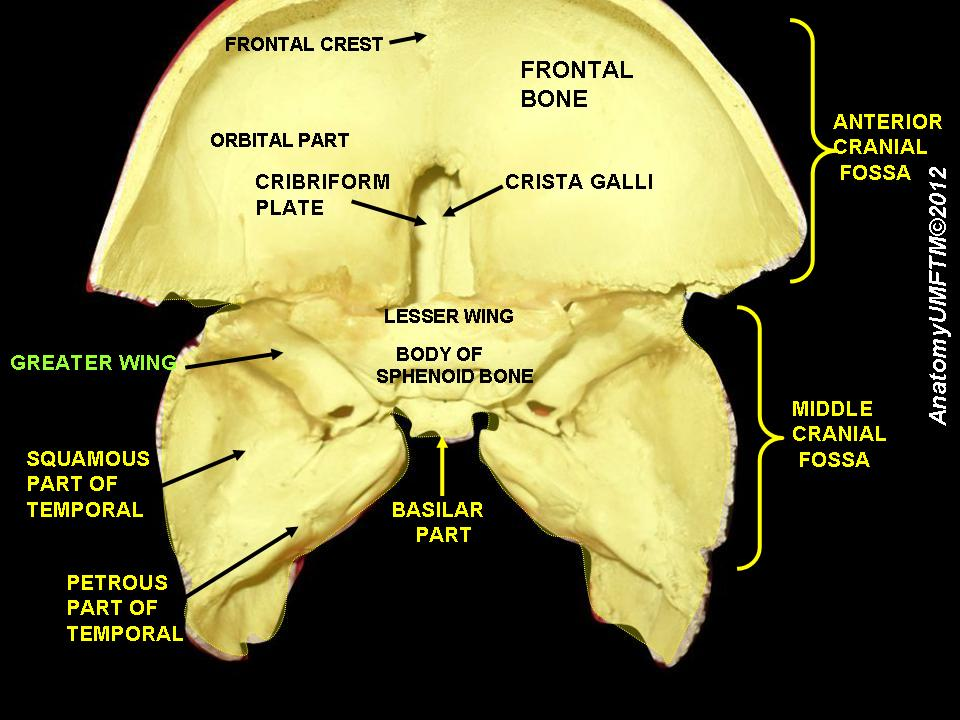
Greater wing of sphenoid bone

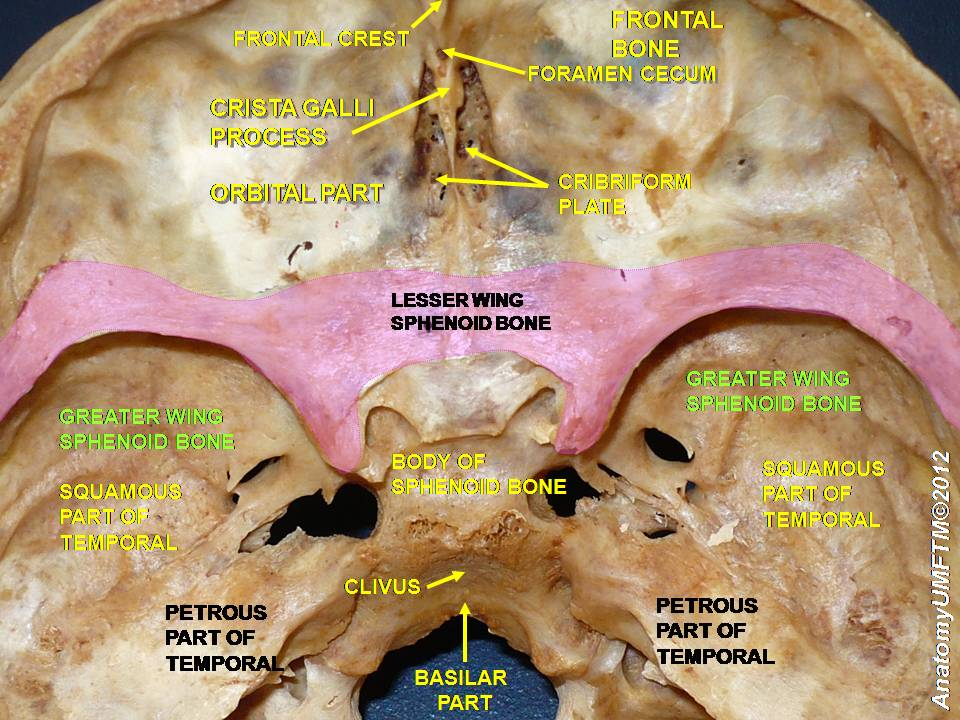
Greater wing of sphenoid bone

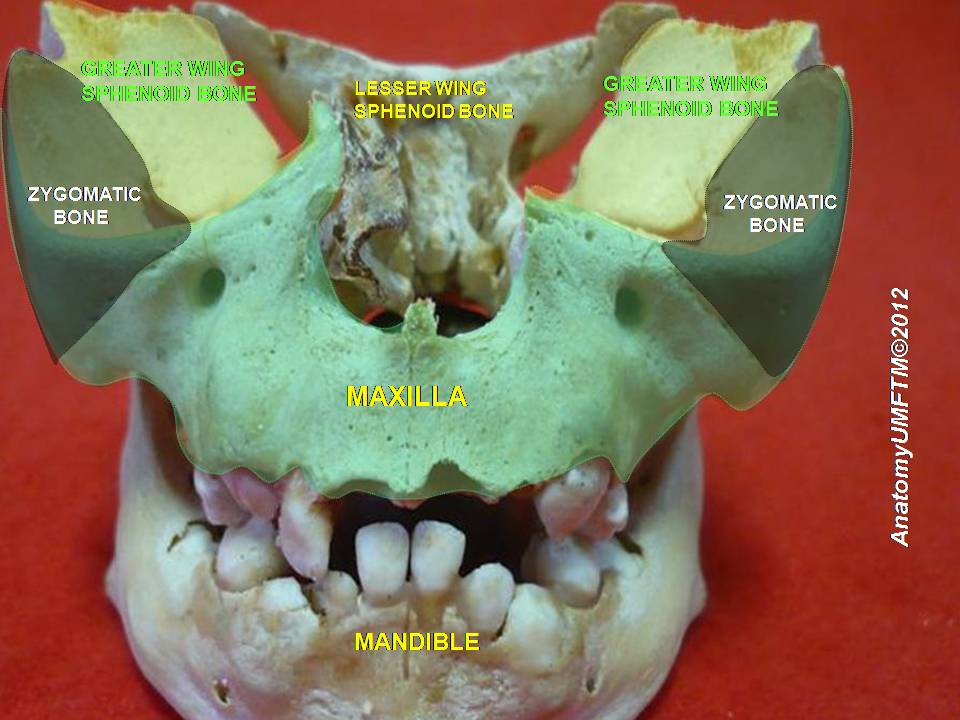
Greater wing of sphenoid bone

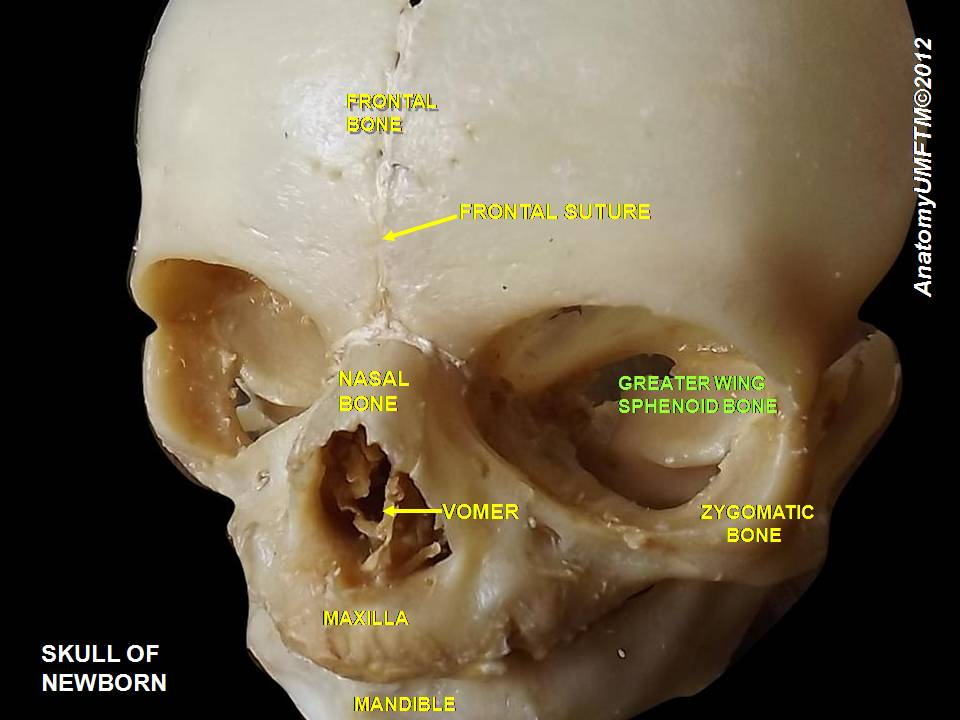
Greater wing of sphenoid bone

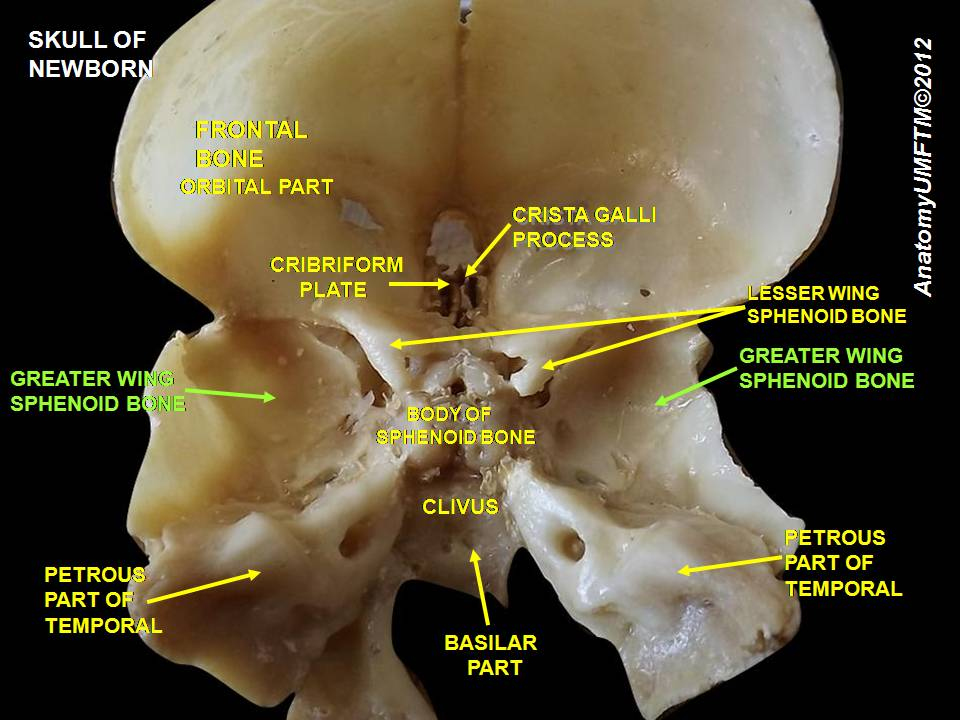
Greater wing of sphenoid bone
