= Middle meningeal nerve =

Branch of the maxillary nerve

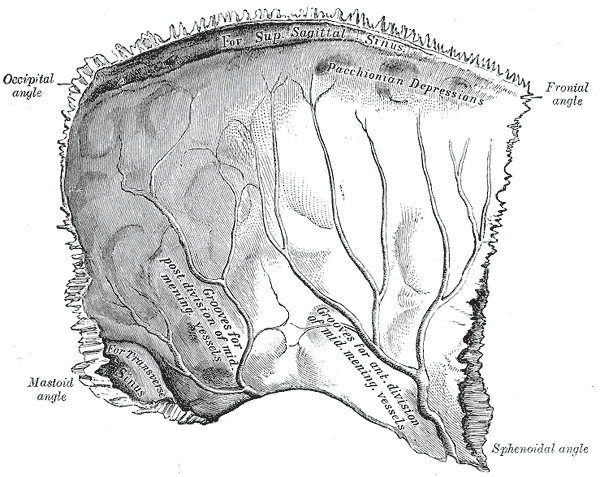
- Left parietal bone. Inner surface. (Nerve not labeled, but grooves visible at bottom.)

Details
- Innervates: Meninges

Identifiers
- Latin: nervus meningeus medius
- TA98: A14.2.01.038
- TA2: 6217
- FMA: 52728

The middle meningeal nerve (meningeal or dural branch) is a sensory branch of the maxillary nerve (CN V_{2}). It arises in the region of the pterygopalatine fossa and enters the cranial cavity through foramen rotundum. The nerve accompanies the middle meningeal artery and vein once they enter the cranium through the foramen spinosum. The nerve supplies sensory fibers to portions of the dura mater of the middle cranial fossa. The middle meningeal nerve is clinically relevant in conditions involving meningeal pain and in surgical procedures that involve the middle cranial fossa.

== Additional images ==
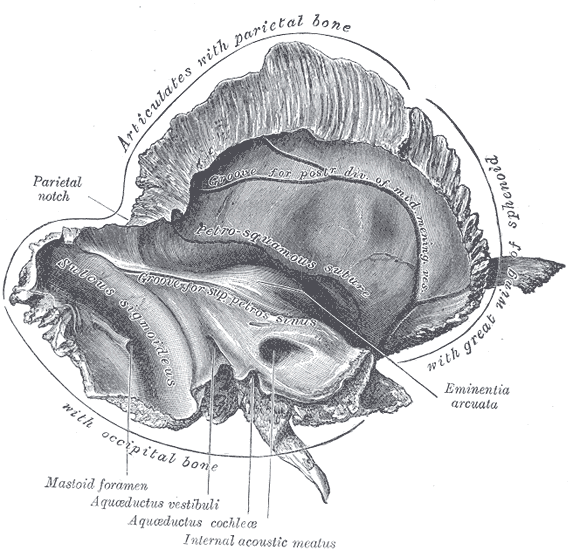
Left temporal bone. Inner surface.
