= Meningeal branch =

Meningeal branch (branch of the meninges) can refer to:

- Meningeal branches of vertebral artery
- Meningeal branch of occipital artery
- Meningeal branches of the ascending pharyngeal artery
- Meningeal branch of vagus nerve
- Meningeal branch of the mandibular nerve
- Meningeal branches of spinal nerve
