= Bare orbit sign =

Radiologic sign in neurofibromatosis

The bare orbit sign is the appearance of the orbit on a frontal (anteroposterior) radiograph of the skull in which the innominate line is absent. The innominate line is the radiographic projection of the greater wing of the sphenoid bone, and its loss makes the orbit look "bare". The sign is a feature of sphenoid wing dysplasia in neurofibromatosis type 1 (NF1). Alongside the missing innominate line, there is egg-shaped enlargement of the anterior orbital rim, a bony defect in the posterior orbit, and anteroposterior enlargement of the middle cranial fossa.

Sphenoid wing dysplasia occurs in about 5 to 10% of people with NF1 and is one of the National Institutes of Health diagnostic criteria for the condition. When it is accompanied by pulsatile exophthalmos, expansion of the temporal fossa, and herniation of the temporal lobe into the orbit, the picture is termed the cranio-orbital-temporal subtype of NF1. The cause of the dysplasia is uncertain. It may be a primary developmental defect of the sphenoid bone, or it may be a secondary change related to an adjacent orbital plexiform neurofibroma or other mass.
