= Meningeal nerve =

Meningeal nerve may refer to:

- Middle meningeal nerve
- Meningeal branch of the mandibular nerve
