= Deep temporal =

Deep temporal may refer to:

- Deep temporal nerves
- Deep temporal arteries
