= Parietal branch =

Parietal branch (a branch near the parietal bone) may refer to:

- parietal branch of superficial temporal artery
- parietal branch of the middle meningeal artery
