= Foramen ovale =

There are multiple structures in the human body with the name foramen ovale (plural: foramina ovalia; Latin for "oval hole"):

- Foramen ovale (heart), in the fetal heart, a shunt from the right atrium to left atrium
- Foramen ovale (skull), at the base of the skull, one of the holes that transmit nerves through the skull
- Patent foramen ovale, a small channel in the heart, a remnant of the fetal foramen ovale
