= Sphenoidal emissary foramen =

Small opening in the base of the skull

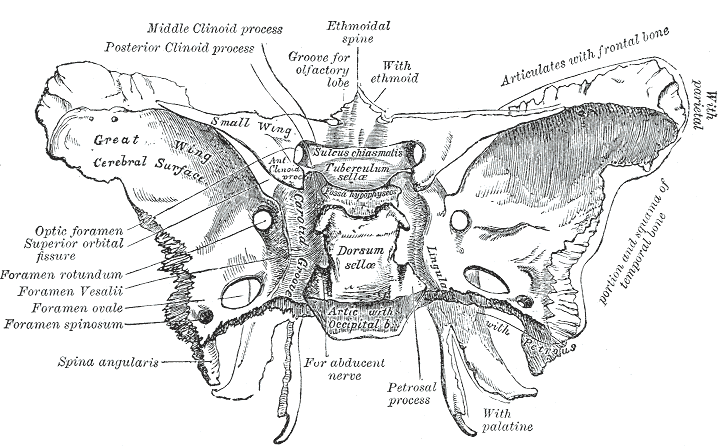
- Sphenoid bone. Upper surface. (Sphenoidal emissary foramen labeled at left, fourth from bottom.)

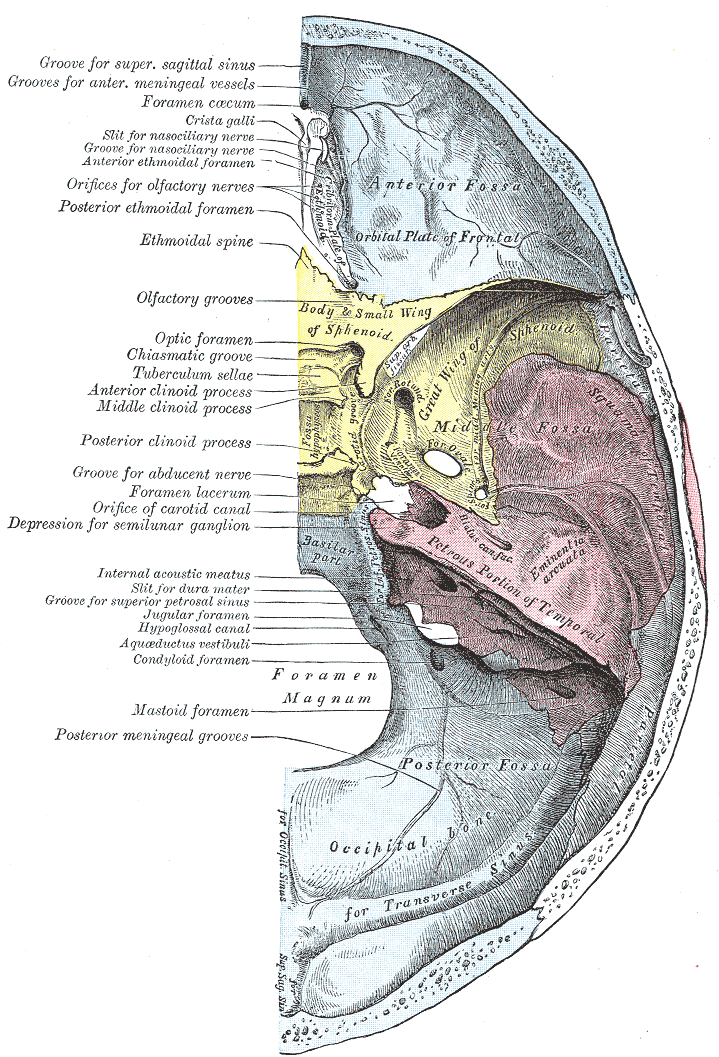
- Base of the skull. Upper surface. (Sphenoid is yellow, and sphenoidal emissary foramen is labeled at bottom of sphenoid.)

Details

Identifiers
- Latin: foramen venosum
- TA98: A02.1.05.037
- TA2: 623
- FMA: 53157 54785, 53157

In the base of the skull, in the great wings of the sphenoid bone, medial to the foramen ovale, a small aperture, the sphenoidal emissary foramen, may occasionally be seen (it is often absent) opposite the root of the pterygoid process. When present, it opens below near the scaphoid fossa. Vesalius was the first to describe and illustrate this foramen, and is also called the foramen Vesalius. Other names include foramen venosum and canaliculus sphenoidalis.

== Importance ==
If at all present, the sphenoidal emissary foramen gives passage to a small vein (vein of Vesalius) that connects the pterygoid plexus with the cavernous sinus. The importance of this passage lies in the fact that an infected thrombus from an extracranial source may reach the cavernous sinus. The mean area of the foramen is small, which may suggest that it plays a minor role in the dynamics of blood circulation in the venous system of the head.

== Structure ==
The sphenoidal emissary foramen varies in size in different individuals, and is not always present on both sides of the sphenoid bone (one on each great wing of the sphenoid). In a study conducted under 100 skulls, the sphenoidal emissary foramen was only present in 17% of the cases, and it was always single.

In another study, the differences between the right and the left side as well as the differences between the male and the female sex were noted. Out of the 70 sides observed (35 skulls total), the sphenoidal emissary foramen was present in 32.85% of the cases (20.0% right side, 12.85% left side). The incidence of bilateral and unilateral sphenoidal emissary foramen was 22.85% (8 out of 35 skulls) and 20% (7 out of 35 skulls) respectively. Regarding the differences between the male and the female sex, no remarkable differences were observed, although the occurrence of the foramen was more in females compared to males (found in 13 sides in females and in 10 sides in males).
The skulls with one foramen were most frequent; those with two followed it and those with 3 (sphenoidal emissary) foramina were least frequent. Lang (1983) reported that the sphenoidal emissary foramen was present in about 40% of his material. It was found on the right side in 49% of the cases and in 36% of the cases on the left.

In the newborn, the foramen is about 1.0 mm in length, in the adults at the right side about 2 mm and at the left side 1.4 mm. The width increases from 1.0 to 1.14 mm at the right side and from 1.0 to 1.3 mm at the left side.

=== Asymmetry ===
Though the sphenoidal emissary foramen is small and variable, it is consistently symmetrical. In a study in which 50 high-resolution CT scans of the base of the skull were reviewed, the significance of asymmetry was investigated. In a large number of cases, the foramen was remarkably symmetric, and where there was asymmetry, it signified abnormality in four of the six cases. Abnormal causes of asymmetry included invasion by nasopharyngeal melanoma, angiofibroma, carotid-cavernous fistula with drainage through the emissary veins, and neurofibromatosis. Thus, for the usually symmetric sphenoidal emissary foramina, asymmetry is more likely the result of a pathologic process than a normal variant. Ginsberg, Pruett, Chen and Elster did not find that asymmetry indicated disease in a study under 123 CT studies.

== See also ==
- Foramina of skull
