= Sphenopetrosal fissure =

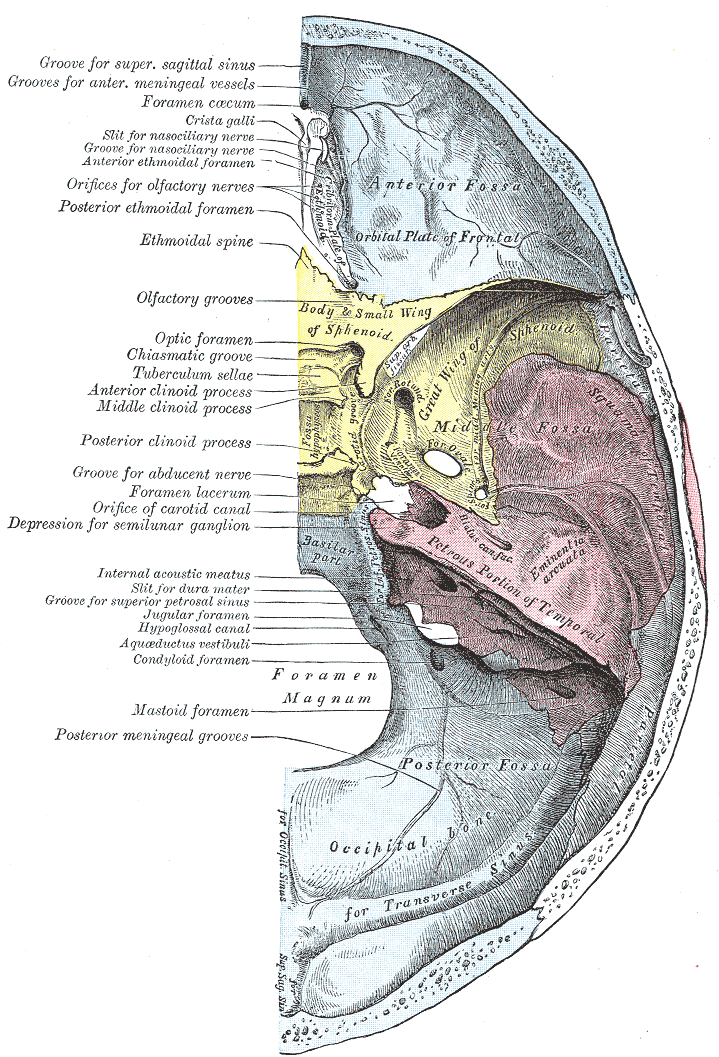
- Base of the skull. Upper surface. (Sphenopetrosal suture is the suture between the sphenoid bone, in yellow, and the temporal bone, in pink. "Petrous portion of temporal" is labeled right above the crest at the bottom of the pink region.)

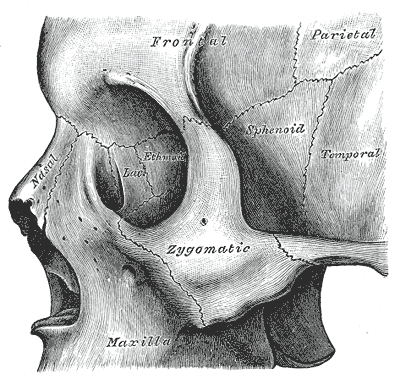
- Left zygomatic bone in situ.

Details

Identifiers
- Latin: fissura sphenopetrosa, sutura sphenopetrosa
- TA98: A02.1.00.046
- TA2: 449
- FMA: 75038

The sphenopetrosal fissure (or sphenopetrosal suture) is the cranial suture between the sphenoid bone and the petrous portion of the temporal bone.

It is in the middle cranial fossa.
