= Superior tympanic artery =

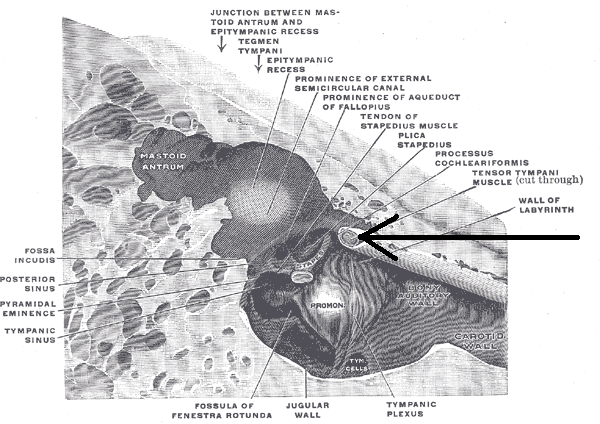
- The medial wall and part of the posterior and anterior walls of the right tympanic cavity, lateral view. (Artery not shown, but tensor tympani muscle indicated with arrow)

Details
- Precursor: Stapedial artery - supraorbital branch
- Source: Middle meningeal artery
- Supplies: Tensor tympani muscle

Identifiers
- Latin: arteria tympanica superior
- TA98: A12.2.05.067
- TA2: 4437
- FMA: 49720

The superior tympanic artery is a small artery in the head. It is a branch of the middle meningeal artery. On entering the cranium it runs in the canal for the tensor tympani muscle and supplies this muscle and the lining membrane of the canal.
