= Middle cranial fossa =

Compound structure in the skull

- Superior view of the skull base. Middle cranial fossa shown in green. 1: Sphenoidal limbus (anterior margin of the chiasmatic groove); 2: Posterior borders of the lesser wings of the sphenoid 3: Dorsum sellae of the sphenoid bone 4: Superior borders of the petrous part of the temporal bone

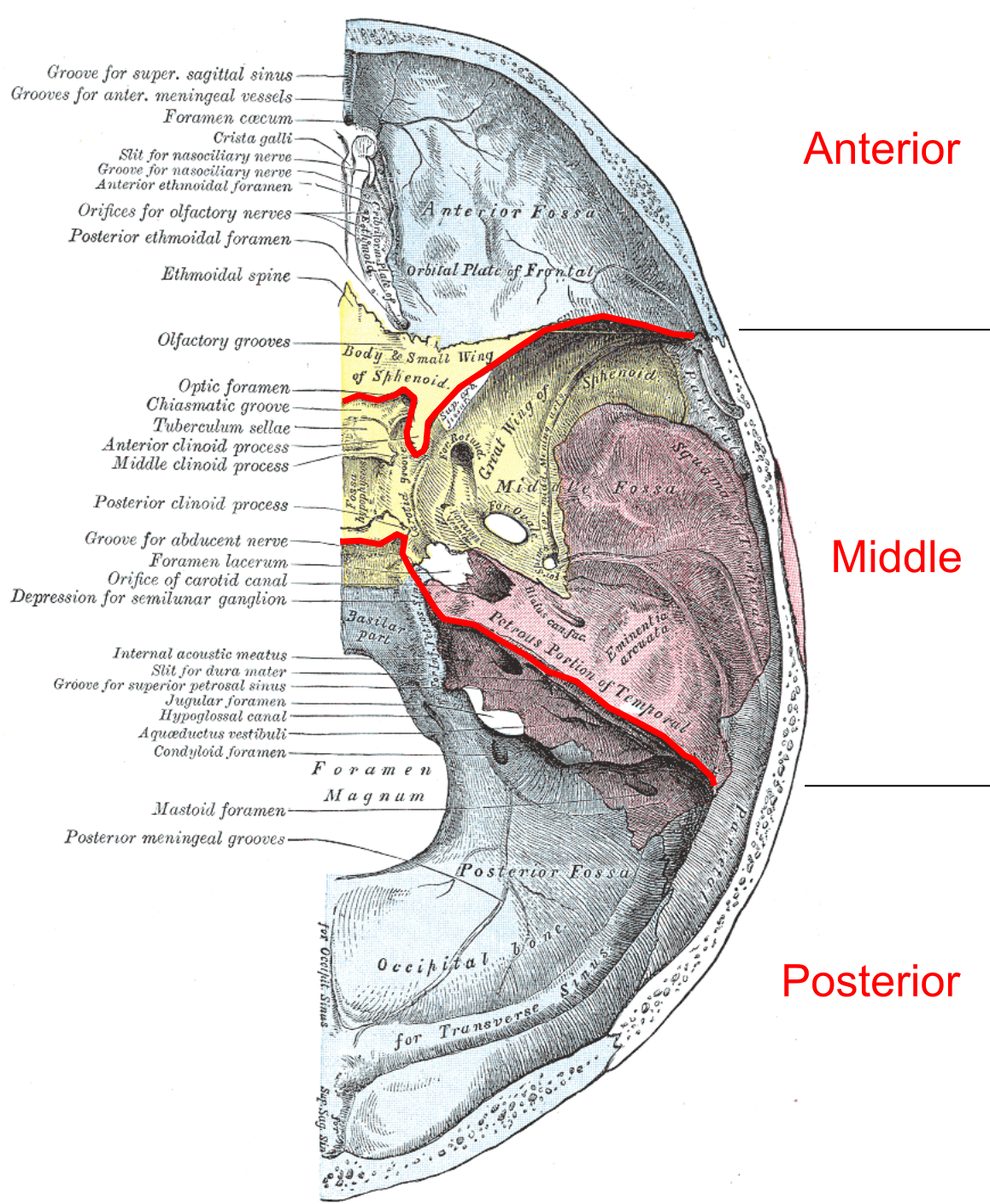
- Base of the skull. Upper surface. (Middle cranial fossa is the centermost of the three indentations, in pink and yellow.)

Details

Identifiers
- Latin: fossa cranii media
- MeSH: D035301
- TA98: A02.1.00.049
- TA2: 452
- FMA: 54369

The middle cranial fossa is formed by the sphenoid bones, and the temporal bones. It lodges the temporal lobes, and the pituitary gland. It is deeper than the anterior cranial fossa, is narrow medially and widens laterally to the sides of the skull. It is separated from the posterior cranial fossa by the clivus and the petrous crest.

It is bounded in front by the posterior margins of the lesser wings of the sphenoid bone, the anterior clinoid processes, and the ridge forming the anterior margin of the chiasmatic groove; behind, by the superior angles of the petrous portions of the temporal bones and the dorsum sellae; laterally by the temporal squamae, sphenoidal angles of the parietals, and greater wings of the sphenoid. It is traversed by the squamosal, sphenoparietal, sphenosquamosal, and sphenopetrosal sutures.

== Anatomy ==
=== Features ===
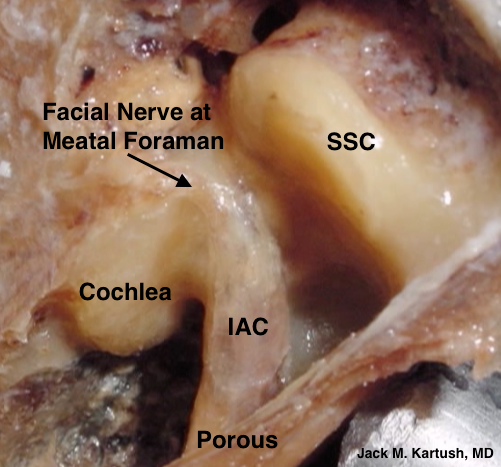
Middle cranial fossa surgical anatomy as demonstrated in a right cadaver temporal bone by Dr Jack M Kartush - view from above.

==== Middle part ====
The middle part of the fossa presents, in front, the chiasmatic groove and tuberculum sellae; the chiasmatic groove ends on either side at the optic foramen, which transmits the optic nerve and ophthalmic artery to the orbital cavity.

Behind the optic foramen the anterior clinoid process is directed backward and medialward and gives attachment to the cerebellar tentorium .

Behind the tuberculum sellae is a deep depression, the sella turcica, containing the fossa hypophyseos, which lodges the pituitary gland, and presents on its anterior wall the middle clinoid processes.

The sella turcica is bounded posteriorly by a quadrilateral plate of bone, the dorsum sellae, the upper angles of which are surmounted by the posterior clinoid processes: these afford attachment to the cerebellar tentorium, and below each is a notch for the abducent nerve.

On either side of the sella turcica is the carotid groove, which is broad, shallow, and curved somewhat like the italic letter f.

It begins behind at the foramen lacerum, and ends on the medial side of the anterior clinoid process, where it is sometimes converted into a foramen (carotico-clinoid) by the union of the anterior with the middle clinoid process; posteriorly, it is bounded laterally by the lingula.

This groove lodges the cavernous sinus and the internal carotid artery, the latter being surrounded by a plexus of sympathetic nerves.

==== Lateral parts ====
The lateral parts of the Middletown fossa are of considerable depth, and support the temporal lobes of the brain.

They are marked by depressions for the brain convolutions and traversed by furrows for the anterior and posterior branches of the middle meningeal vessels.

These furrows begin near the foramen spinosum, and the anterior runs forward and upward to the sphenoidal angle of the parietal, where it is sometimes converted into a bony canal; the posterior runs lateralward and backward across the temporal squama and passes on to the parietal near the middle of its lower border.

The following apertures are also to be seen.

In front is the superior orbital fissure, bounded above by the small wing, below, by the great wing, and medially, by the body of the sphenoid; it is usually completed laterally by the orbital plate of the frontal bone.

It transmits to the orbital cavity the oculomotor, the trochlear, the ophthalmic division of the trigeminal, and the abducent nerves, some filaments from the cavernous plexus of the sympathetic, and the orbital branch of the middle meningeal artery; and from the orbital cavity a recurrent branch from the lacrimal artery to the dura mater, and the ophthalmic veins.

Behind the medial end of the superior orbital fissure is the foramen rotundum, for the passage of the maxillary nerve.

Behind and lateral to the foramen rotundum is the foramen ovale, which transmits the mandibular nerve, the accessory meningeal artery, and the lesser superficial petrosal nerve.

Medial to the foramen ovale is the foramen Vesalii, which varies in size in different individuals, and is often absent; when present, it opens below at the lateral side of the scaphoid fossa, and transmits a small vein.

Lateral to the foramen ovale is the foramen spinosum, for the passage of the middle meningeal vessels, and a recurrent branch from the mandibular nerve.

Medial to the foramen ovale is the foramen lacerum; in the fresh state the lower part of this aperture is filled up by a layer of fibrocartilage, while its upper and inner parts transmit the internal carotid artery surrounded by a plexus of sympathetic nerves.

The nerve of the pterygoid canal and a meningeal branch from the ascending pharyngeal artery pierce the layer of fibrocartilage.

On the anterior surface of the petrous portion of the temporal bone are seen the eminence caused by the projection of the superior semicircular canal; in front of and a little lateral to this a depression corresponding to the roof of the tympanic cavity; the groove leading to the hiatus of the facial canal, for the transmission of the greater superficial petrosal nerve and the petrosal branch of the middle meningeal artery; beneath it, the smaller groove, for the passage of the lesser superficial petrosal nerve; and, near the apex of the bone, the depression for the semilunar ganglion and the orifice of the carotid canal.

During fetal development, the bones of the skull are formed partly by intramembranous ossification and partly by endochondral ossification. The brain develops within the skull, and its shape is directly related to the configuration of the cranial fossae. A high degree of symmetry is maintained in the midline of the developing fetal skull.

== Clinical significance ==
A middle fossa craniotomy is one means to surgically remove acoustic neuromas (vestibular schwannoma) growing within the internal auditory canal of the temporal bone.

== See also ==
- Anterior cranial fossa
- Posterior cranial fossa

== Additional images ==
Animation

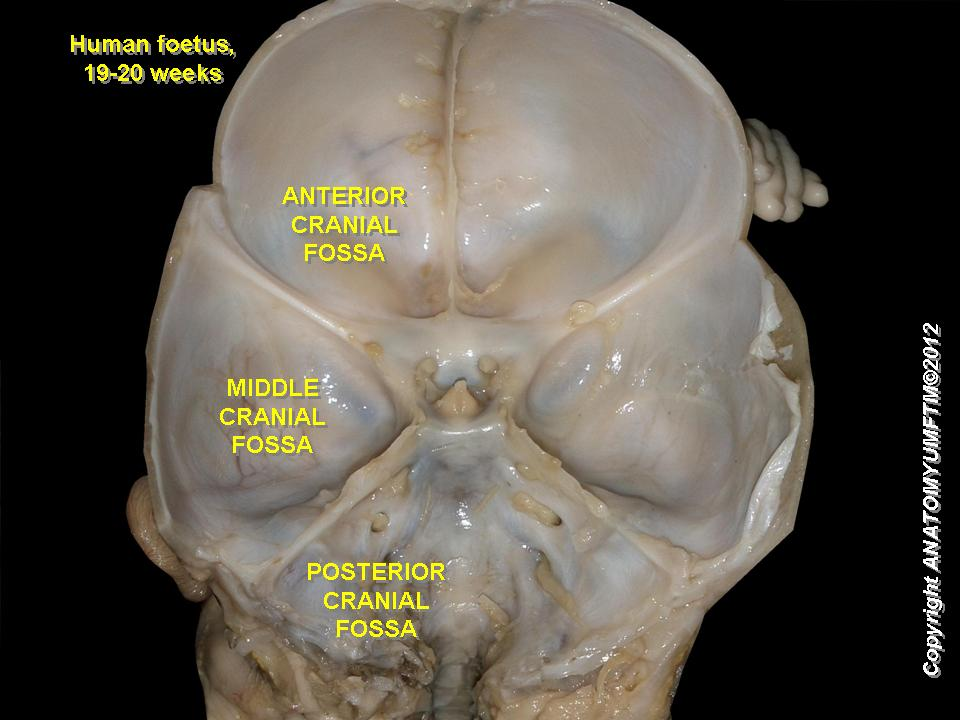
Middle cranial fossa at human foetus

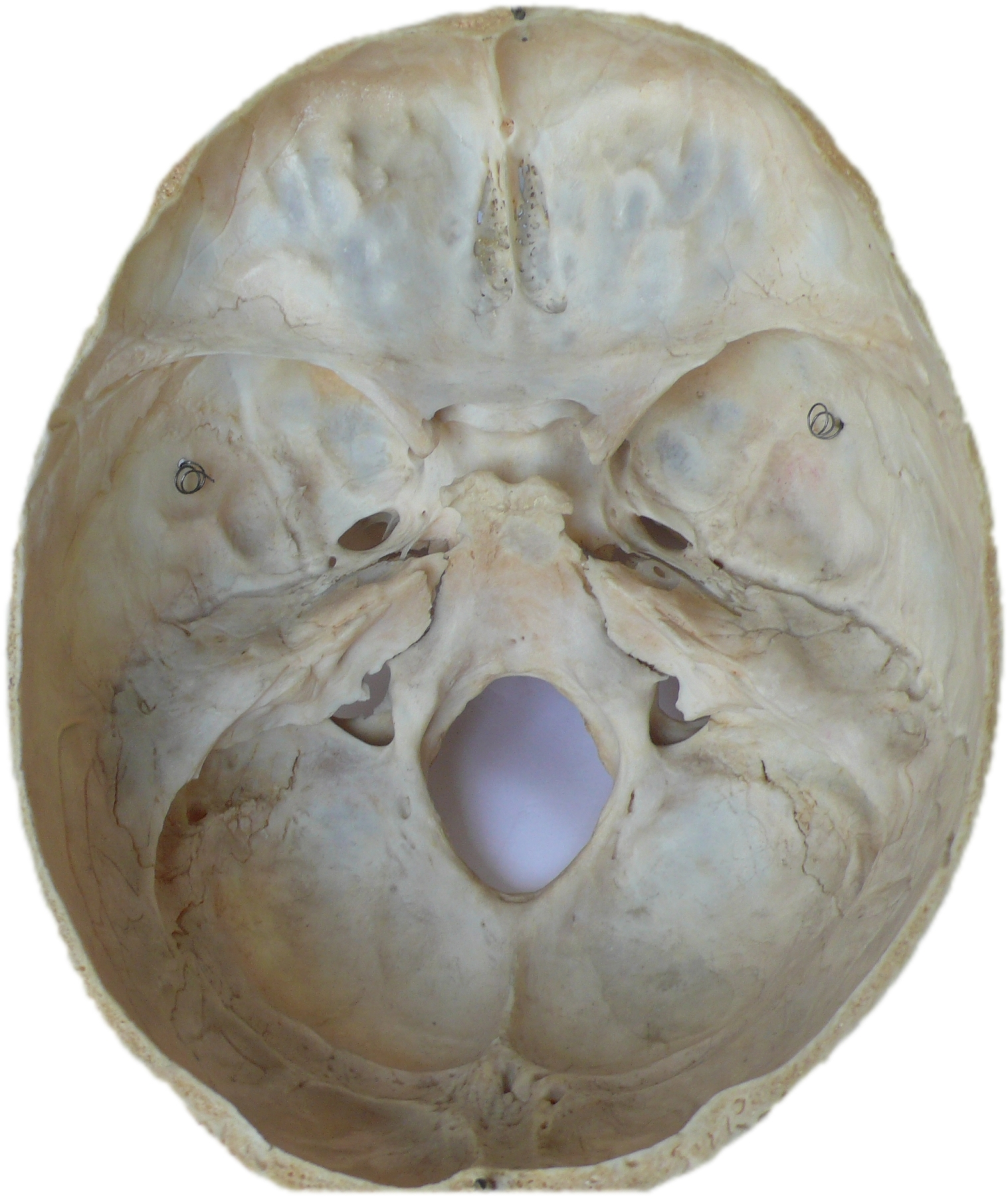
Base of skull

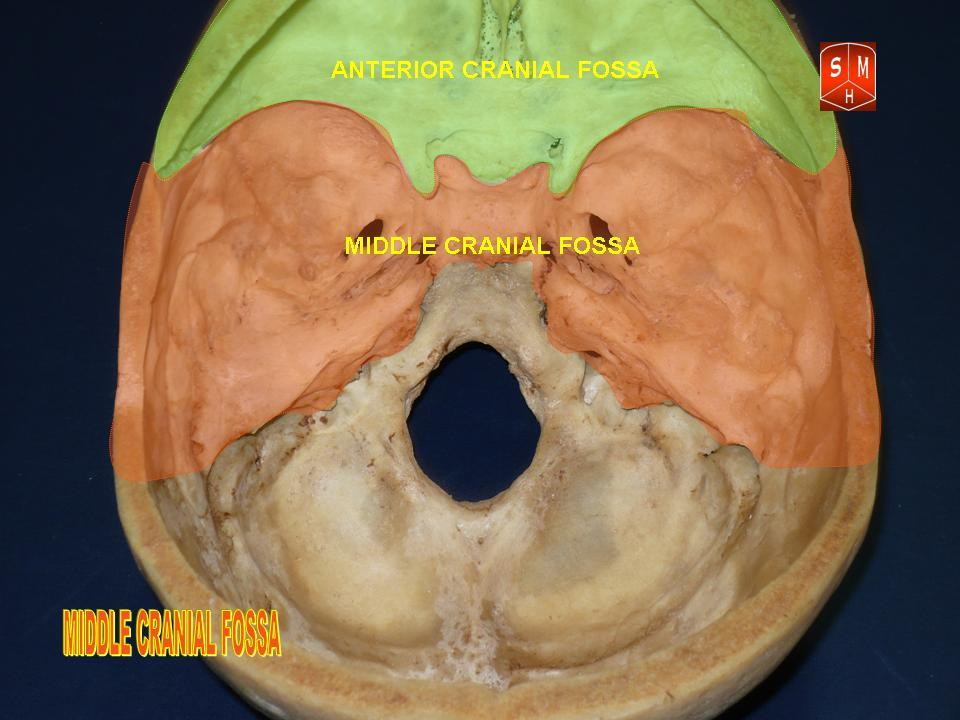
Middle cranial fossa

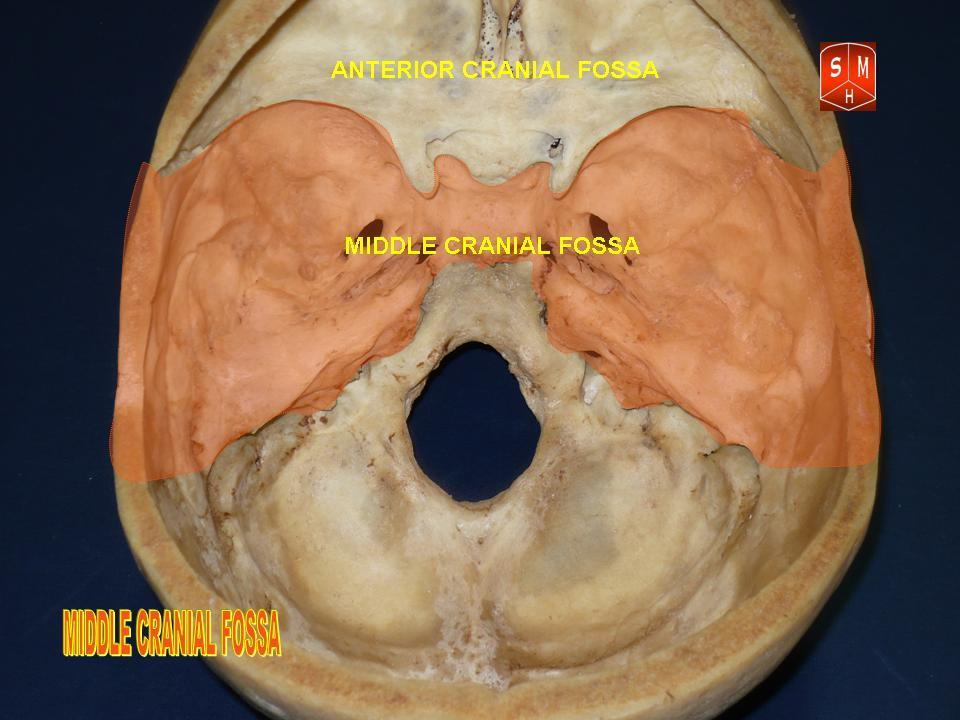
Middle cranial fossa

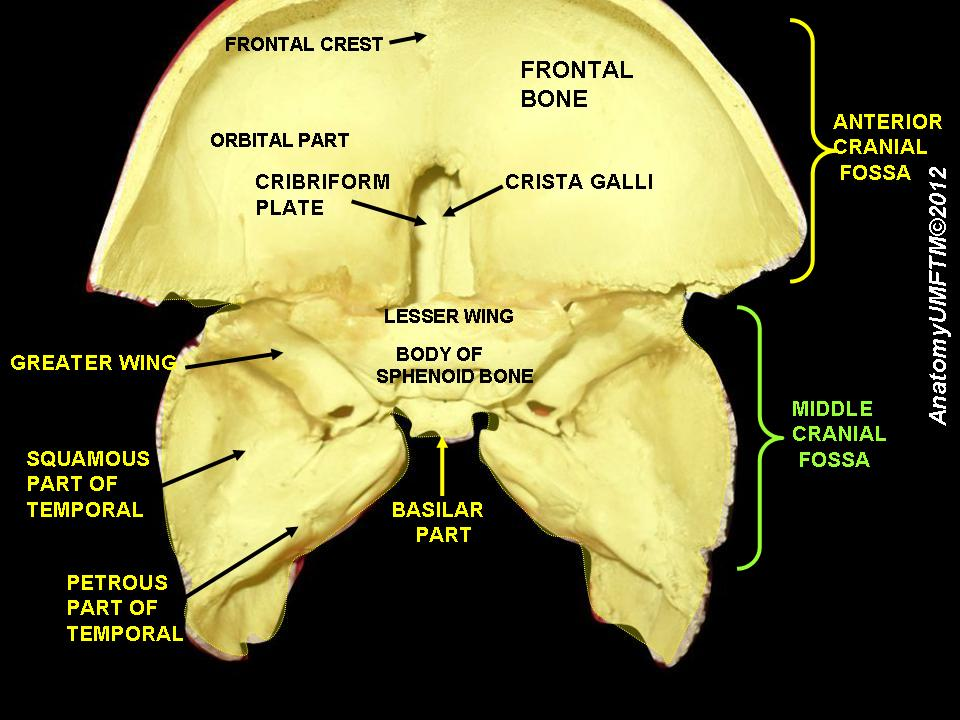
Middle cranial fossa
