= Deep temporal nerves =

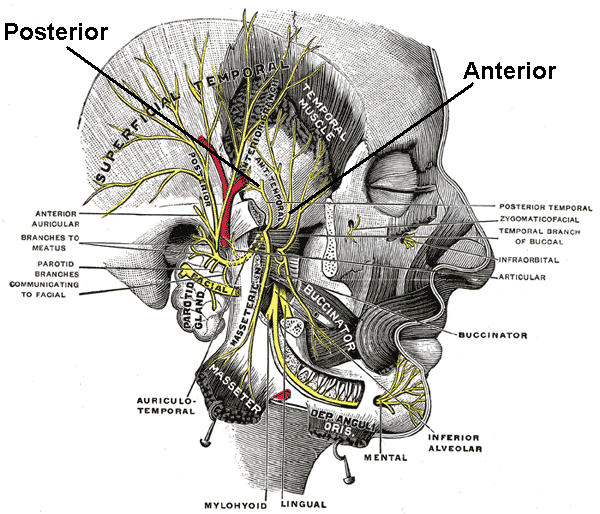
- Mandibular division of the trigeminal nerve

Details
- From: Anterior division of mandibular nerve
- Innervates: Temporalis, temporomandibular joint

Identifiers
- Latin: nervi temporales profundi
- TA98: A14.2.01.071
- TA2: 6254
- FMA: 53187

The deep temporal nerves are motor branches of the mandibular nerve (CN V_{3}). They originate in the infratemporal region and ascend deep to the temporalis muscle. These nerves provide motor innervation to the temporalis muscle, which elevates the mandible during chewing. The deep temporal nerves are relevant in surgical procedures and conditions affecting the infratemporal fossa and temporalis muscle.

== Structure ==
=== Origin ===
They usually arise from (the anterior division of) the mandibular nerve (CN V_{3}).

=== Course ===
They pass superior to the superior border of the lateral pterygoid muscle. They ascend to the temporal fossa and enter the deep surface of the temporalis muscle.

=== Distribution ===
The deep temporal nerves provide motor innervation to the temporalis muscle. The deep temporal nerves also have articular branches which provide a minor contribution to the innervation of the temporomandibular joint.

=== Variation ===
Number

There are usually two deep temporal nerves - the anterior deep temporal nerve and posterior deep temporal nerve. Occasionally, a third one is present - the middle deep temporal nerve.

Origin

The anterior one may arise from the buccal nerve, and the posterior one may arise from the masseteric nerve.
