= Meningeal branch of the mandibular nerve =

Branch of the mandibular nerve

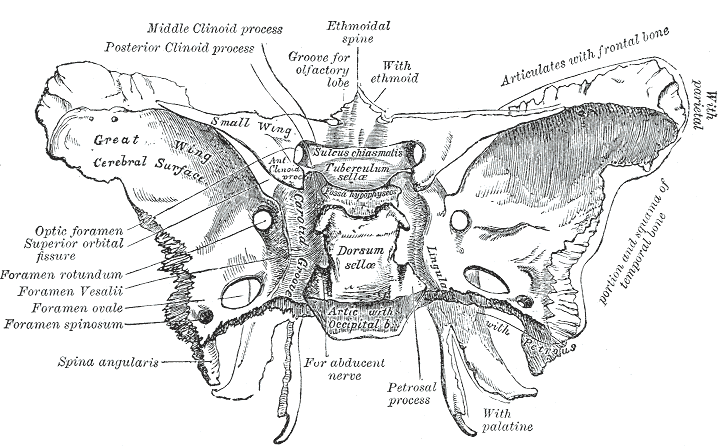
- Sphenoid bone. Upper surface. (Foramen spinosum labeled left, second from bottom.)

Details
- From: Mandibular nerve
- Innervates: Dura mater

Identifiers
- Latin: ramus meningeus nervi mandibularis
- TA98: A14.2.01.065
- TA2: 6247
- FMA: 53047

The meningeal branch of the mandibular nerve (also known as the nervus spinosus) is a sensory branch of the mandibular nerve (CN V3). It arises in the infratemporal fossa and reenters the middle cranial fossa through either the foramen spinosum or foramen ovale. The nerve innervates portions of the meninges of this fossa as well as the mastoid air cells. The meningeal branch of the mandibular nerve is clinically relevant in conditions involving meningeal irritation and in surgical procedures that involve the middle cranial fossa or adjacent structures.

== Anatomy ==
=== Branches ===
It divides into two branches - anterior and posterior - which accompany the main divisions of the middle meningeal artery and supply the dura mater:

- The anterior branch communicates with the meningeal branch of the maxillary nerve.
- The posterior branch also supplies the mucous lining of the mastoid cells.
