= Meningeal branch of occipital artery =

Details

Identifiers
- Latin: ramus meningeus arteriae occipitalis
- TA98: A12.2.05.035
- TA2: 4403
- FMA: 49618

The meningeal branch of occipital artery ascends with the internal jugular vein, and enters the skull through the jugular foramen and condyloid canal, to supply the dura mater in the posterior fossa.
