= Spine of sphenoid bone =

Lowest part of the front of the skull behind the eye socket

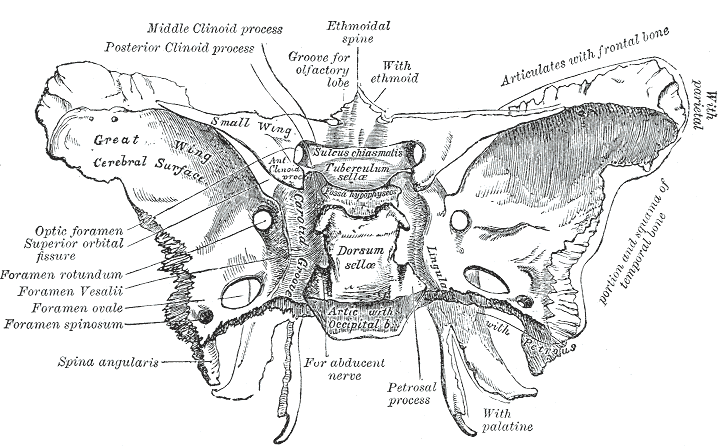
- Sphenoid bone. Upper surface. (Spina angularis labeled at bottom left.)

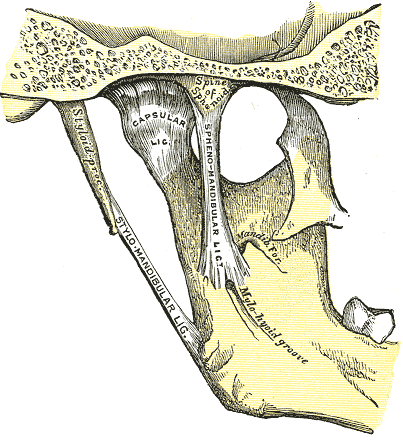
- Articulation of the mandible. Medial aspect. (Spine of sphenoid labeled at center top.)

Details

Identifiers
- Latin: spina ossis sphenoidalis, processus spinosus ossis sphenoidalis
- TA98: A02.1.05.040
- TA2: 626
- FMA: 54777

The sphenoidal spine (Latin: "spina angularis") is a downwardly directed process at the apex of the great wings of the sphenoid bone that serves as the origin of the sphenomandibular ligament.

== Additional images ==
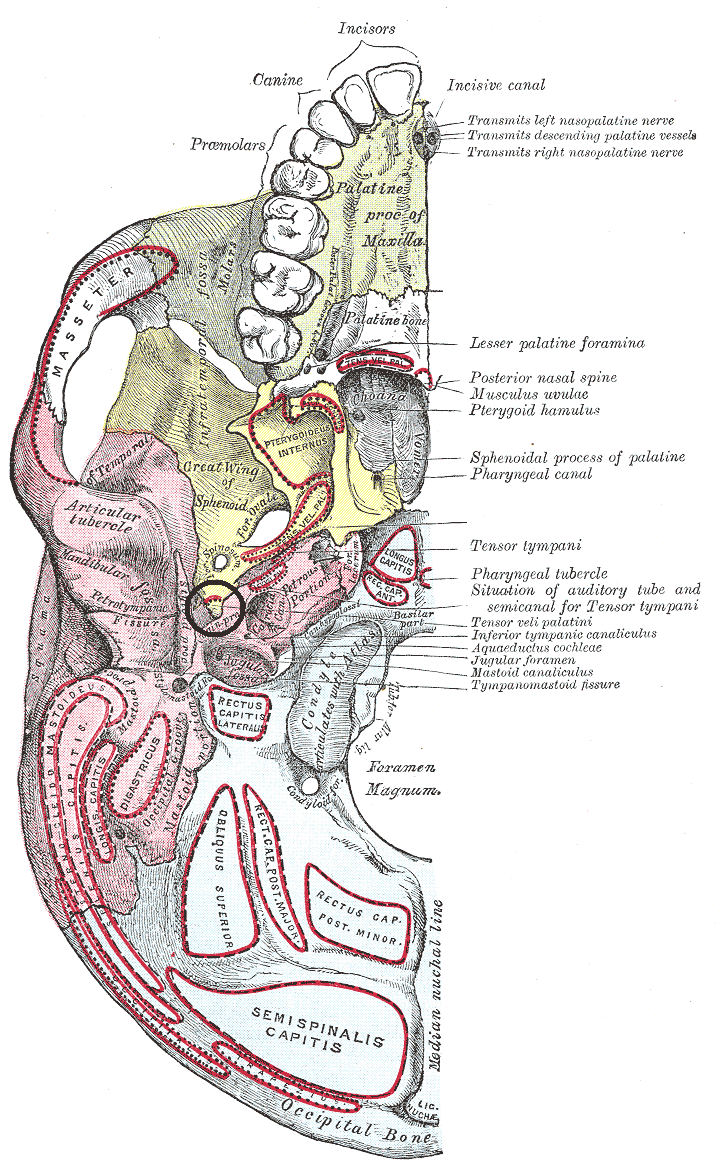
Base of skull. Inferior surface. Spine of sphenoid bone marked with black circle
