= Foramen rotundum =

Hole in the sphenoid bone of the skull

Foramen rotundum of Sphenoid
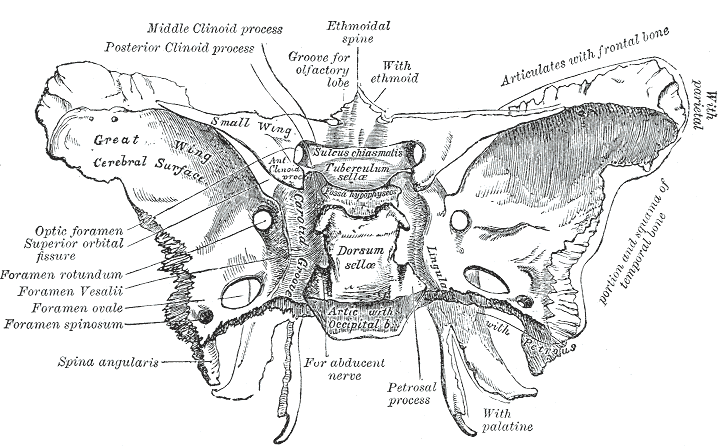
- Sphenoid bone. Upper surface. (Foramen rotundum labeled at center left)

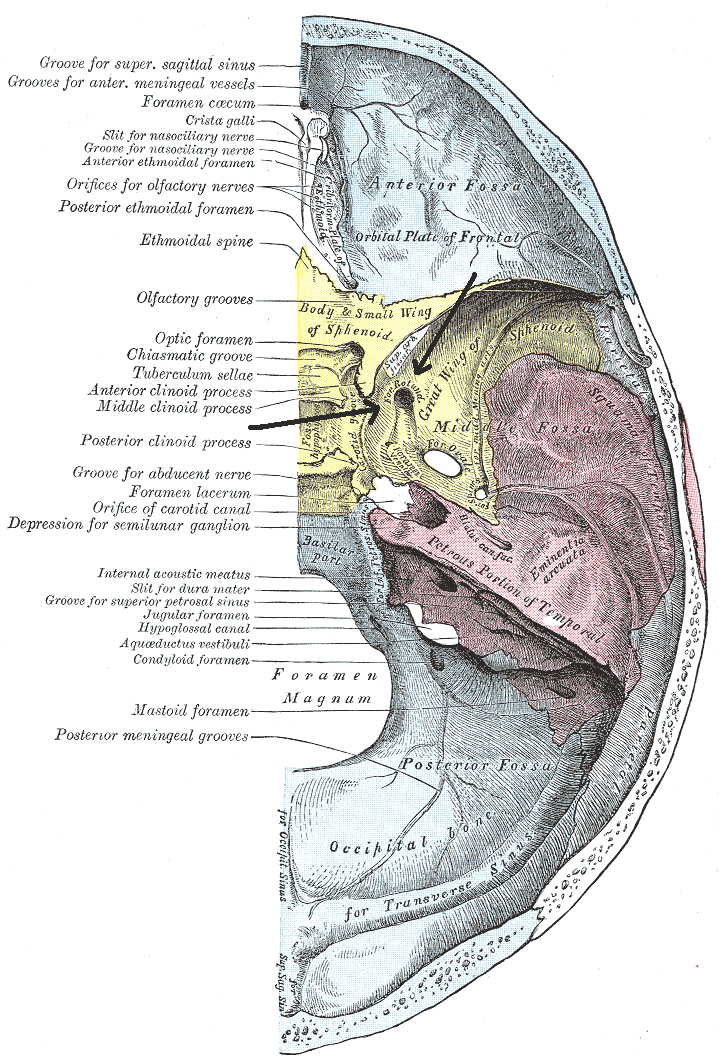
- Base of the skull. Upper surface. Sphenoid is yellow, and arrows indicate the foramen rotundum.)

Details
- Part of: Sphenoid bone
- System: Skeletal

Identifiers
- Latin: foramen rotundum ossis sphenoidalis
- TA98: A02.1.05.035
- TA2: 621
- FMA: 53154

The foramen rotundum is a circular hole in the sphenoid bone of the skull. It connects the middle cranial fossa and the pterygopalatine fossa. It allows for the passage of the maxillary nerve (V_{2}), a branch of the trigeminal nerve.

== Structure ==
The foramen rotundum is one of the several circular apertures (the foramina) located in the base of the skull, in the anterior and medial part of the sphenoid bone.

The mean area of the foramina rotunda is not considerable, which may suggest that they play a minor role in the dynamics of blood circulation in the venous system of the head.

=== Development ===
The foramen rotundum evolves in shape throughout the fetal period, and from birth to adolescence. It achieves a perfect ring-shaped formation in the fetus after the 4th fetal month. It is mostly oval-shaped in the fetal period, and round-shaped after birth (generally speaking). After birth, the rotundum is about 2.5 mm and in 15- to 17-year-olds about 3 mm in length. The average diameter of the foramen rotundum in adults is 3.55 mm.

== Function ==
The foramen rotundum allows the passage of the maxillary nerve (V_{2}), a branch of the trigeminal nerve. It also allows the passage of the artery of the foramen rotundum and an emissary vein.

== History ==
=== Etymology ===
Foramen is the Latin term designating a hole-like opening. It derives from the Latin forare meaning to bore or perforate. Here, the opening is round as indicated by the Latin rotundum meaning round.

== See also ==
- Foramen ovale
- Foramen spinosum
- Foramina of skull
