= Temporal fossa =

Shallow depression on the side of the human skull

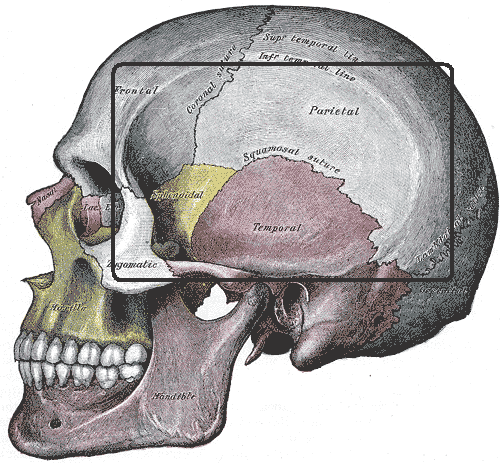
- The temporal fossa is clearly visible in this picture

Details

Identifiers
- Latin: fossa temporalis
- TA98: A02.1.00.022
- TA2: 426
- FMA: 75307

The temporal fossa is a fossa (shallow depression) on the side of the skull bounded by the temporal lines above, and the zygomatic arch below. Its floor is formed by the outer surfaces of four bones of the skull. The fossa is filled by the temporalis muscle.

== Anatomy ==
=== Boundaries ===
- Medial/floor: frontal bone, parietal bone, (squamous part of) temporal bone, and sphenoid bone. The floor of the fossa features the pterion (the junction of these four bones).
- Lateral/roof: temporal fascia.
- Anterior: (posterior surface of) the frontal process of zygomatic bone, (the posterior surface of) the zygomatic process of frontal bone, and the maxilla.
- Superior: Pair of temporal lines (superior and inferior temporal lines) that arch across the skull from the zygomatic process of the frontal bone to the supramastoid crest of the temporal bone
- Inferior: zygomatic arch laterally and by the infratemporal crest of the greater wing of the sphenoid medially.

=== Contents ===
- Temporalis muscle
- Deep temporal arteries
- Deep temporal nerves
- Zygomaticotemporal nerve

=== Relations ===
Deep to the zygomatic arch, the temporal fossa is inferiorly continuous with the (lateral part of) the infratemporal fossa.

== Additional images ==
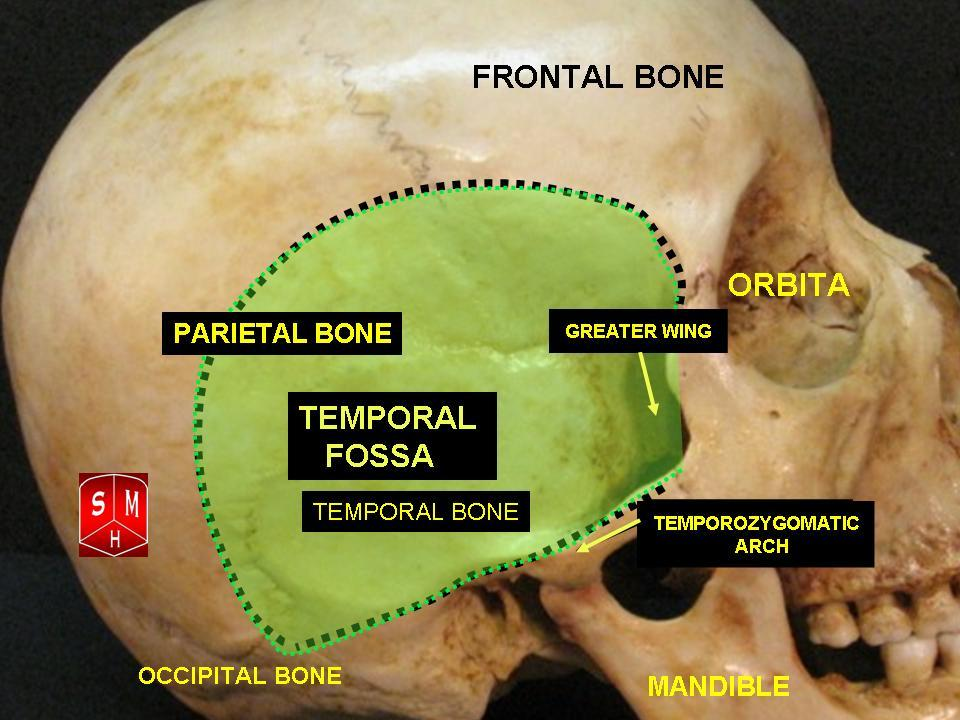
Temporal fossa
