= Accessory meningeal artery =

- Plan of branches of maxillary artery (accessory meningeal visible top left)

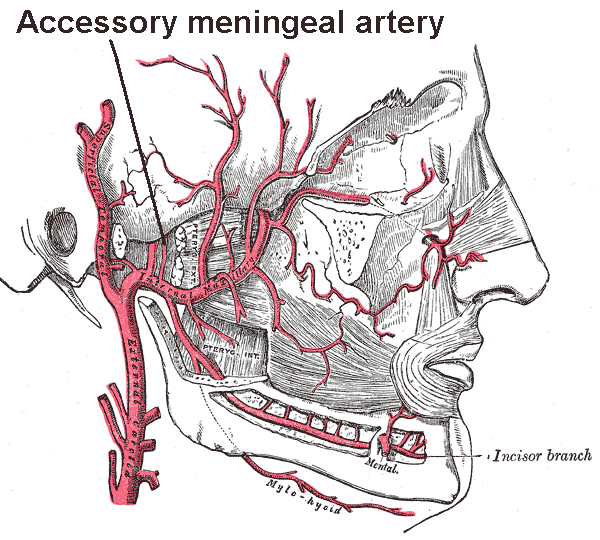
- Plan of branches of maxillary artery

Details
- Source: Maxillary artery
- Supplies: Meninges

Identifiers
- Latin: ramus accessorius arteriae meningeae mediae
- TA98: A12.2.05.062
- TA2: 4432
- FMA: 79467 49715, 79467

The accessory meningeal artery (also accessory branch of middle meningeal artery, pterygomeningeal artery, small meningeal or parvidural branch) is a branch of the maxillary artery that ascends through the foramen ovale to enter the cranial cavity and supply the dura mater of the floor of the middle cranial fossa and of the trigeminal cave, and to the trigeminal ganglion (representing the main source of artierial blood for this ganglion).

== Structure ==
=== Variation ===
The artery sometimes instead arises from the middle meningeal artery.

== Nomenclature ==
Only about 10% of the blood flowing through this artery reaches intracranial structures. The remaining blood flow is dispersed to extracranial structures around the infratemporal fossa.

Reflecting this fact, Terminologia Anatomica lists entries for both "accessory branch of middle meningeal artery" and "pterygomeningeal artery".
