= Middle meningeal artery =

Artery supplying the meninges

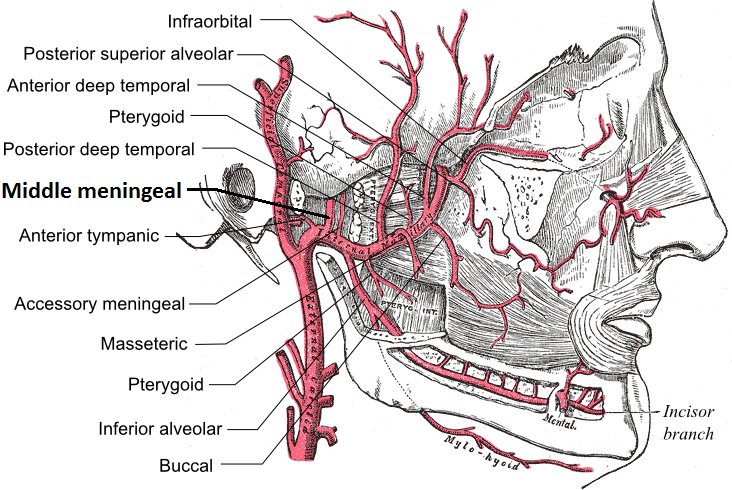
- Plan of branches of the maxillary artery.

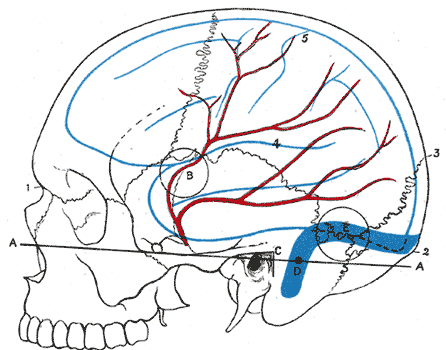
- Relations of the brain and middle meningeal artery to the surface of the skull.

Details
- Source: Maxillary artery
- Branches: Anterior: posterior: superior tympanic artery
- Vein: Middle meningeal vein
- Supplies: Meninges

Identifiers
- Latin: arteria meningea media
- TA98: A12.2.05.061
- TA2: 4431
- FMA: 49711

The middle meningeal artery (Latin: arteria meningea media) is typically the third branch of the first portion of the maxillary artery. After branching off the maxillary artery in the infratemporal fossa, it runs through the foramen spinosum to supply the dura mater (the outer meningeal layer) and the calvaria. The middle meningeal artery is the largest of the three (paired) arteries that supply the meninges, the others being the anterior meningeal artery and the posterior meningeal artery.

The anterior branch of the middle meningeal artery runs beneath the pterion. It is vulnerable to injury at this point, where the skull is thin. Rupture of the artery may give rise to an epidural hematoma. In the dry cranium, the middle meningeal, which runs within the dura mater surrounding the brain, makes a deep groove in the calvarium.

The middle meningeal artery is intimately associated with the auriculotemporal nerve, which wraps around the artery making the two easily identifiable in the dissection of human cadavers and also easily damaged in surgery.

== Structure ==
It ascends between the sphenomandibular ligament and the lateral pterygoid muscle, and between the two roots of the auriculotemporal nerve to the foramen spinosum of the sphenoid bone, through which it enters the cranium; it then runs forward in a groove on the great wing of the sphenoid bone, and divides into two branches, anterior and posterior.

The anterior branch, the larger, crosses the great wing of the sphenoid, reaches the groove, or canal, in the sphenoidal angle of the parietal bone, and then divides into branches that spread out between the dura mater and internal surface of the cranium, some passing upward as far as the vertex, and others backward to the occipital region.

The posterior branch curves backward on the squamous part of the temporal bone, and, reaching the parietal bone some distance in front of its mastoid angle, divides into branches that supply the posterior part of the dura mater and cranium.

The branches of the middle meningeal artery are distributed partly to the dura mater, but chiefly to the bones; they anastomose with the arteries of the opposite side, and with the anterior and posterior meningeal arteries. The very smallest distal branches anastomose through the skull with small arterioles from the scalp.

On entering the cranium, the middle meningeal artery gives off the following branches:

1. Numerous small vessels supply the trigeminal ganglion and the dura mater
2. A superficial petrosal branch enters the hiatus of the facial canal, supplies the facial nerve, and anastomoses with the stylomastoid branch of the posterior auricular artery.
3. A superior tympanic artery runs in the canal of the tensor tympani muscle, and supplies this muscle and the lining of the canal.
4. Orbital branches pass through the superior orbital fissure or through separate canals in the great wing of the sphenoid, to anastomose with the lacrimal or other branches of the ophthalmic artery.
5. Temporal branches pass through foramina in the great wing of the sphenoid, and anastomose in the temporal fossa with the deep temporal arteries.

=== Variation ===
In approximately half of subjects, it branches into an accessory meningeal artery.

Very rarely, the ophthalmic artery may arise as a branch of the middle meningeal artery.

The middle meningeal artery may arise not only from the maxillary artery but also from the ophthalmic artery, or lacrimal artery.

== Clinical relevance ==
An injured middle meningeal artery is the most common cause of an epidural hematoma. A head injury (e.g., from a road traffic accident or sports injury) is required to rupture the artery. Emergency treatment requires decompression of the hematoma, usually by craniotomy. Subdural bleeding is usually venous in nature, rather than arterial. Nevertheless, embolization of the middle meningeal artery (as a supplementary treatment to craniotomy) significantly reduces the likelihood of recurrence and reoperation for subdural hematomas, as the artery supplies blood to the vascularized membrane around the hematoma that leaks blood and prevents its resorption.

The middle meningeal artery runs in a groove on the inside of the cranium. This can clearly be seen on a lateral skull X-ray, where it may be mistaken for a fracture of the skull. On a dry specimen, the groove is easy to see. This means that the artery is easy to study, even in specimens centuries old, and several classifications of the branches have been proposed, e.g. Adachi's classification of 1928.

== Additional images ==
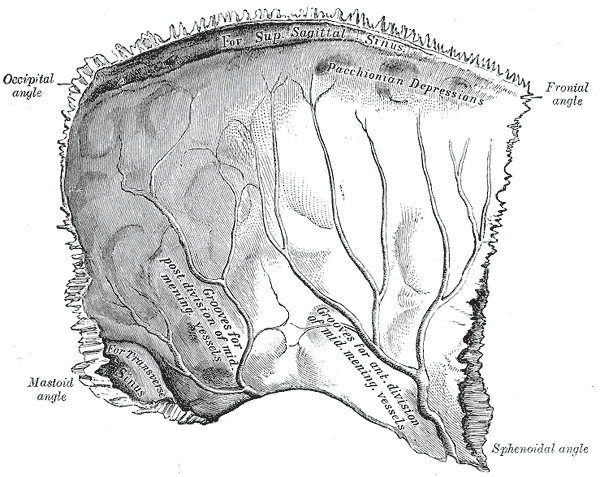
Left parietal bone. Inner surface.

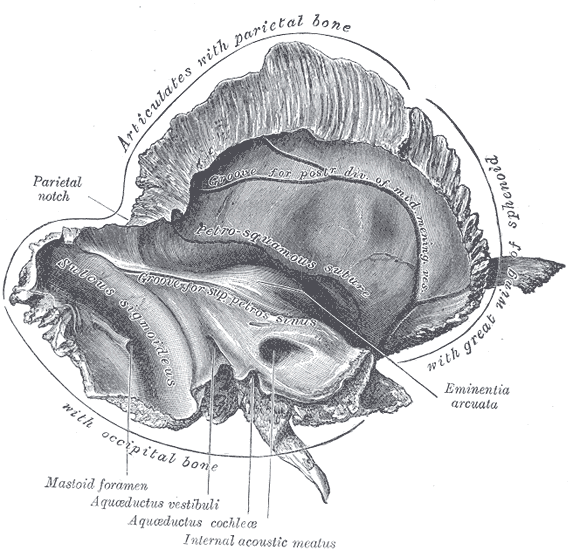
Left temporal bone. Inner surface.

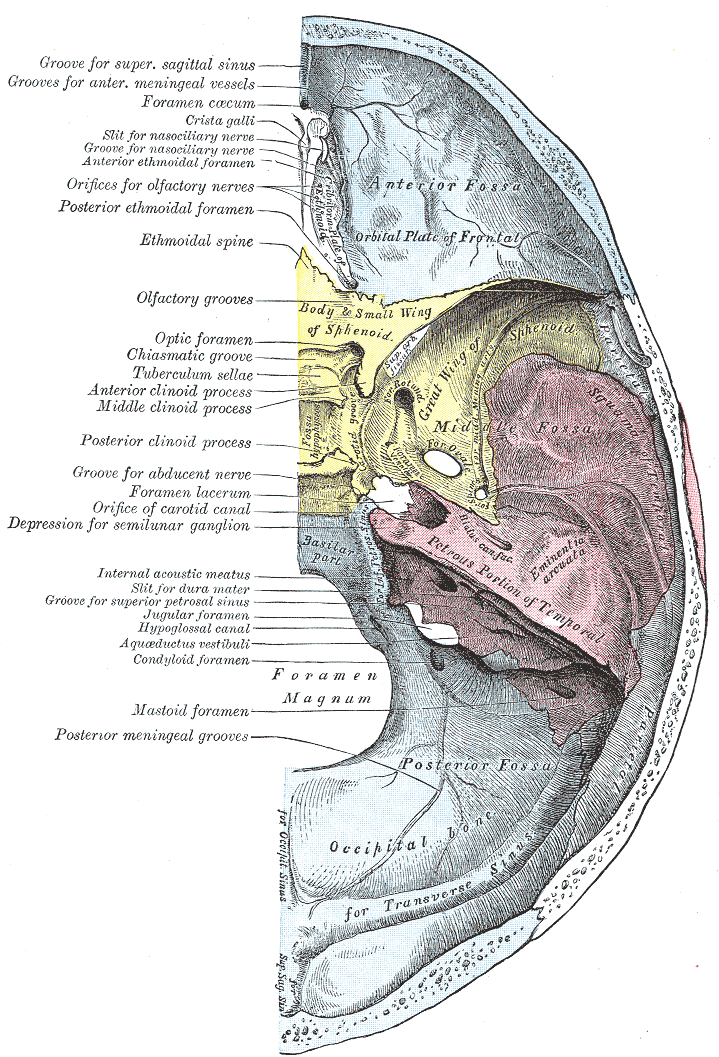
Base of the skull. Upper surface.

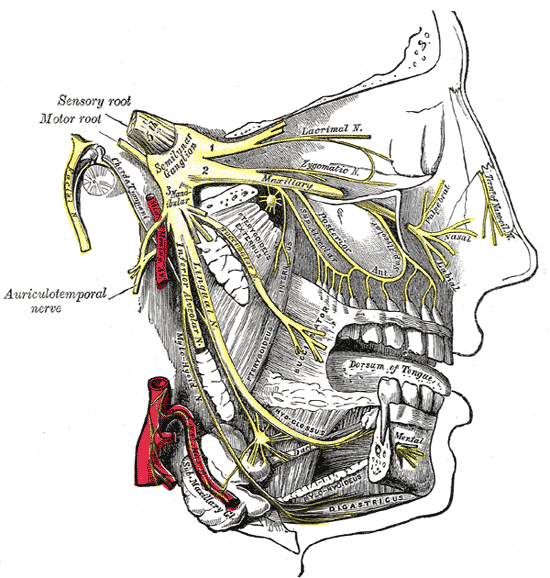
Distribution of the maxillary and mandibular nerves, and the submaxillary ganglion.

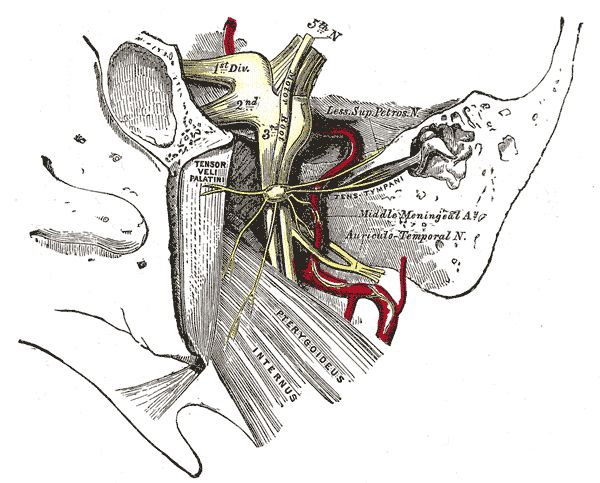
The otic ganglion and its branches.

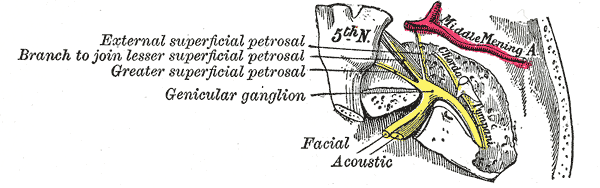
The course and connections of the facial nerve in the temporal bone.

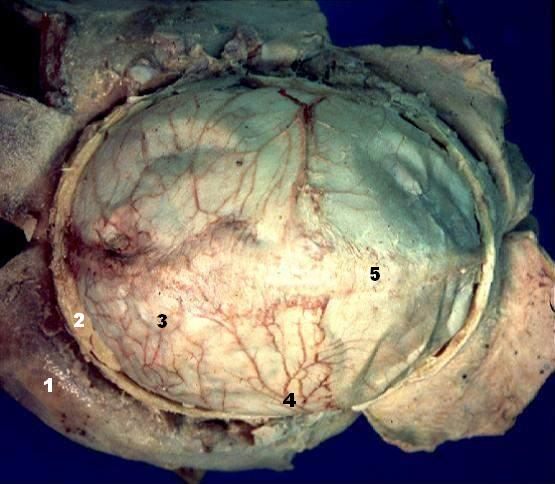
Human brain dura mater

== See also ==
- Foramen spinosum
- Maxillary artery
