= Sphenomandibular ligament =

Ligament of the skull

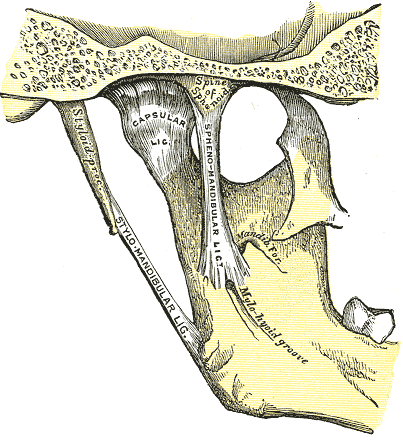
- Articulation of the mandible. Medial aspect. (Spheno-mandibular lig. labeled vertically at center.)

Details
- From: Spine of sphenoid bone
- To: Mandibular foramen

Identifiers
- Latin: ligamentum sphenomandibulare
- TA98: A03.1.07.007
- TA2: 1568
- FMA: 57077

The sphenomandibular ligament (internal lateral ligament) is one of the three ligaments of the temporomandibular joint. It is situated medially to - and generally separate from - the articular capsule of the joint. Superiorly, it is attached to the spine of the sphenoid bone; inferiorly, it is attached to the lingula of mandible. The SML acts to limit inferior-ward movement of the mandible.

The SML is derived from Meckel's cartilage.

== Anatomy ==
The SML is a tough,'flat, thin band. It broadens inferiorly, measuring about 12 mm in width on average at the point of its inferior attachment.

It is derived from the perichondrium of Meckel's cartilage.

=== Attachments ===
Superiorly, the SML is attached to the spine of the sphenoid bone (spina angularis by a narrow attachment.

Inferiorly, it is attached at to lingula of mandible and the inferior margin of the mandibular foramen.

=== Anatomical relations ===
The lateral pterygoid muscle, auriculotemporal nerve, and the maxillary artery and maxillary vein are situated laterally to the SML (the vessels and nerve coursing betwixt the SML, and the neck of the mandibular condyle).

The chorda tympani nerve is situated medially to the SML near its upper end.

The medial pterygoid muscle is situated inferolaterally to the SML.

The inferior alveolar nerve, artery and vein, and a parotid lobule are situated anteroinferiorly to the SML (all being interposed between the SML and the ramus of mandible).

The SML is pierced by the mylohyoid nerve (a branch of the inferior alveolvar nerve) and the accompanying mylohyoid artery and vein.

Any remaining space between the SML and mandible is taken up by the parotid gland. Between the SML and the pharynx are situated adipose tissue, and a pharyngeal vein.

== Function ==
The function of the sphenomandibular ligament is to limit distension of the mandible in an inferior direction. It is slack when the temporomandibular joint (TMJ) is in closed position; it is taut when the condyle of the mandible is situated anterior to the temporomandibular ligament. The SML has about 5 mm of slack when the jaw is closed; it becomes taut when the jaw is open roughly half-way.
