= Mandibular nerve =

Branch of the trigeminal nerve responsible for the lower face and jaw

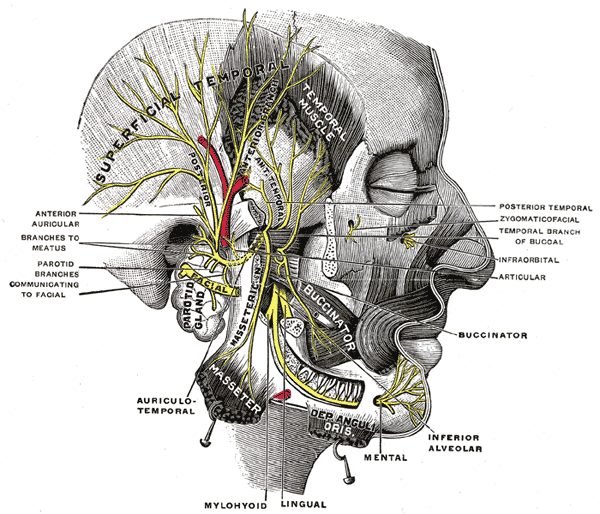
- Mandibular division of the trigeminal nerve.

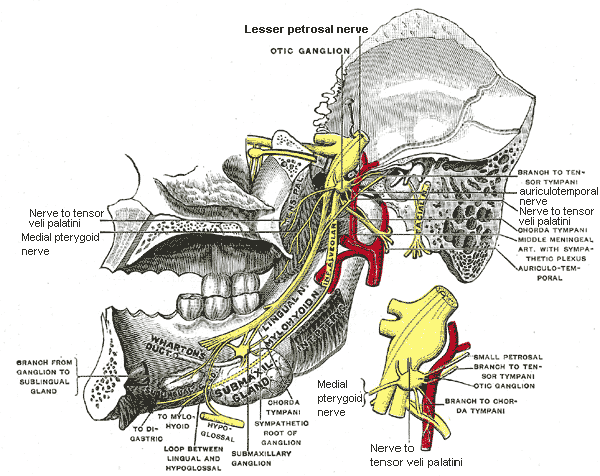
- Mandibular division of trigeminal nerve, seen from the middle line. The small figure is an enlarged view of the otic ganglion.

Details
- From: Trigeminal nerve (CN V)

Identifiers
- Latin: nervus mandibularis
- MeSH: D008340
- TA98: A14.2.01.064
- TA2: 6246
- FMA: 52996

In neuroanatomy, the mandibular nerve (V_{3}) is the largest of the three divisions of the trigeminal nerve, the fifth cranial nerve (CN V). Unlike the other divisions of the trigeminal nerve (ophthalmic nerve, maxillary nerve) which contain only afferent fibers, the mandibular nerve contains both afferent and efferent fibers. These nerve fibers innervate structures of the lower jaw and face, such as the tongue, lower lip, and chin. The mandibular nerve also innervates the muscles of mastication.

== Structure ==
=== Course ===
The large sensory root of mandibular nerve emerges from the lateral part of the trigeminal ganglion and exits the cranial cavity through the foramen ovale. The motor root (Latin: radix motoria s. portio minor), the small motor root of the trigeminal nerve, passes under the trigeminal ganglion and through the foramen ovale to unite with the sensory root just outside the skull.

The mandibular nerve immediately passes between tensor veli palatini, which is medial, and lateral pterygoid, which is lateral, and gives off a meningeal branch (nervus spinosus) and the nerve to medial pterygoid from its medial side. The nerve then divides into a small anterior division and a large posterior division.

=== Branches ===
The mandibular nerve gives off the following branches:

- From the main trunk (before the division):
  - meningeal branch (nervus spinosus) (sensory)
  - medial pterygoid nerve (motor)
- From the anterior division:
  - masseteric nerve (mixed)
  - deep temporal nerves (mixed)
  - buccal nerve (sensory)
  - lateral pterygoid nerve (motor)
- From the posterior division:
  - auriculotemporal nerve (sensory)
  - lingual nerve (sensory)
  - inferior alveolar nerve (mixed)
    - mylohyoid nerve (motor)
    - incisive branch (sensory)
    - mental nerve (sensory)

=== Distribution ===
Anterior Division

(Motor Innervation - Muscles of mastication)

- Masseteric nerve
  - Masseter muscle
- Medial pterygoid nerve
  - Medial pterygoid muscle
  - Tensor tympani muscle
  - Tensor veli palatini (via tensor veli palatini branch)
- Lateral pterygoid nerve
  - Lateral pterygoid muscle
- Deep temporal nerve
  - Temporalis muscle

(Sensory Innervation)

- Buccal nerve
  - Inside of the cheek (buccal mucosa)
- Nervous spinosus (sensory)

Posterior Division

Lingual Split
(general sensory innervation (not special sensory for taste))

- Anterior 2/3 of Tongue (mucous membrane)

Inferior Alveolar Split
(Motor Innervation)

- Mylohyoid
- Digastric (Anterior Belly)

(Sensory Innervation)

- Teeth and Mucoperiosteum of mandibular teeth
- Chin and Lower Lip

Auriculotemporal Split

- Scalp (auricula / temporal region)

== See also ==
- Ophthalmic nerve
- Maxillary nerve
- Marginal mandibular branch of facial nerve
- Alveolar nerve (Dental nerve)

== Additional images ==
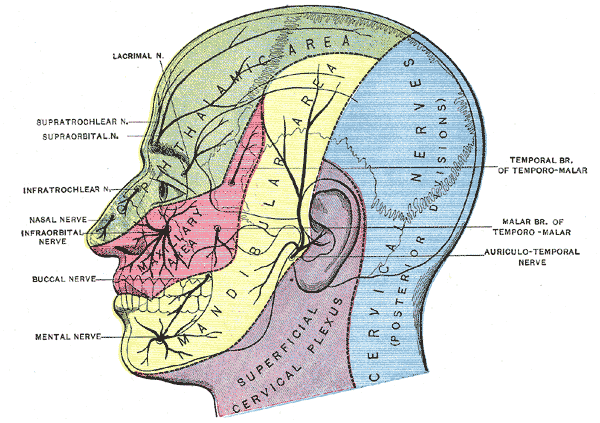
Dermatome distribution of the trigeminal nerve

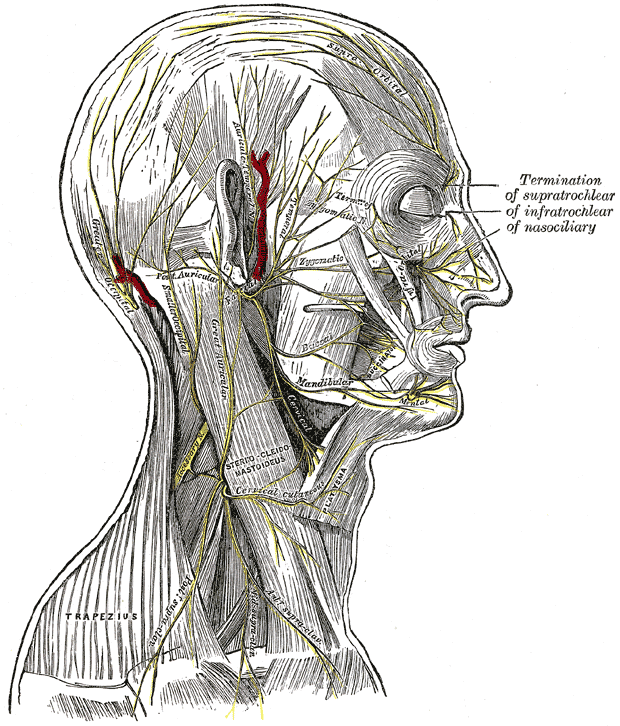
The nerves of the scalp, face, and side of neck.

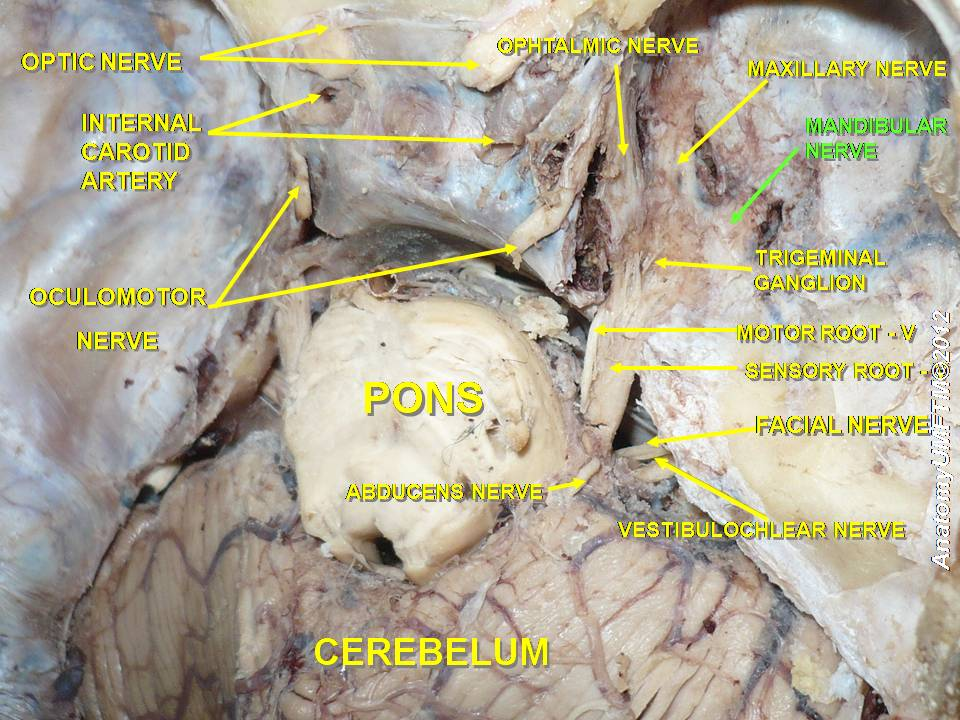
Mandibular nerve

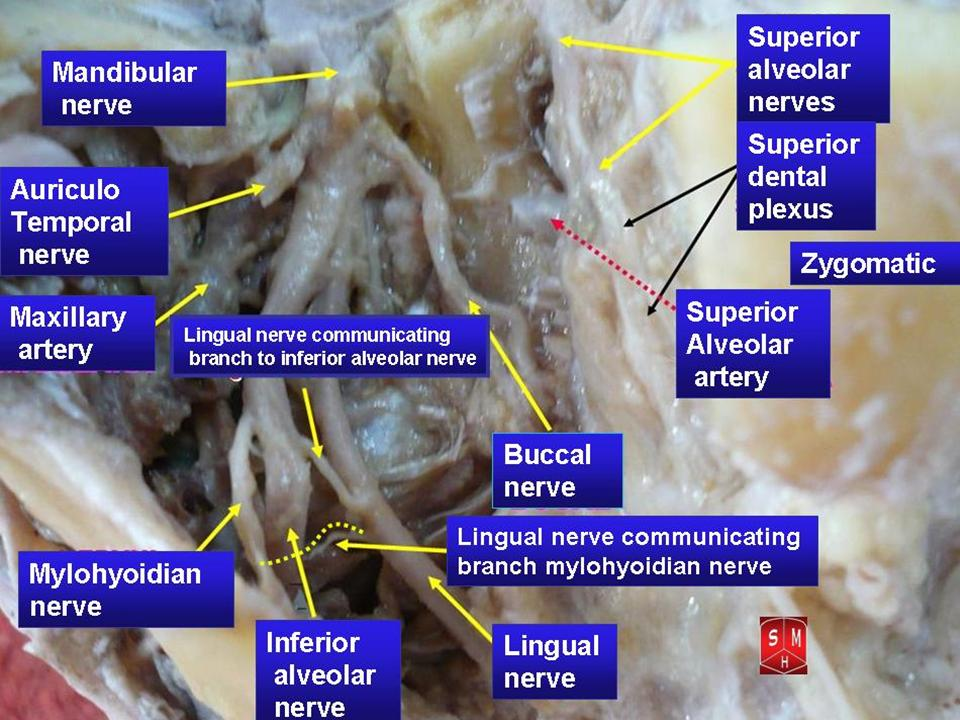
Mandibular nerve
