= Foramen ovale (skull) =

Hole in the sphenoid bone of the skull

Foramen ovale of sphenoid bone
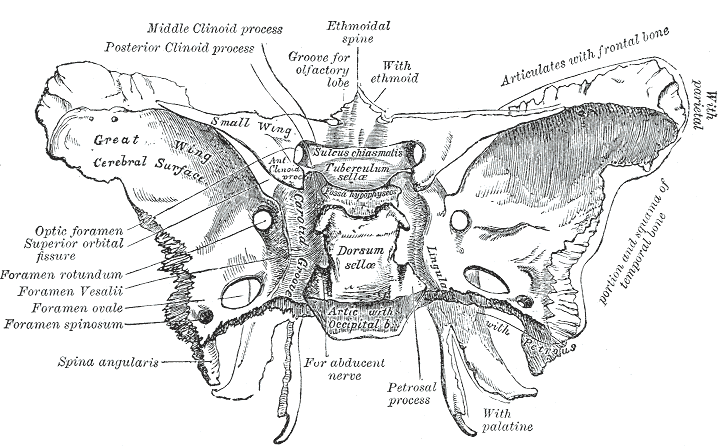
- Sphenoid bone. Upper surface. (foramen ovale labeled at left, third from bottom)

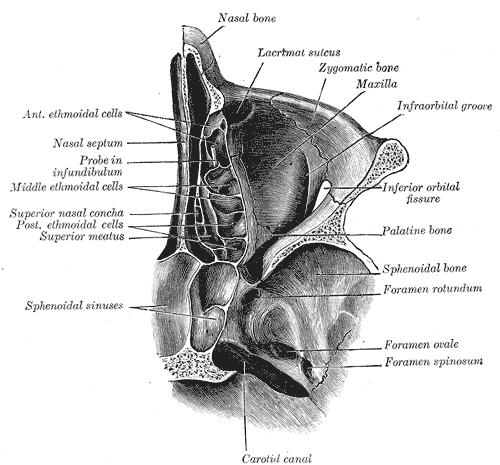
- Horizontal section of nasal and orbital cavities.

Details
- Part of: Sphenoid bone
- System: Skeletal

Identifiers
- Latin: foramen ovale ossis sphenoidalis
- TA98: A02.1.05.036
- TA2: 622
- FMA: 53155

The foramen ovale (En: oval window) is a hole in the posterior part of the sphenoid bone, posterolateral to the foramen rotundum. It is one of the larger of the several holes (the foramina) in the skull. It transmits the mandibular nerve, a branch of the trigeminal nerve.

== Structure ==
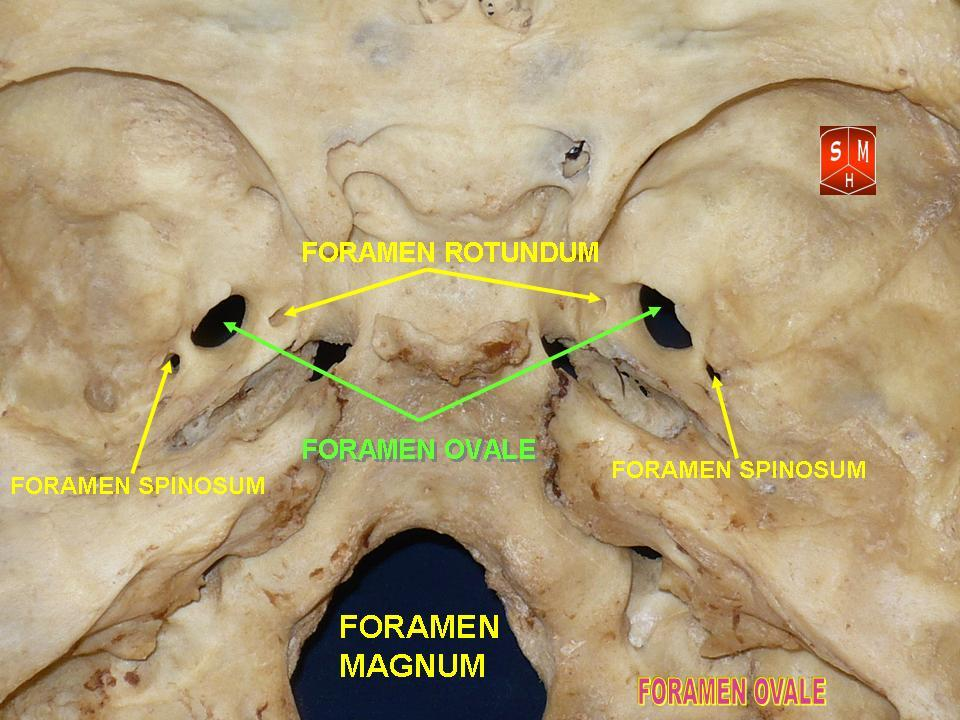
Foramen ovale

The foramen ovale is an opening in the greater wing of the sphenoid bone. The foramen ovale is one of two cranial foramina in the greater wing, the other being the foramen spinosum. The foramen ovale is posterolateral to the foramen rotundum and anteromedial to the foramen spinosum. Posterior and medial to the foramen is the opening for the carotid canal.

=== Contents ===
The following structures pass through foramen ovale:

- mandibular nerve (CN V_{3}) (a branch of the trigeminal nerve (CN V))
- accessory meningeal artery
- lesser petrosal nerve (a branch of the glossopharyngeal nerve)
- an emissary vein connecting the cavernous sinus with the pterygoid plexus
- (occasionally) meningeal branch of the mandibular nerve

=== Variation ===
In a study conducted on 100 skulls, the foramen ovale was divided into 2 or 3 components in 4.5% of the cases. The borders of the foramen in some skulls were also irregular and rough. This may suggest, based on radiological images, the presence of morbid changes, which might be the sole anatomical variation in the foramina ovalia of humans.

In newborn, the foramen ovale is about 3.85 mm and in the adults about 7.2 mm in length. The average maximal length is about 7.48 mm and its average minimal length is 4.17 mm in the adult. The width extends from 1.81 mm in the newborn to 3.7 mm in adults.

=== Development ===
Similar to other foramina, the foramen ovale differs in shape and size throughout life. In a study using over 350 skulls, the earliest perfect ring-shaped formation of the foramen ovale was observed in the 7th month of fetal life, and the latest in 3 years after birth.

== Clinical significance ==
The foramen ovale is used as the entry point into the skull when conducting a percutaneous rhizotomy using either radio-frequency ablation, balloon compression or glycerol injection. These are performed to treat trigeminal neuralgia. In the procedure, the electrode is introduced through the cheek of an anesthetized patient and radiologically guided into the foramen ovale, with the intention of partially or fully ablating one or more of the divisions (typically the mandibular) to relieve pain.

This entry point is also used to surgically place local electrodes directly on the surface of the mesial temporal lobe, in order to observe neural activity of patients with suspected focal epilepsy.

== History ==
=== Etymology ===
The name "foramen ovale" comes from the Latin "oval hole / window".

== See also ==
- Foramina of the skull
