= Ethmoidal nerves =

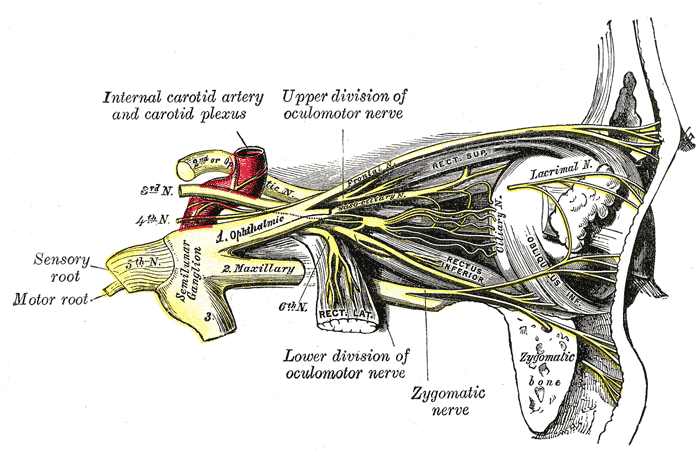
- Nerves of the orbit, and the ciliary ganglion seen from the side

Details
- From: Nasociliary nerve

Identifiers
- Latin: nervi ethmoidales

The ethmoidal nerves, which arise from the nasociliary nerve, supply the ethmoidal cells; the posterior branch leaves the orbital cavity through the posterior ethmoidal foramen and gives some filaments to the sphenoidal sinus. There are two ethmoidal nerves on each side of the face:

- posterior ethmoidal nerve
- anterior ethmoidal nerve
