= Roots of the ciliary ganglion =

Group of nerve fibers

Ciliary ganglion
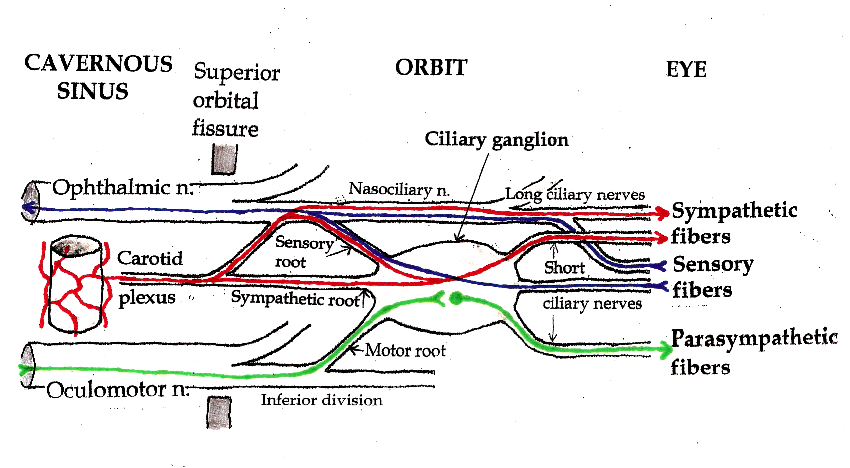
- Pathways in the ciliary ganglion. Green = parasympathetic; Red = sympathetic; Blue = sensory

The ciliary ganglion is a parasympathetic ganglion located just behind the eye in the posterior orbit. Three types of axons enter the ciliary ganglion but only the preganglionic parasympathetic axons synapse there. The entering axons are arranged into three roots of the ciliary ganglion, which join enter the posterior surface of the ganglion.

== Sympathetic root ==
The sympathetic root of ciliary ganglion is one of three roots of the ciliary ganglion. It contains postganglionic sympathetic fibers whose cell bodies are located in the superior cervical ganglion. Their axons ascend with the internal carotid artery as a plexus of nerves, the internal carotid plexus. Sympathetic fibers supplying the eye separate from the carotid plexus within the cavernous sinus. They run forward through the superior orbital fissure and merge with the long ciliary nerves (branches of the nasociliary nerve) and the short ciliary nerves (from the ciliary ganglion). Sympathetic fibers in the short ciliary nerves pass through the ciliary ganglion without forming synapses.

Preganglionic sympathetic fibers originate from neurons in the intermediolateral column of the thoracic spinal cord, at the level of thoracic spinal nerve 1 (T1) and thoracic spinal nerve 2 (T2). They form synapses in the superior cervical ganglion. The ratio of incoming to outgoing fibers (the “convergence”) in this ganglion is approximately 100:1. Sympathetic motor neurons in the spinal cord are controlled by supranuclear pathways that descend through the brainstem and spinal cord. Interruption of the sympathetic chain at any level (from the brainstem to the ciliary ganglion) will produce pupillary constriction (miosis) and eyelid droop (ptosis) – the classic signs of Horner's syndrome.

Sympathetic fibers from the superior cervical ganglion innervate blood vessels (vasoconstriction), sweat glands, and 4 eye muscles: the dilator pupillae, the superior tarsal muscle, the inferior tarsal muscle and the orbitalis.

The dilator pupillae dilates the pupil; its action is antagonistic to the sphincter pupillae. Pupil size is therefore under the dual control of sympathetic and parasympathetic nerves.

Postsynaptic sympathetic signals that originate in the superior cervical ganglion are carried by the nasociliary nerve or directly extend from the internal carotid plexus and pass through the ciliary ganglion.

The superior tarsal muscle elevates the upper eyelid. The levator palpebrae superioris, which is supplied by a branch of the oculomotor nerve, also elevates the upper eyelid. Eyelid elevation is therefore under both voluntary and involuntary control. Interruption of either pathway will result in eyelid droop (ptosis).

The other two eye muscles with sympathetic supply (the inferior tarsal muscle and the orbitalis) are vestigial in humans. They are variable and often incompletely developed.

== Sensory root ==
Sensory fibers from the eyeball (the cornea, iris, and ciliary body) run posteriorly through the short ciliary nerves and pass through the ciliary ganglion without forming synapses. They leave the ciliary ganglion in the sensory root of ciliary ganglion, which joins the nasociliary nerve—a branch of the ophthalmic nerve. From there, the signal travels back through the ophthalmic nerve to the trigeminal nerve and back into specific nuclei in the thalamus where they are relayed to areas in the cerebral cortex.

The exact distribution of sensory fibers, like the distribution of sympathetic fibers, is anatomically variable. There are other pathways to the eye for both sympathetic and sensory fibers, and the precise anatomy varies from person to person. Since the result is the same regardless of how the fibers reach the eye, the presence of sympathetic and sensory fibers in the ciliary ganglion (the contributions of the “sensory” and “sympathetic” roots) is of no functional significance.

== Parasympathetic root ==
The parasympathetic root of ciliary ganglion provides parasympathetic supply to the ciliary ganglion.

The ciliary ganglion is a parasympathetic ganglion. Incoming parasympathetic nerve fibers form synapses with the dendrites of nerve cells within the ganglion. However, the ciliary ganglion is not simply a relay station connecting preganglionic to postganglionic nerve fibers. There are roughly twice as many incoming parasympathetic fibers as outgoing parasympathetic fibers. Neural processing occurs as incoming signals converge onto target neurons.

Presynaptic parasympathetic fibers originate in the Edinger-Westphal nucleus, the parasympathetic motor nucleus associated with the oculomotor nucleus in the brainstem. Axons from the Edinger-Westphal nucleus and the oculomotor nucleus run together in the brainstem and exit together as the oculomotor nerve. The oculomotor nerve passes through the lateral wall of the cavernous sinus and enters the orbit through the superior orbital fissure. It divides into branches that innervate the levator palpebrae superioris and four of the six extraocular muscles. Parasympathetic fibers initially run in the inferior division of the oculomotor nerve. They exit as one or two short “motor roots” that synapse in the ciliary ganglion.

Postsynaptic parasympathetic fibers leave the ciliary ganglion in multiple (six to ten) short ciliary nerves. These nerves enter the posterior aspect of the eyeball to supply the sphincter pupillae and ciliaris muscles. The sphincter pupillae constricts the iris. The ciliaris muscle changes the shape of the lens, allowing the eye to focus on nearby objects (accommodation). Neither of these muscles is under voluntary control.
