= Posterior ethmoidal =

Posterior ethmoidal may refer to:

- Posterior ethmoidal artery, an artery of the head which supplies the nasal septum
- Posterior ethmoidal foramen
- Posterior ethmoidal nerve, a branch of the nasociliary nerve
- Ethmoidal veins, the venae comitantes of the ethmoidal arteries
