= Anterior ethmoidal =

Anterior ethmoidal may refer to:

- Anterior ethmoidal artery
- Anterior ethmoidal foramen
- Anterior ethmoidal vein
