= Anterior canal =

Anterior canal may refer to:

== Human anatomy ==
- Anterior ethmoidal foramen, near the olfactory groove
- Anterior semicircular canal, in the inner ear

== Gastropod anatomy ==
- Siphonal canal
