= Heinrich Müller (physiologist) =

German anatomist

Heinrich Müller (17 December 1820 – 10 May 1864) was a German anatomist and professor at the University of Würzburg. He is best known for his work in comparative anatomy and his studies involving the eye.

He was a native of Castell, Lower Franconia. He was a student at several universities, being influenced by Ignaz Dollinger (1770–1841) in Munich, Friedrich Arnold (1803–1890) in Freiburg, Jakob Henle (1809–1895) in Heidelberg and Carl von Rokitansky (1804–1878) in Vienna. In 1847 he received his habilitation at Würzburg, where from 1858 he served as a full professor of topographical and comparative anatomy. As an instructor, he also taught classes in systematic anatomy, histology and microscopy.

In 1851 Müller noticed the red color in rod cells now known as rhodopsin or visual purple, which is a pigment that is present in the rods of the retina. However, Franz Christian Boll (1849–1879) is credited as the discoverer of rhodopsin because he was able to describe its "visual pigment cycle". Müller also described the fibers of neuroglia cells that make up the supporting framework of the retina. This structure was to become known as "Müller's fibers".

Alongside Carl Bergmann, Müller is credited as co-discover, in 1854, of the anatomical site where vision is initiated . Müller moved various lights over his own and other observers' pupils and scleras, producing moving shadows of the retinal blood vessels from motion parallax. This allowed him to reject the notion that conversion of light into vision happens closer to the light than the retinal blood vessels, as was accepted then. By careful measurement of the movements, he located the conversion of light into vision in the rods and cones.

In 1856, with his colleague Albert von Kölliker (1817–1905), Müller showed that an electric current was produced from each contraction of a frog's heart.

== Additional eponyms ==
- "Müller's muscle": Circular portion of the ciliary muscle of the eye. Also called "Rouget's muscle" after French physiologist Charles Marie Benjamin Rouget (1824–1904), and sometimes "Müller-Rouget muscle" in honor of both men.
- "Müller's muscle": superior tarsal muscle which is a smooth muscle that adjoins the levator palpebrae superioris muscle and helps to raise the upper eyelid.
- "Müller's muscle": orbitalis muscle which is a smooth muscle that crosses from the infraorbital groove and inferior orbital fissure.
- "Müller's trigone": Part of tuber cinereum folding over the optic chiasm of the brain.
- "Müller glia": Cells in the retina which scaffold and nurture retinal neurons.

== Partial bibliography ==
- Nachweis der negativen Schwankung des Muskelstroms am naturlich sich contrahirenden Muskel. Verhandlungen der Physikalisch-medizinische Gesellschaft in Würzburg, 1856, 6: 528–533. By Rudolph Albert von Kölliker (1817–1905) and Heinrich Müller.
- Zur Histologie der Netzhaut. Zeitschrift für Wissenschaftliche Zoologie, 1851, 3: 234–237. Discovery of visual purple.

After his death, a large number of his works were published by Otto Becker (1828–1890) in a collection titled Heinrich Müller's gesammelte und hinterlassene Schriften zur Anatomie und Physiologie des Auges (Heinrich Müller's collected and bequeathed writings on the anatomy and physiology of the eye).

== External Reference ==
- "Heinrich Müller". Who Named It. Archived from the original on March 1, 2003.
