= Ethmoidal foramen =

Ethmoidal foramen may refer to:

- Anterior ethmoidal foramen
- Posterior ethmoidal foramen
