= Ophthalmic nerve =

Sensory nerve of the face

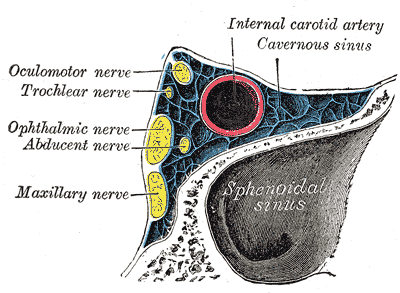
- Oblique section through the cavernous sinus.

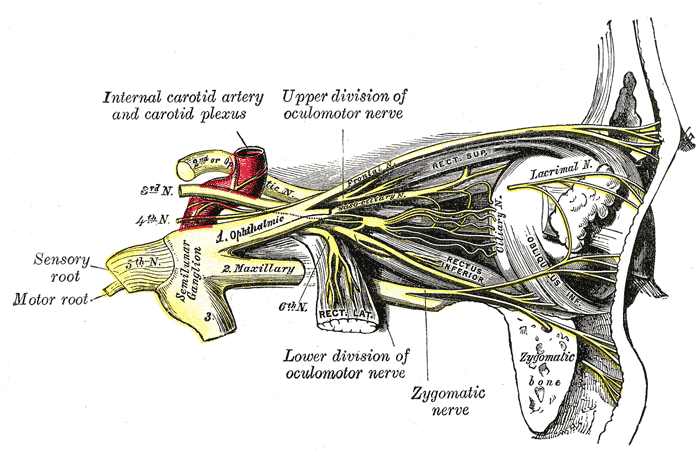
- Nerves of the orbit, and the ciliary ganglion. Side view.

Details
- From: Trigeminal nerve
- To: Frontal nerve, lacrimal nerve, nasociliary nerve

Identifiers
- Latin: nervus ophthalmicus
- MeSH: D009882
- TA98: A14.2.01.016
- TA2: 6196
- FMA: 52621

The ophthalmic nerve (CN V_{1}) is a sensory nerve of the head. It is one of three divisions of the trigeminal nerve (CN V), the fifth cranial nerve. It has three major branches which provide sensory innervation to the eye, and the skin of the upper face and anterior scalp, as well as other structures of the head.

== Structure ==
=== Origin ===
The ophthalmic nerve is the first branch of the trigeminal nerve (CN V), the first and smallest of its three divisions. It arises from the superior part of the trigeminal ganglion.

=== Course ===
It passes anterior-ward along the lateral wall of the cavernous sinus inferior to the oculomotor nerve (CN III) and trochlear nerve (CN IV). It exits the skull into the orbit through the superior orbital fissure.

=== Branches ===
Within the skull, the ophthalmic nerve produces:

- meningeal branch (tentorial nerve)

The ophthalmic nerve divides into three major branches which pass through the superior orbital fissure:

- frontal nerve
  - supraorbital nerve
  - supratrochlear nerve
- lacrimal nerve
- nasociliary nerve
  - posterior ethmoidal nerve
  - anterior ethmoidal nerve
    - external nasal nerve
  - long ciliary nerves
  - infratrochlear nerve
  - communicating branch to ciliary ganglion

=== Distribution ===
The ophthalmic nerve provides sensory innervation to the cornea, ciliary body, and iris; to the lacrimal gland and conjunctiva; to the part of the mucous membrane of the nasal cavity; and to the skin of the eyelids, eyebrow, forehead and nose.

It carries sensory branches from the eyes, conjunctiva, lacrimal gland, nasal cavity, frontal sinus, ethmoidal cells, falx cerebri, dura mater in the anterior cranial fossa, superior parts of the tentorium cerebelli, upper eyelid, dorsum of the nose, and anterior part of the scalp.

Roughly speaking, the ophthalmic nerve supplies general somatic afferents to the upper face, head, and eye:

- Face: Upper eyelid and associated conjunctiva. Eyebrow, forehead, scalp all the way to the lambdoid suture.
- Skull: Roof of orbit, frontal, ethmoid, and possibly sphenoid sinuses.
- Eye: The eye itself (all the intraocular structures such as cornea) and the lacrimal gland and sac.

In comparison, the maxillary nerve (CN V2) provides general somatic afferents to the mid-face and mid-head.

== Clinical significance ==
Damage to the ophthalmic nerve can cause loss of sensation of the structures it supplies in the face. The corneal reflex may be lost, which can increase the risk of damage to the cornea.

== Additional images ==
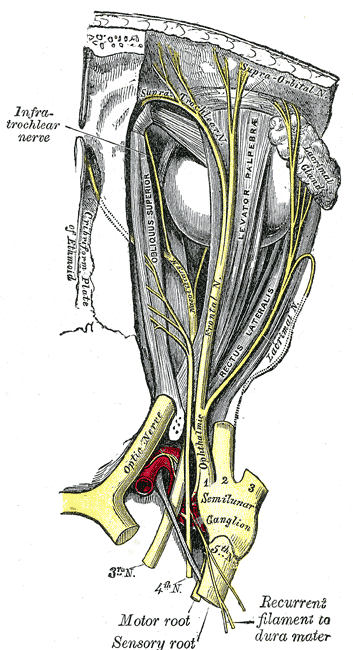
Nerves of the orbit. Seen from above.

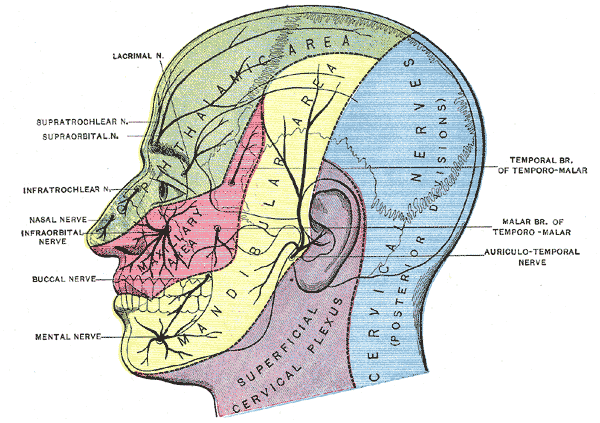
Dermatome distribution of the trigeminal nerve

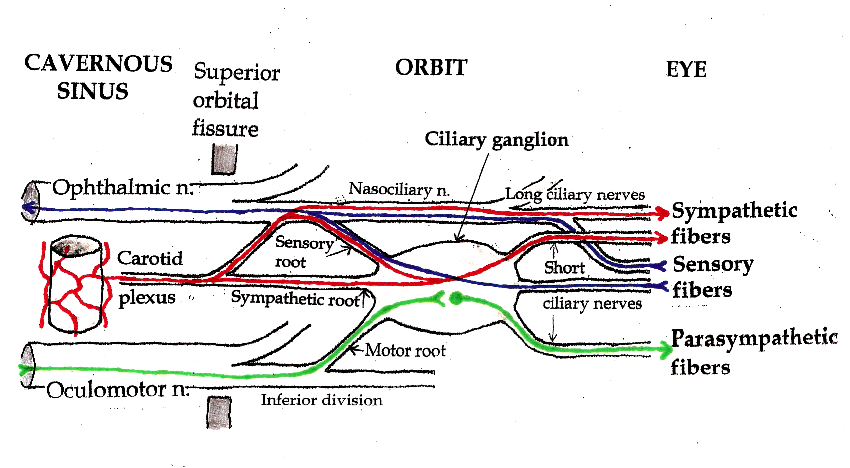
Pathways in the ciliary ganglion.

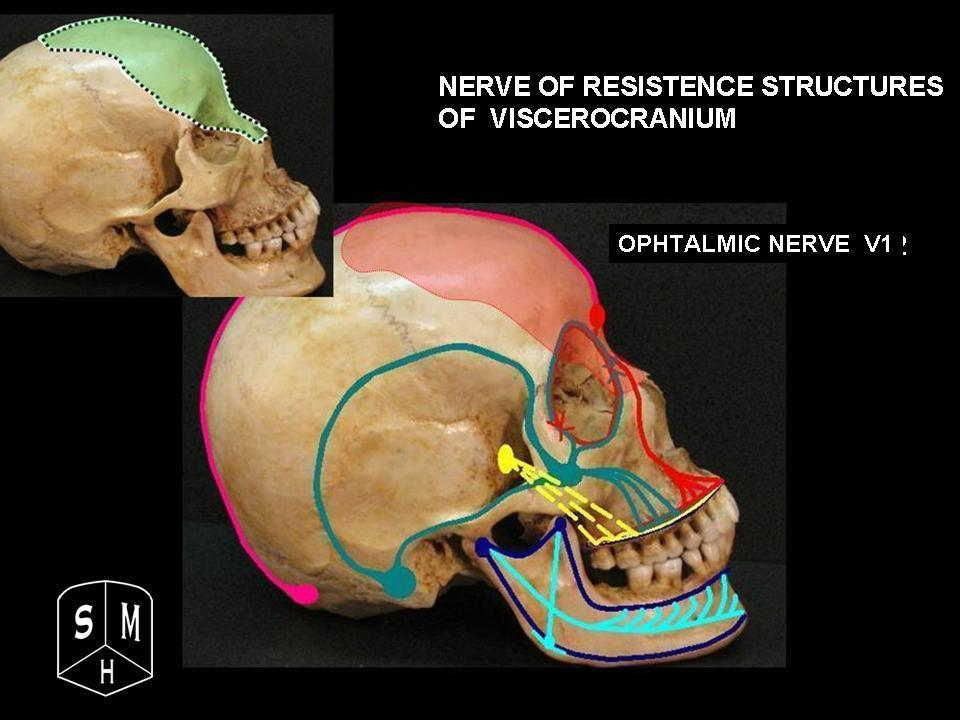
Ophthalmic nerve

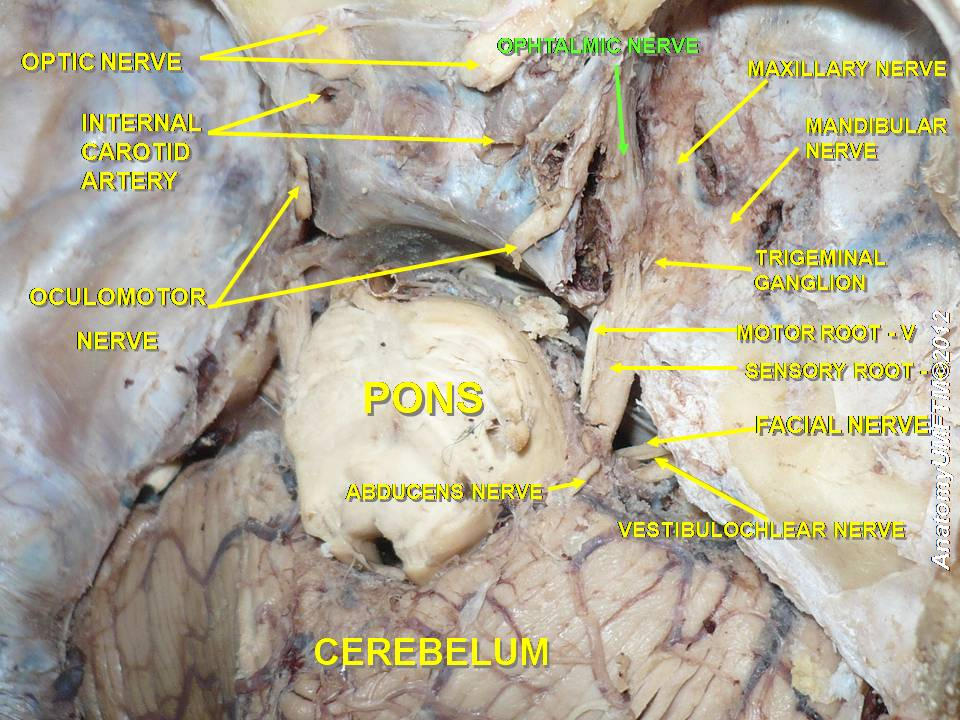
Ophthalmic nerve

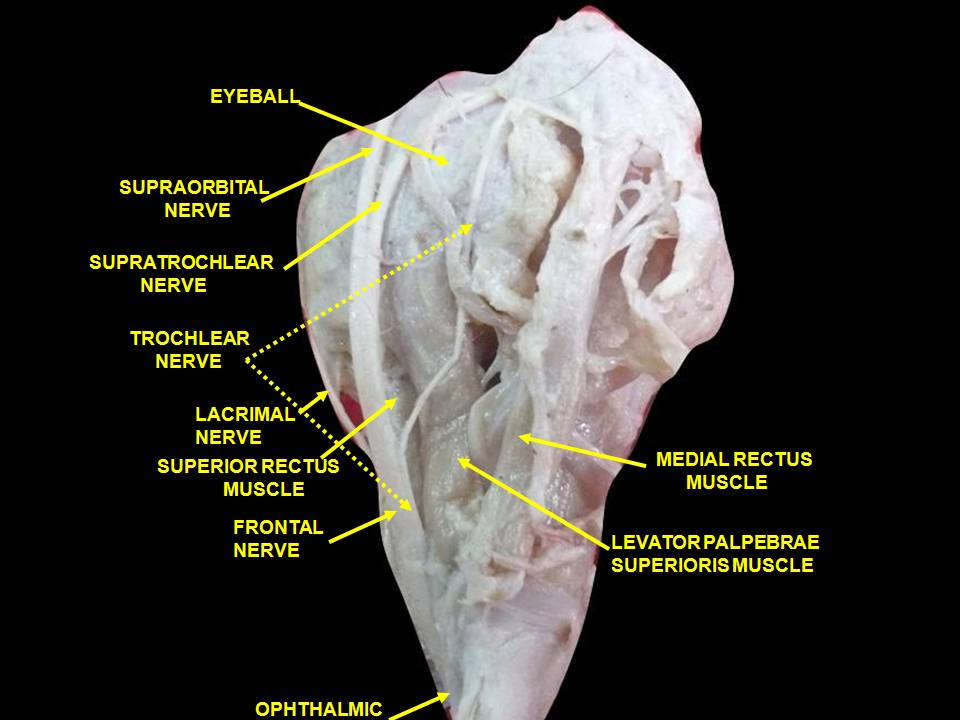
Extrinsic eye muscle. Nerves of orbita. Deep dissection.

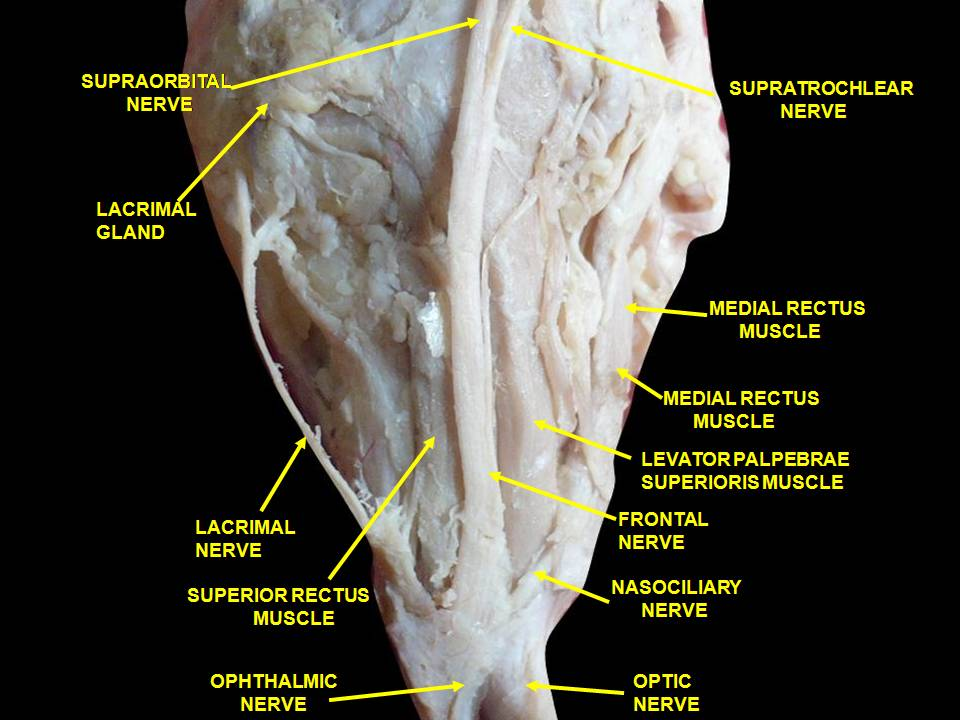
Extrinsic eye muscle. Nerves of orbita. Deep dissection.

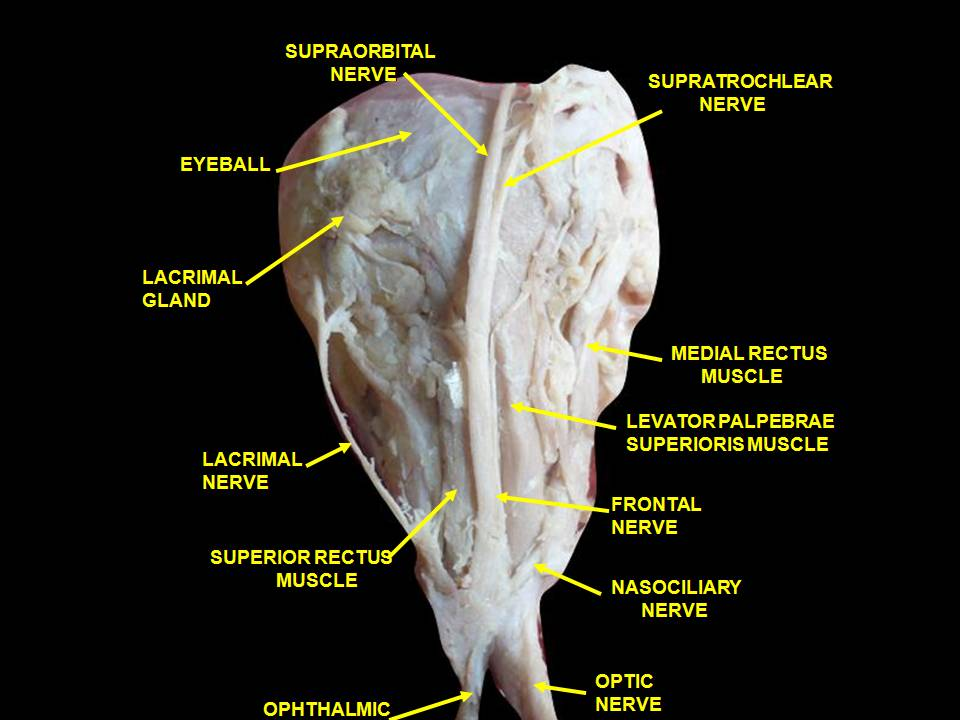
Extrinsic eye muscle. Nerves of orbita. Deep dissection.

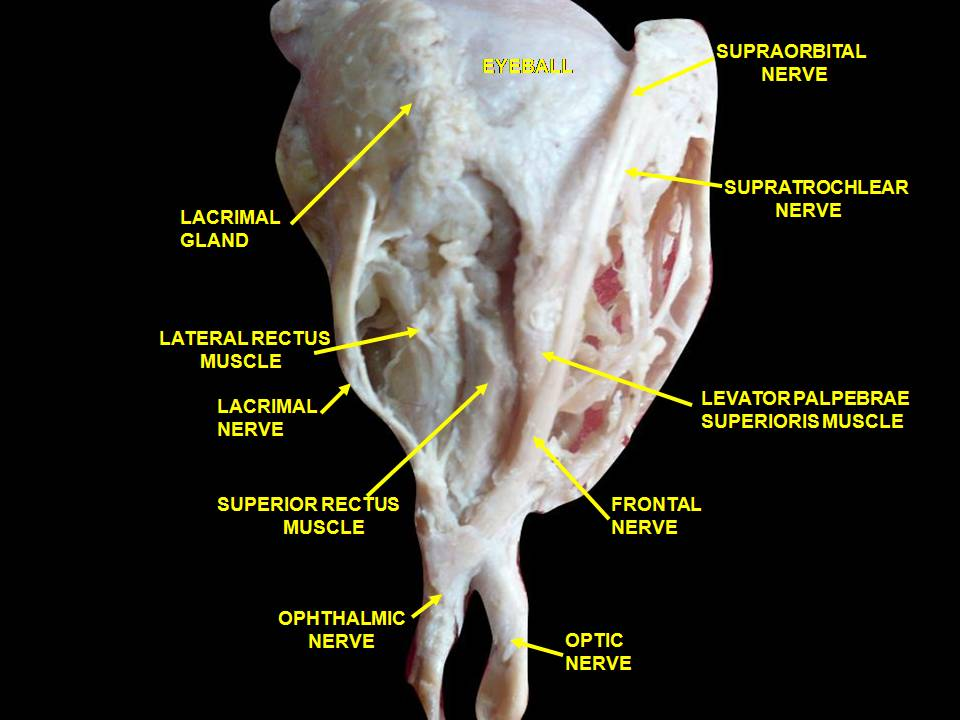
Extrinsic eye muscle. Nerves of orbita. Deep dissection.

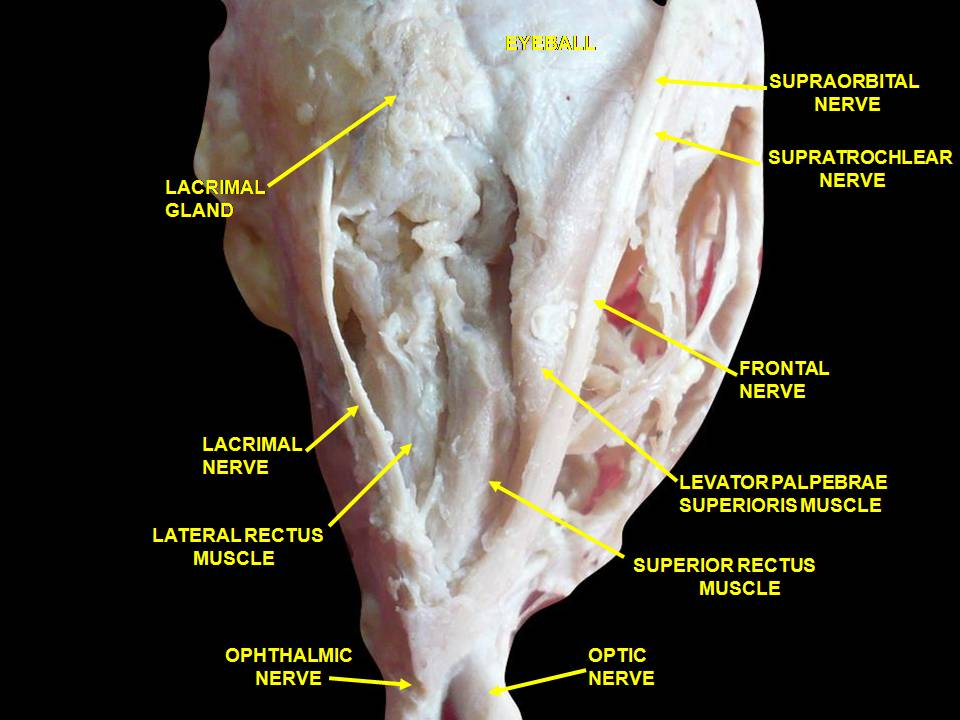
Extrinsic eye muscle. Nerves of orbita. Deep dissection.

== See also ==
- Optic nerve (CN II)
- Optic tract
