= Infratrochlear nerve =

Branch of the nasociliary nerve

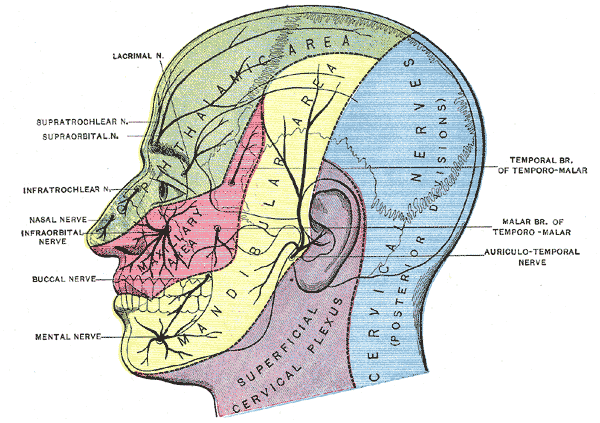
- Sensory innervation of the head. The infratrochlear nerve is seen in the green area, emerging from the orbit.

Details
- From: Nasociliary nerve
- Innervates: Skin of eyelids, conjunctiva, lacrimal sac, lacrimal caruncle, side of nose above medial canthus

Identifiers
- Latin: nervus infratrochlearis
- TA98: A14.2.01.035
- TA2: 6214
- FMA: 52693

The infratrochlear nerve is a sensory branch of the nasociliary nerve (itself a branch of the ophthalmic nerve (CN V_{1})) in the orbit. It courses along the medial wall of the orbit and exits near the medial angle of the eye beneath to the trochlea of superior oblique. It provides sensory innervation to structures at the medial orbit including the skin of the medial eyelids, root of the nose, and parts of the lacrimal sac. This nerve is relevant in procedures involving the medial eyelid, lacrimal apparatus, and nasal root.

== Structure ==
The nasociliary nerve terminates by bifurcating into the infratrochlear and the anterior ethmoidal nerves. The infratrochlear nerve travels anteriorly in the orbit along the upper border of the medial rectus muscle and underneath the trochlea of the superior oblique muscle. It exits the orbit medially and divides into small sensory branches.

=== Distribution ===
The infratrochlear nerve provides sensory innervation to the skin of the eyelids, the conjunctiva, lacrimal sac, lacrimal caruncle, and the side of the nose superior to the medial canthus.

=== Communications ===
The infratrochlear nerve receives a descending communicating branch from the supratrochlear nerve.

== Etymology ==
The infratrochlear nerve is named after a structure it passes under. Infratrochlear means "below the trochlea". The term trochlea means "pulley" in Latin. Specifically, the trochlea refers to a fibrocartilaginous loop at the superomedial surface of the orbit called the trochlea, through which the tendon of the superior oblique muscle passes.

== Additional images ==
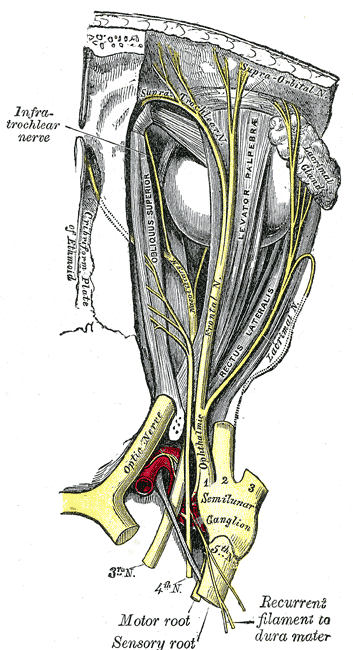
Nerves of the orbit. Seen from above. The infratrochlear nerve is labelled at the top left, and can be seen as a terminal branch of the nasociliary nerve, along with the anterior ethmoidal nerve.
