= Supratrochlear nerve =

Nerve of the forehead

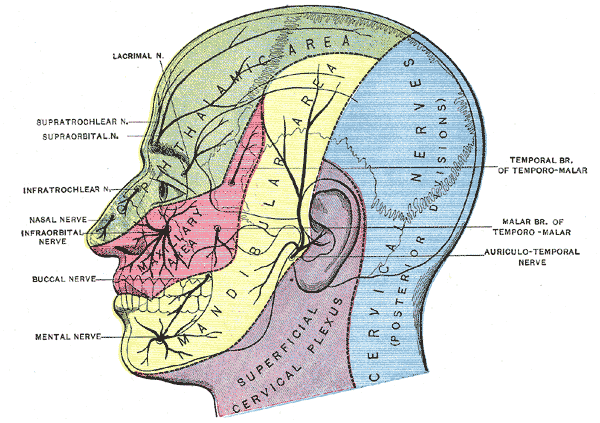
- Sensory areas of the head, showing the general distribution of the three divisions of the fifth nerve. (Supratrochlear nerve labeled at upper left.)

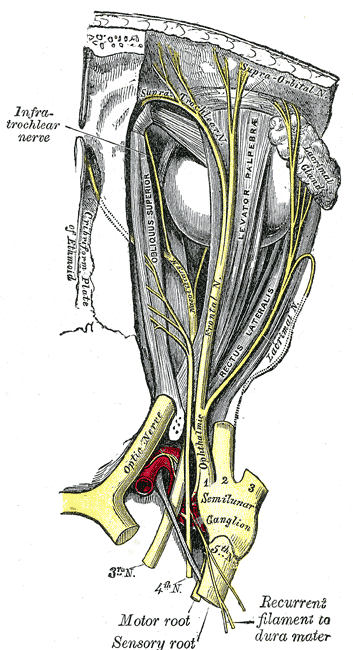
- Nerves of the orbit. Seen from above. (Supratrochlear nerve visible near top.)

Details
- From: Frontal nerve

Identifiers
- Latin: nervus supratrochlearis
- TA98: A14.2.01.024
- TA2: 6203
- FMA: 52642

The supratrochlear nerve is a branch of the frontal nerve, itself a branch of the ophthalmic nerve (CN V_{1}) from the trigeminal nerve (CN V). It provides sensory innervation to the skin of the forehead and the upper eyelid.

== Structure ==
=== Origin ===
The supratrochlear nerve is the smaller of the two terminal branches of the frontal nerve (the other being the supraorbital nerve). It arises midway between the base and apex of the orbit where the frontal nerve splits into said terminal branches.

=== Course ===
The supratrochlear nerve passes medially above the trochlea of the superior oblique muscle. It then travels anteriorly above the levator palpebrae superioris muscle. It exits the orbit through the supratrochlear notch or foramen. It then ascends onto the forehead beneath the corrugator supercilii muscle and frontalis muscle. It finally divides into sensory branches.

The supratrochlear nerve travels with the supratrochlear artery, a branch of the ophthalmic artery.

=== Branches ===
Before exiting the orbit, the supratrochlear nerve emits a descending branch to the infratrochlear nerve.

== Function ==
The supratrochlear nerve provides sensory innervation to the skin and conjunctiva of the upper eyelid, and the skin of the inferomedial forehead. It may also provide sensory innervation to part of the periosteum of the frontal bone.

== Clinical significance ==
The supratrochlear nerve may be anaesthetised for surgery of parts of the scalp. This can be used for small lesions of the scalp. It can also be used for more extensive injury to the scalp. It is often anaesthetised alongside the supraorbital artery.

== Etymology ==
The supratrochlear nerve is named for its passage above the trochlea of the superior oblique muscle.

== Additional images ==
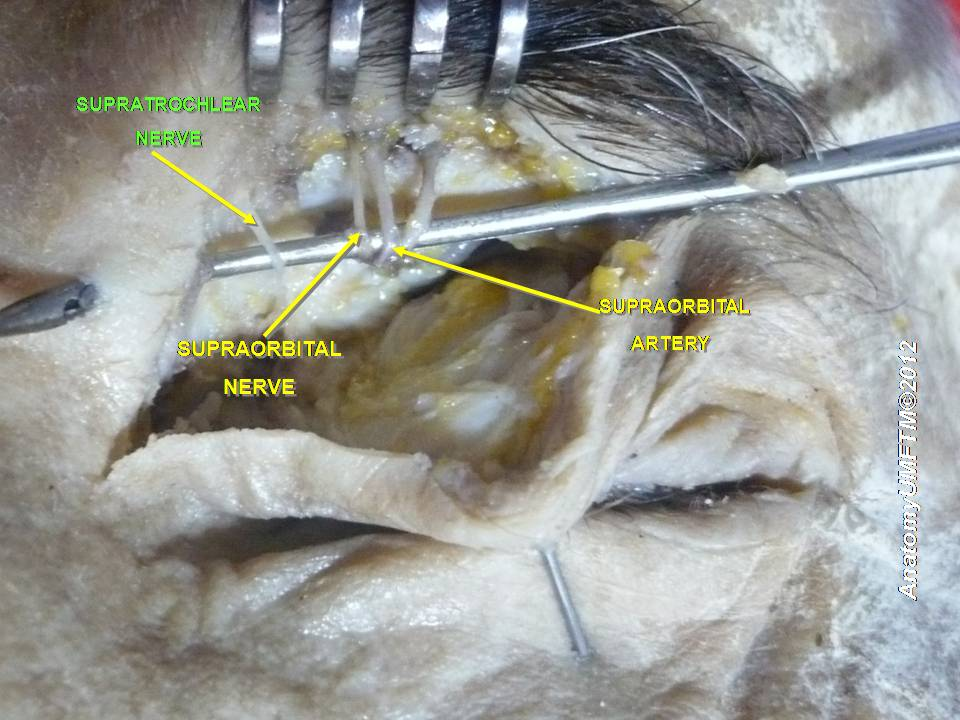
Supratrochlear nerve

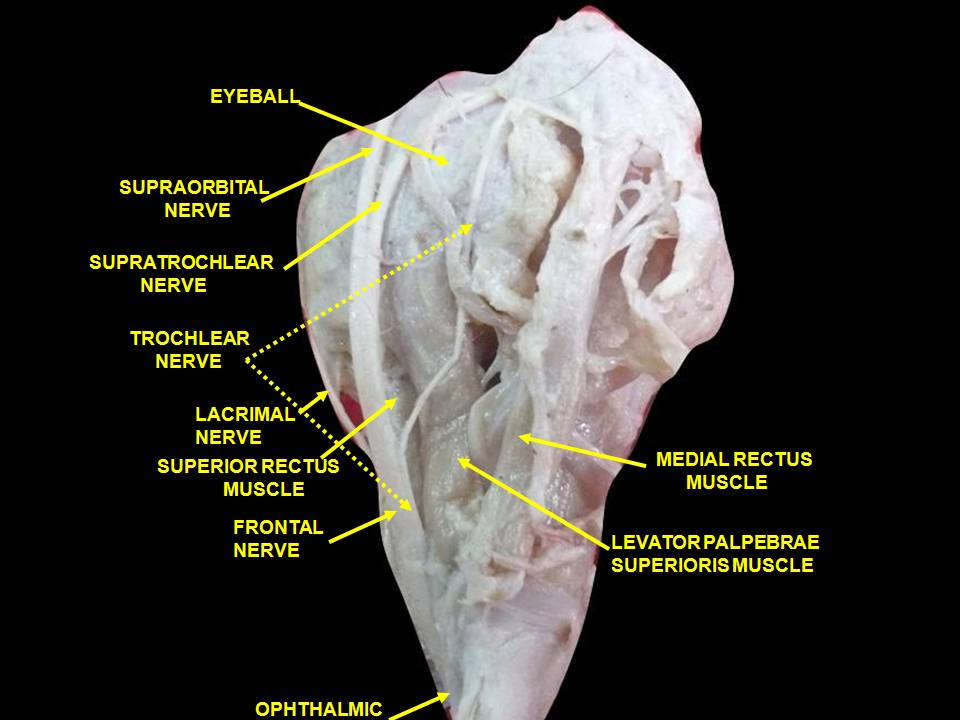
Extrinsic eye muscle. Nerves of orbita. Deep dissection.

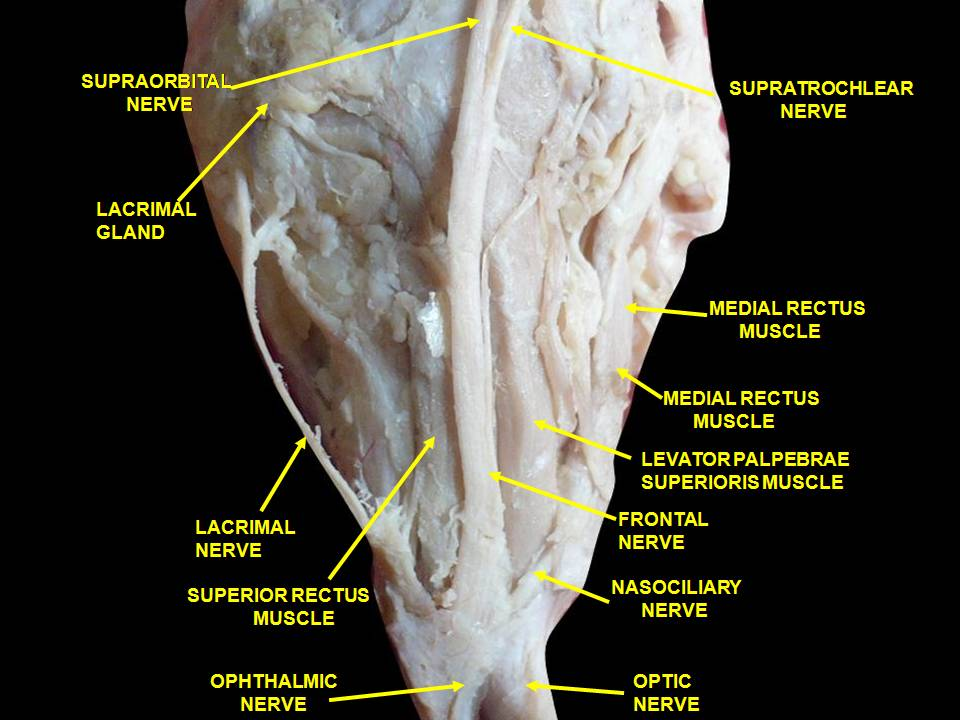
Extrinsic eye muscle. Nerves of orbita. Deep dissection.

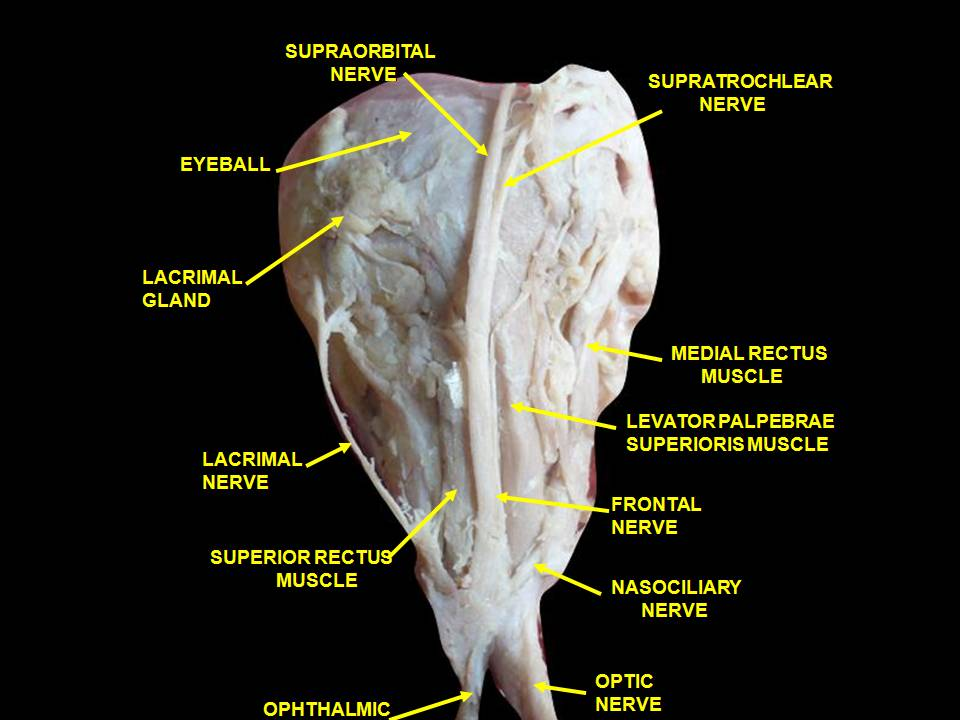
Extrinsic eye muscle. Nerves of orbita. Deep dissection.

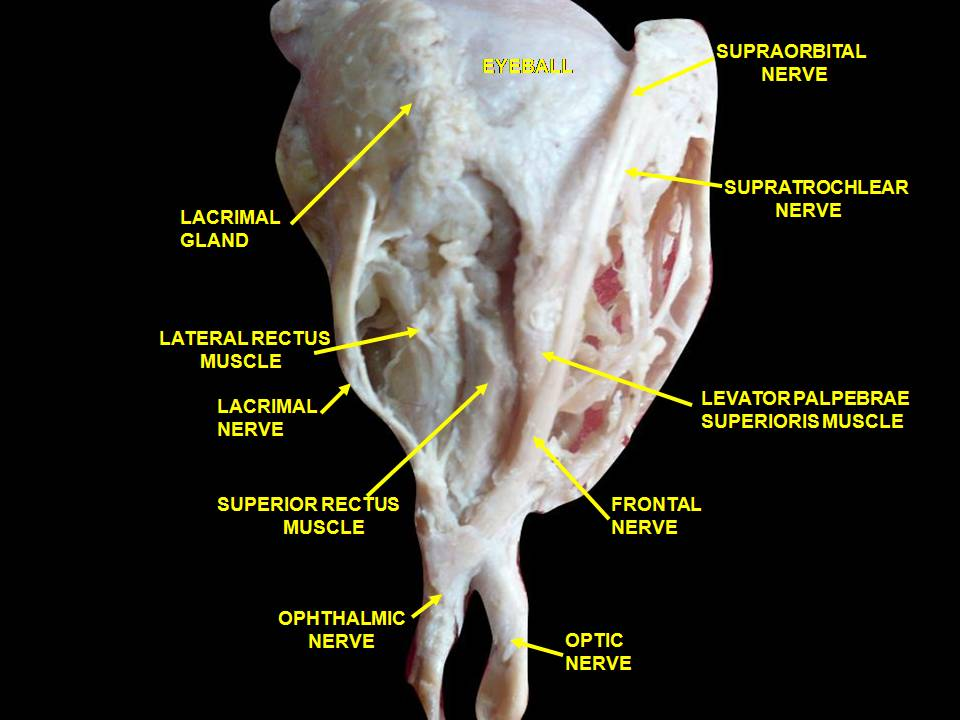
Extrinsic eye muscle. Nerves of orbita. Deep dissection.

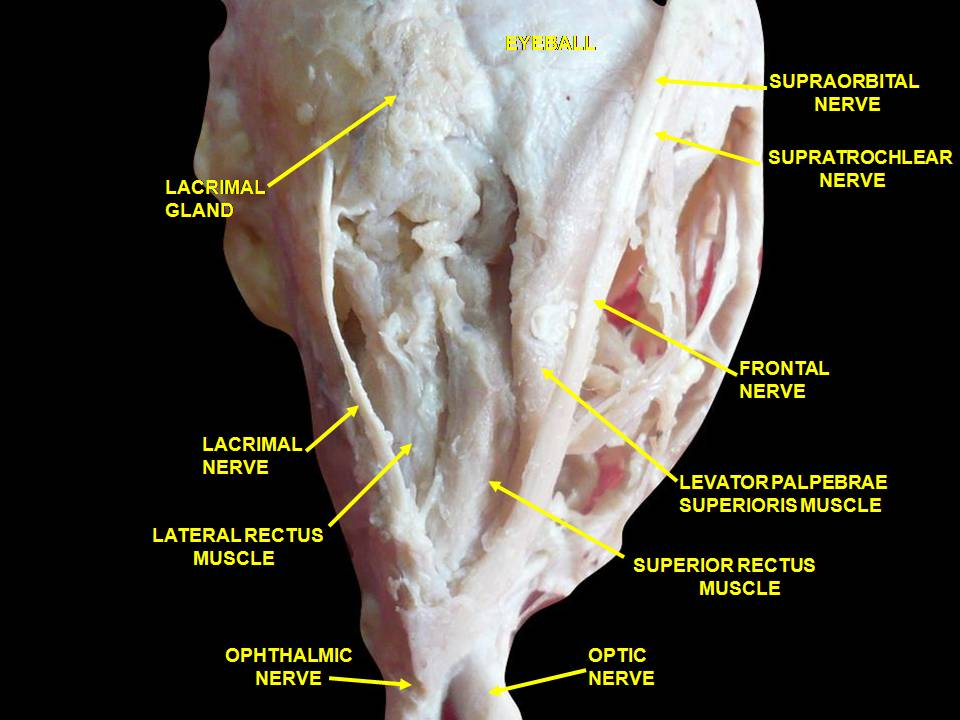
Extrinsic eye muscle. Nerves of orbita. Deep dissection.
