= Frontal nerve =

Nerve supplying the forehead, frontal sinus, and upper eyelid

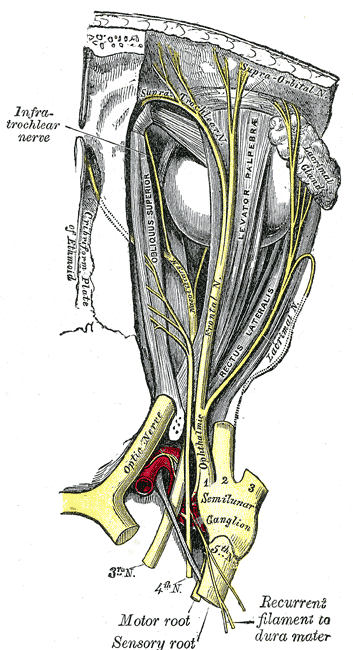
- Nerves of the orbit. Seen from above.

Details
- From: Ophthalmic nerve
- To: Supratrochlear nerve and supraorbital nerve
- Innervates: Skin of forehead, mucosa of frontal sinus, skin of upper eyelid

Identifiers
- Latin: nervus frontalis
- TA98: A14.2.01.020
- TA2: 6199
- FMA: 52638

The frontal nerve is the largest branch of the ophthalmic nerve (V_{1}), itself a branch of the trigeminal nerve (CN V). It supplies sensation to the skin of the forehead, the mucosa of the frontal sinus, and the skin of the upper eyelid. It may be affected by schwannoma.

== Structure ==
The frontal nerve is a branch of the ophthalmic nerve (V_{1}), itself a branch of the trigeminal nerve (CN V). The frontal nerve branches immediately before entering the superior orbital fissure. In then travels superolateral to the annulus of Zinn between the lacrimal nerve and inferior ophthalmic vein. After entering the orbit it travels anteriorly between the roof periosteum and the levator palpebrae superioris. Midway between the apex and base of the orbit it divides into two branches, the supratrochlear nerve and supraorbital nerve.

== Functions ==
The two branches of the frontal nerve provide sensory innervation to the skin of the forehead, mucosa of the frontal sinus (an air sinus), and the skin of the upper eyelid.

== Clinical significance ==
The frontal nerve may rarely be affected by schwannoma, a benign nerve tumor affecting its myelin sheath. This may be between the superior orbital fissure and the supraorbital foramen or supraorbital notch. It may cause damage to the adjacent orbital part of the frontal bone. A CT scan or magnetic resonance imaging may be used to identify the extent of the cancer. A biopsy may be taken to confirm a diagnosis. Surgery may be used to remove the schwannoma.

== Additional images ==
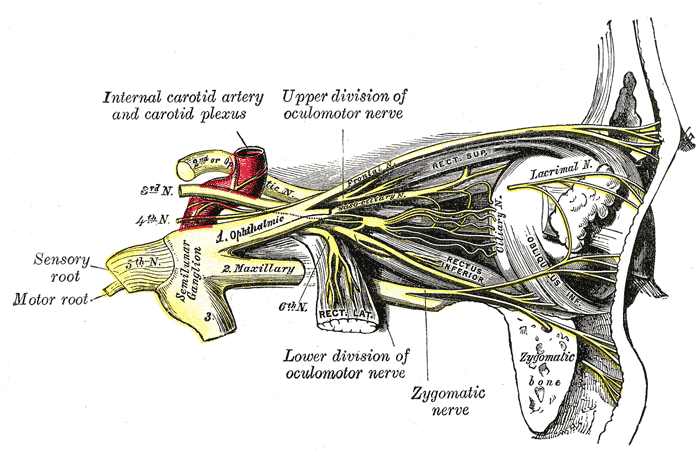
Nerves of the orbit. The frontal nerve is visible branching from the ophthalmic nerve.

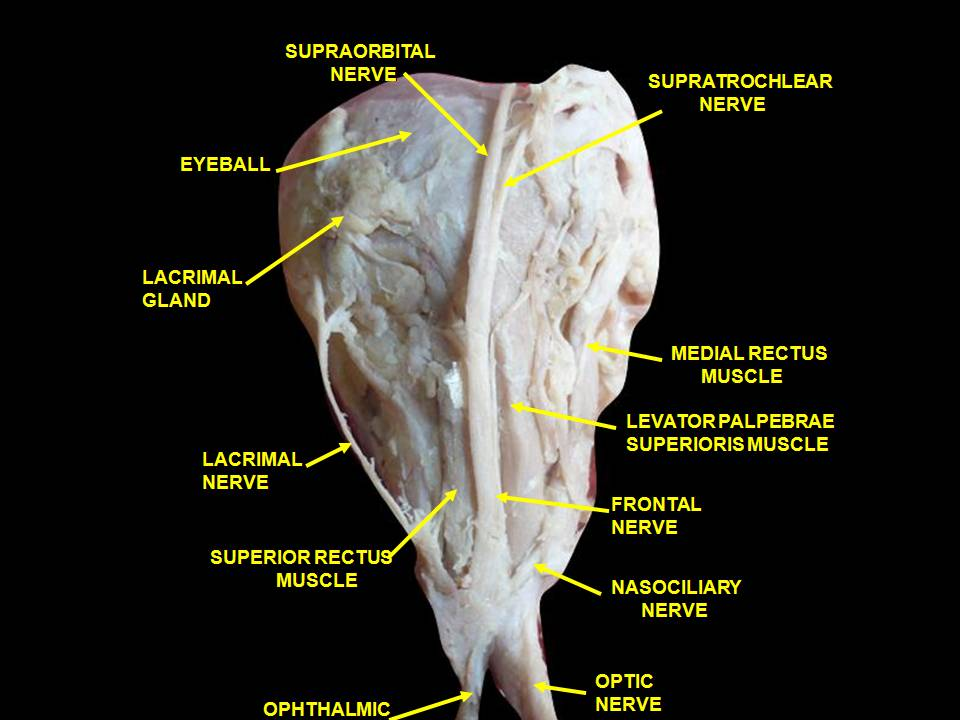
Superior view of a dissection of the orbit. The frontal nerve is visible branching into the supratrochlear and supraorbital nerves.

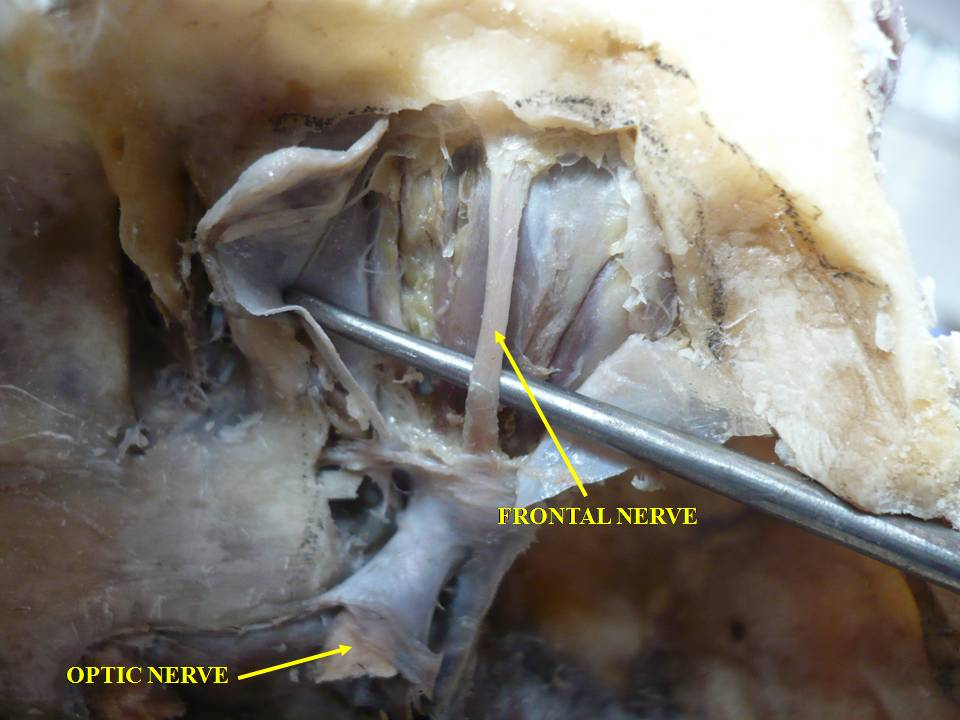
Superior view of a dissection of the orbit. An instrument is inserted between the frontal nerve and the levator palpebrae superioris.
