= Supraorbital nerve =

Branch of the frontal nerve

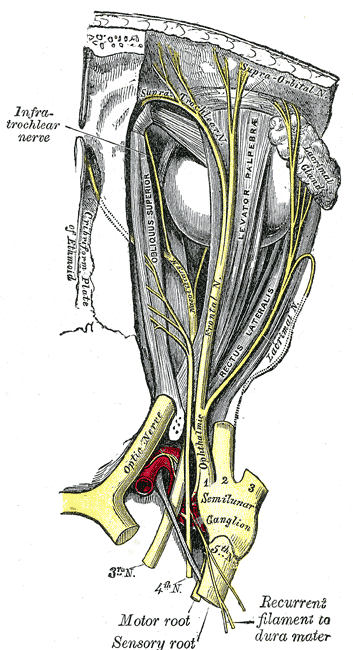
- Nerves of the orbit seen from above (supraorbital nerve labeled at upper right)

Details
- From: Frontal nerve
- Innervates: Skin of forehead, upper eyelid and scalp till cranial vertex, conjunctiva of upper eyelid, frontal sinus

Identifiers
- Latin: nervus supraorbitalis
- TA98: A14.2.01.021
- TA2: 6200
- FMA: 52655

The supraorbital nerve is one of two terminal branches - the other being the supratrochlear nerve - of the frontal nerve (itself a branch of the ophthalmic nerve (CN V_{1})). It exits the orbit via the supraorbital foramen/notch before splitting into a medial branch and a lateral branch. It innervates the skin of the forehead, upper eyelid, and the root of the nose.

== Structure ==
=== Origin ===
The supraorbital nerve branches from the frontal nerve midway between the base and apex of the orbit.

=== Course ===
It travels anteriorly superior to the levator palpebrae superioris muscle. It exits the orbit through the supraorbital foramen/notch in the superior margin orbit, exiting it lateral to the supratrochlear nerve. It then ascends onto the forehead deep to the corrugator supercilii muscle and frontalis muscles.

=== Fate ===
It divides into a medial branch and lateral branch - usually after emerging from the orbit, but sometimes already within the orbit.

=== Distribution ===
The supraorbital nerve provides sensory innervation to the skin of the lateral forehead and upper eyelid, as well as the conjunctiva of the upper eyelid and mucosa of the frontal sinus.

== Additional images ==
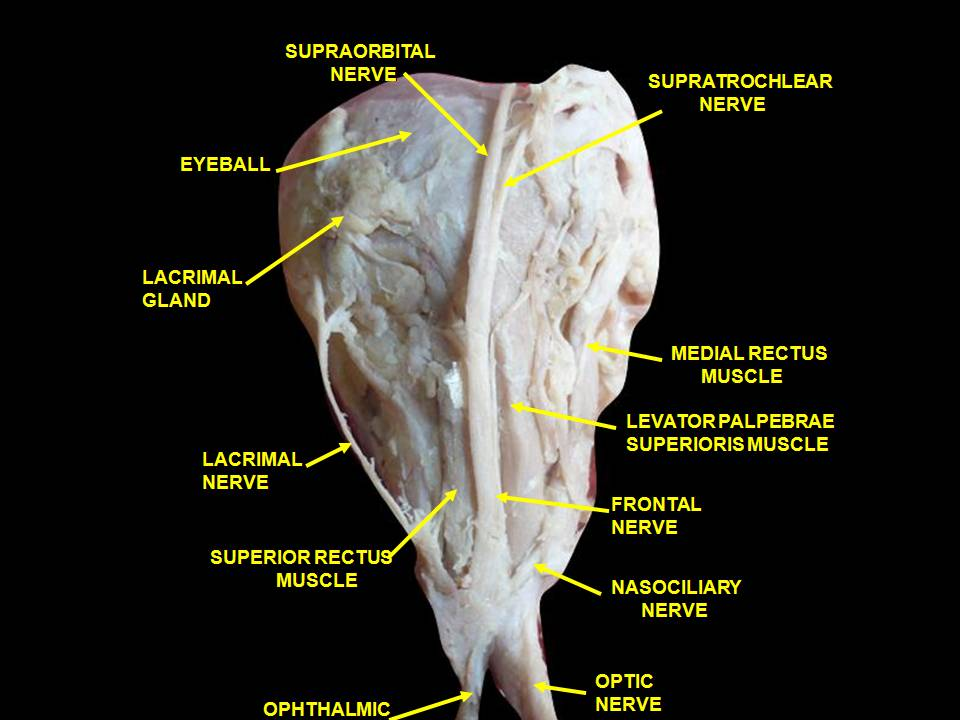
Superior view of a dissection of the left orbit. The frontal nerve can be seen dividing into the supratrochlear nerve, medially and the supraorbital nerve, laterally.

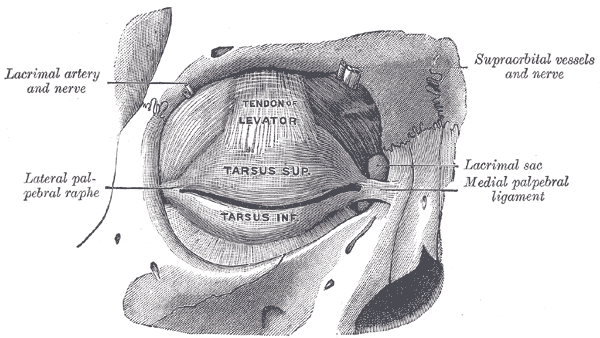
Anterior view of the orbit. The supraorbital nerve can be seen exiting the orbit through the supraorbital notch with the supraorbital artery.
