= Frontoethmoidal suture =

Suture between the ethmoid bone and the frontal bone

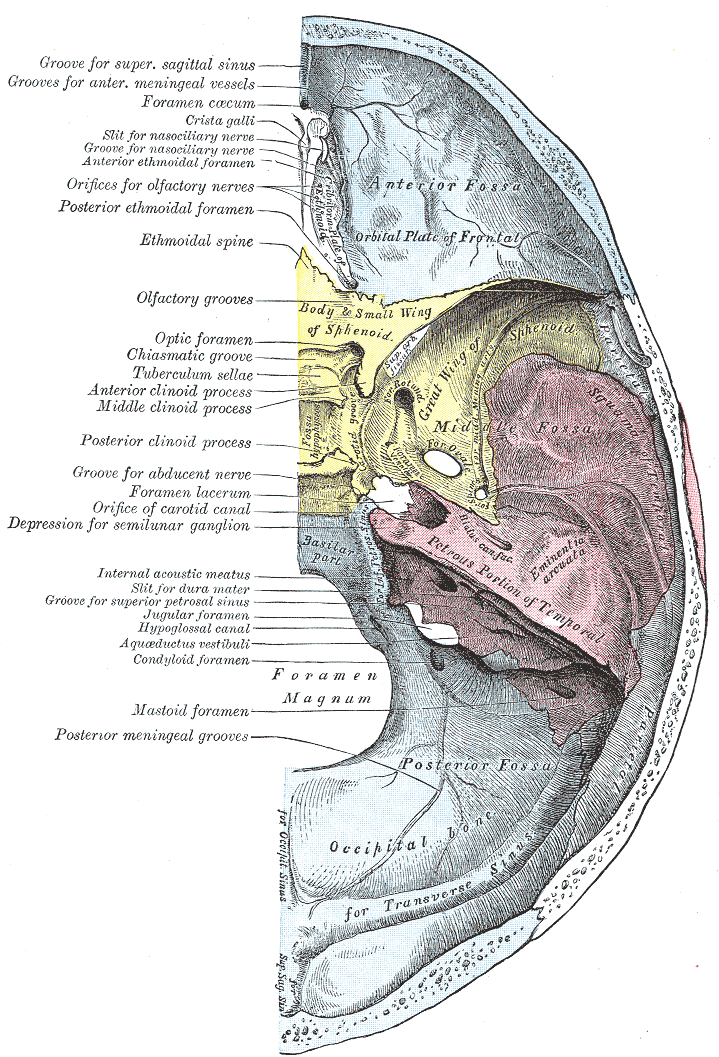
- Base of the skull. Upper surface. (Frontoethmoidal suture is not labeled, but is visible at top, between frontal bone in blue, and ethmoid bone in white.)

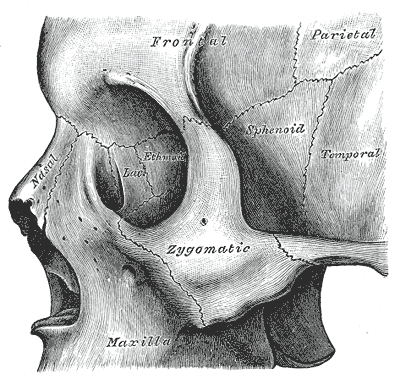
- Left zygomatic bone in situ.

Details

Identifiers
- Latin: sutura frontoethmoidalis
- TA98: A03.1.02.014
- TA2: 1589
- FMA: 52949

The frontoethmoidal suture is the suture between the ethmoid bone and the frontal bone.

It is located in the anterior cranial fossa.
