= Posterior ethmoidal nerve =

Nerve of the orbit around the eye

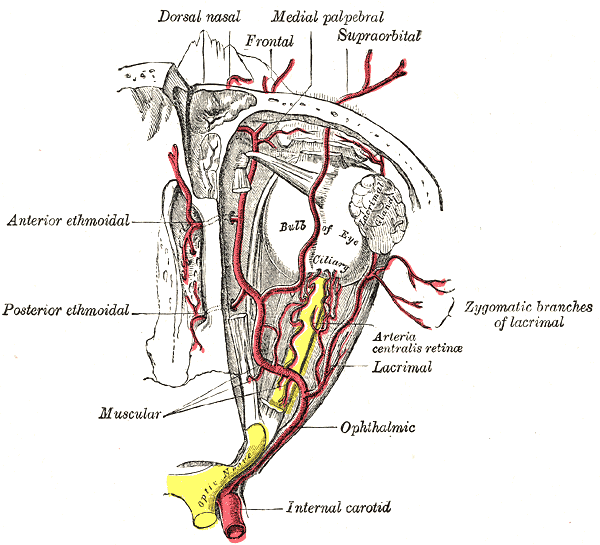
- The ophthalmic artery and its branches. (Nerve not pictured, but location is similar to artery.)

Details
- From: Nasociliary nerve
- Innervates: Sphenoidal sinus, ethmoidal sinus

Identifiers
- Latin: nervus ethmoidalis posterior
- TA98: A14.2.01.028
- TA2: 6207
- FMA: 52714

The posterior ethmoidal nerve is a nerve of the head. It is a branch of the nasociliary nerve (itself a branch of the ophthalmic nerve (CN V_{1})). It provides sensory innervation to the sphenoid sinus and ethmoid sinus, and part of the dura mater in the anterior cranial fossa.

== Structure ==
=== Origin ===
The posterior ethmoidal nerve is a branch of the nasociliary nerve.

=== Course ===
It passes through the posterior ethmoidal foramen alongside the posterior ethmoidal artery.

=== Branches ===
Within the anterior cranial fossa, it issues a branch to which innervates part of the dura mater.

It gives branches to the sphenoid sinus and the ethmoid sinus.

=== Variation ===
The posterior ethmoidal nerve is absent in a significant proportion of people. This may be around 30%.

== Function ==
The posterior ethmoidal nerve supplies sensation to the sphenoid sinus and the ethmoid sinus. It also supplies sensation to part of the dura mater in the anterior cranial fossa.

== Other animals ==
The posterior ethmoidal nerve is present in other animals, including horses. Headshaking can sometimes be treated with analgesia or neurectomy of the posterior ethmoidal nerve.
