= Posterior ethmoidal artery =

Cranial artery

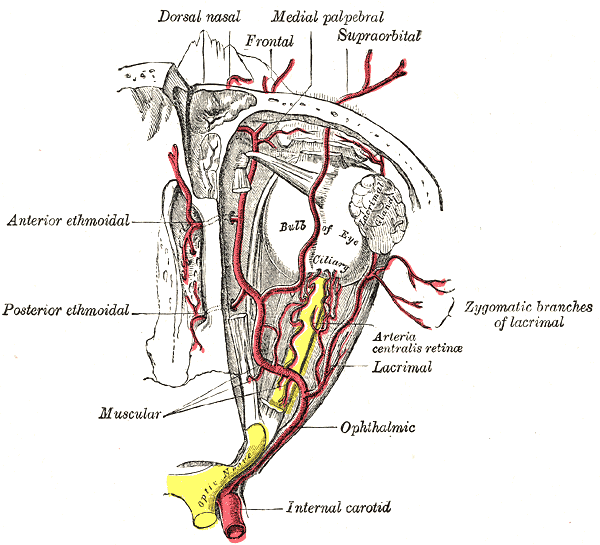
- The ophthalmic artery and its branches. (Anterior and posterior ethmoid labeled at left.)

Details
- Source: Ophthalmic artery
- Branches: Meningeal branch Nasal branches
- Vein: Ethmoidal veins
- Supplies: Posterior ethmoidal cells Posterior ethmoidal air sinuses Dura mater of the anterior cranial fossa Upper part of the nasal mucosa

Identifiers
- Latin: arteria ethmoidalis posterior
- TA98: A12.2.06.043
- TA2: 4492
- FMA: 49989

The posterior ethmoidal artery is an artery of the head which arises from the ophthalmic artery to supply the posterior ethmoidal air cells, and the meninges. It is smaller than the anterior ethmoidal artery.

== Anatomy ==
=== Origin ===
The posterior ethmoidal artery is an orbital branch of the ophthalmic artery.

=== Course and relations ===
After branching from the ophthalmic artery, the posterior ethmoidal artery passes between the upper border of the medial rectus muscle and superior oblique muscle to reach, enter and traverse the posterior ethmoidal canal.

=== Branches ===
Meningeal branch

It emits a meningeal branch to the dura mater after entering the cranium.

Nasal branches

It emits nasal branches that pass through the cribriform plate to reach the nasal cavity. The nasal branches form anastomoses with the sphenopalatine artery.

=== Distribution ===
This artery supplies the posterior ethmoidal air sinuses, the dura mater of the anterior cranial fossa, and the upper part of the nasal mucosa of the nasal septum.
