= Sphenoethmoidal suture =

Cranial suture between the sphenoid bone and the ethmoid bone

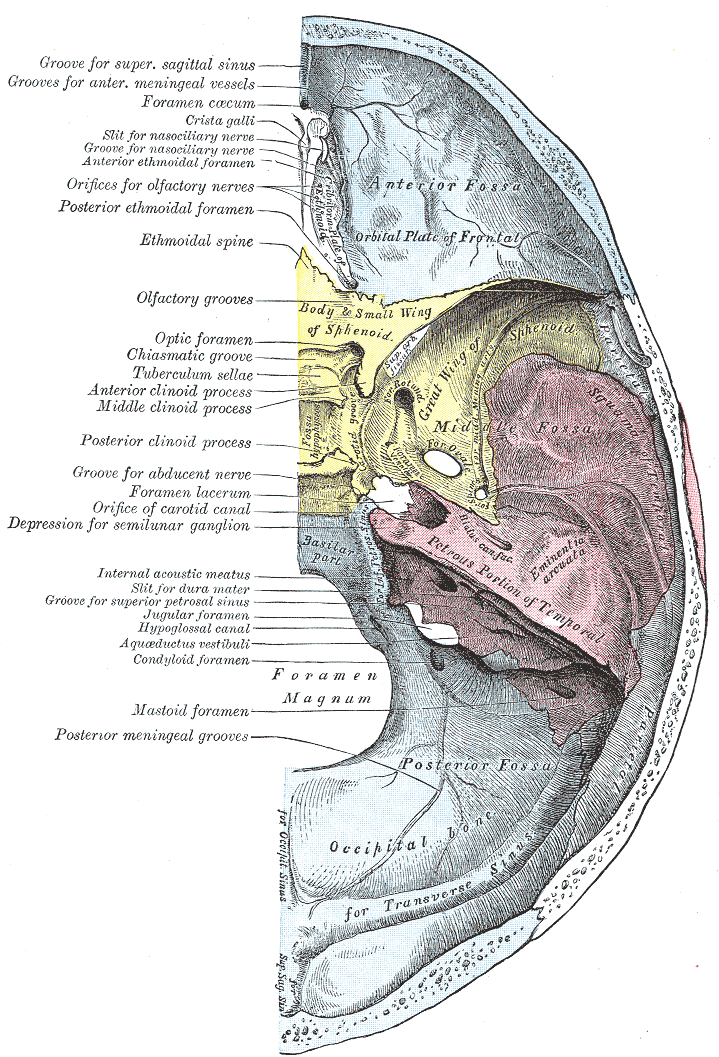
- Base of the skull. Upper surface. (Sphenoethmoidal suture is not labeled, but is visible near top between sphenoid bone in yellow, and ethmoid bone in white.)

Details

Identifiers
- Latin: sutura sphenoethmoidalis
- TA98: A03.1.02.007
- TA2: 1581
- FMA: 52943

The sphenoethmoidal suture is the cranial suture between the sphenoid bone and the ethmoid bone.

It is located in the anterior cranial fossa.
