= Ethmoidal veins =

Details
- Drains to: Superior ophthalmic vein
- Artery: Anterior ethmoidal artery, posterior ethmoidal artery

Identifiers
- Latin: venae ethmoidales
- TA98: A12.3.06.104
- TA2: 4889, 4890
- FMA: 70881

The ethmoidal veins are the venae comitantes (accompanying veins) of the anterior and posterior ethmoidal arteries, responsible for the venous drainage of blood from the roof, upper lateral, and medial walls of the nasal cavity, the dorsum of the nose, and from the dura mater of the anterior cranial fossa.
