= Anterior ethmoidal artery =

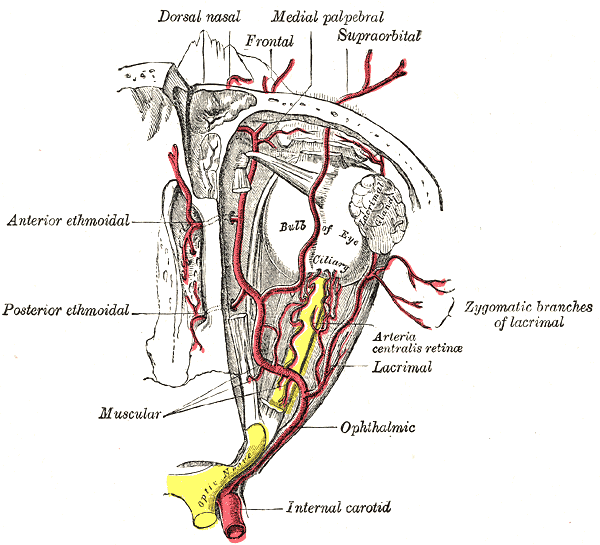
- The ophthalmic artery and its branches (anterior and posterior ethmoid labeled at left)

Details
- Source: Ophthalmic artery
- Branches: Branches to ethmoid air cells and frontal sinus, meningeal branch, nasal branches
- Vein: Ethmoidal veins
- Supplies: Anterior and middle ethmoidal cells, frontal sinus

Identifiers
- Latin: arteria ethmoidalis anterior
- TA98: A12.2.06.039
- TA2: 4487
- FMA: 49986

The anterior ethmoidal artery is a branch of the ophthalmic artery in the orbit. It exits the orbit through the anterior ethmoidal foramen alongside the anterior ethmoidal nerve. It contributes blood supply to the ethmoid sinuses, frontal sinuses, the dura mater, lateral nasal wall, and nasal septum. It issues a meningeal branch, and nasal branches.

== Structure ==
=== Origin ===
The anterior ethmoidal artery branches from the ophthalmic artery distal to the posterior ethmoidal artery.

=== Course and relations ===
It travels with the anterior ethmoidal nerve to exit the medial wall of the orbit at the anterior ethmoidal foramen. It then travels through the anterior ethmoidal canal and gives branches which supply the frontal sinus and anterior and middle ethmoid air cells. Following which, it enters the anterior cranial fossa where it bifurcates into a meningeal branch and nasal branch.

The nasal branch travels through cribriform plate to enter the nasal cavity and runs in a groove on the deep surface of the nasal bone. Here it bifurcates into a medial and lateral branch. The lateral branch supplies blood to the lateral wall of the nasal cavity and the medial branch to the nasal septum. A terminal branch of the lateral branch, called the external nasal branch passes between the nasal bone and the nasal cartilage to supply the skin of the nose.

=== Branches ===
- branches to ethmoid air cells and frontal sinus
- meningeal branch (supplies some dura mater of anterior cranial fossa, has been called the anterior falx/falcine artery)
- nasal branches (travel through cribriform foramina to enter the nasal cavity)
  - lateral nasal branch (supplies lateral wall of nasal cavity)
    - external nasal branch (supplies skin of nose)
  - medial nasal branch (supplies nasal septum)

== See also ==
- Kiesselbach's plexus
