= Superior tarsal muscle =

Muscle of the eyelid

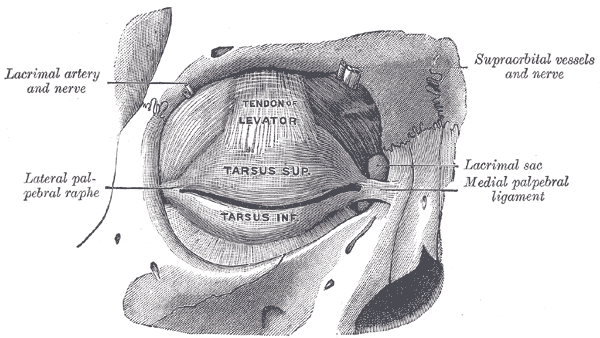
- The tarsi and their ligaments. Right eye; front view (muscle not labeled but region is visible).

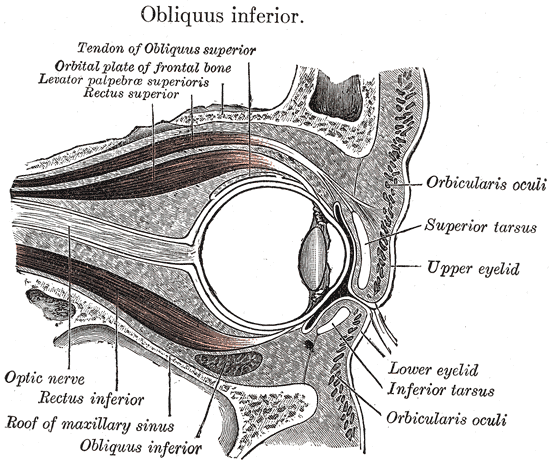
- Sagittal section of right orbital cavity (muscle not labeled but region is visible).

Details
- Origin: Underside of levator palpebrae superioris
- Insertion: Superior tarsal plate of the eyelid
- Artery: Ophthalmic artery
- Nerve: Sympathetic nervous system
- Actions: Raises the upper eyelid

Identifiers
- Latin: musculus tarsalis superior
- TA98: A15.2.07.045
- TA2: 6828
- FMA: 49058

The superior tarsal muscle is a smooth muscle adjoining the levator palpebrae superioris muscle that helps to raise the upper eyelid.

== Structure ==
The superior tarsal muscle originates on the underside of levator palpebrae superioris muscle and inserts on the superior tarsal plate of the eyelid.

=== Nerve supply ===
The superior tarsal muscle receives its innervation from the sympathetic nervous system. Postganglionic sympathetic fibers originate in the superior cervical ganglion, and travel via the internal carotid plexus, where small branches communicate with the oculomotor nerve as it passes through the cavernous sinus. The sympathetic fibres continue to the superior division of the oculomotor nerve, where they enter the superior tarsal muscle on its inferior aspect.

== Function ==
Its role is not fully clear, but may be an accessory muscle to raise the upper eyelid.

== Clinical significance ==
Damage to some elements of the sympathetic nervous system can inhibit this muscle, causing a drooping eyelid (partial ptosis). This is seen in Horner's syndrome. The ptosis seen in Horner's syndrome is of a lesser degree than is seen with an oculomotor nerve palsy.

== History ==
The muscle derives its name from Greek ταρσός 'flat surface', typically used for drying.

The term Müller's muscle is sometimes used as a synonym. However, the same term is also used for the circular fibres of the ciliary muscle, and also for the orbitalis muscle that covers the inferior orbital fissure. Given the possible confusion, the use of the term Müller's muscle should be discouraged unless the context removes any ambiguity.

== See also ==
- Heinrich Müller (physiologist)
