= Long ciliary nerves =

Branch of the nasociliary nerve

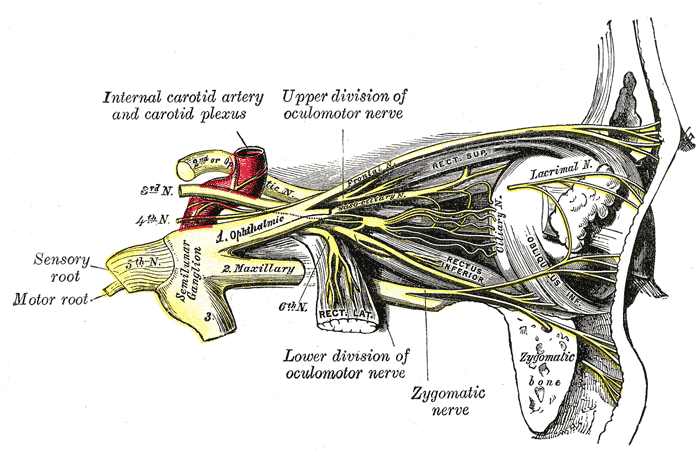
- Nerves of the orbit, and the ciliary ganglion. Side view.

Details
- From: Nasociliary nerve
- Innervates: Cornea, iris, and ciliary body
- Fiber type: "Somatosensory" (via V1 Lacrimal), and "Sympathetic" (via V2 Zygomatic)

Identifiers
- Latin: nervi ciliares longi
- TA98: A14.2.01.027
- TA2: 6206
- FMA: 52691

The long ciliary nerves are two-three sensory nerves that arise from the nasociliary nerve (itself a branch of the ophthalmic branch (CN V_{1}) of the trigeminal nerve (CN V)). They pass forward within the orbit, passing toward the eyeball alongside the optic nerve (CN II). They enter the eyeball to provide sensory innervation to the cornea, iris, and ciliary body. They also provide sympathetic visceral motor innervation to the dilator pupillae muscle, which is responsible for dilation of the pupil. The long ciliary nerves are clinically relevant in conditions affecting corneal sensitivity, pupillary responses, and surgical procedures involving the eye.

== Anatomy ==
=== Origin ===
The long ciliary nerves branch from the nasociliary nerve as it crosses the optic nerve (CN II).

=== Course ===
Accompanied by the short ciliary nerves, the long ciliary nerves pierce and enter the posterior part of the sclera near where it is entered by the optic nerve, then run anterior-ward between the sclera and the choroid.

== Function ==
The long ciliary nerves are distributed to the ciliary body, iris, and cornea.

=== Sensory ===
The long ciliary nerves provide sensory innervation to the eyeball, including the cornea.

=== Sympathetic ===
The long ciliary nerves contain post-ganglionic sympathetic fibers from the superior cervical ganglion for the dilator pupillae muscle. The sympathetic fibers to the dilator pupillae muscle mainly travel in the nasociliary nerve but there are also sympathetic fibers in the short ciliary nerves that pass through the ciliary ganglion without forming synapses.

== See also ==
- Short ciliary nerves

== Additional images ==
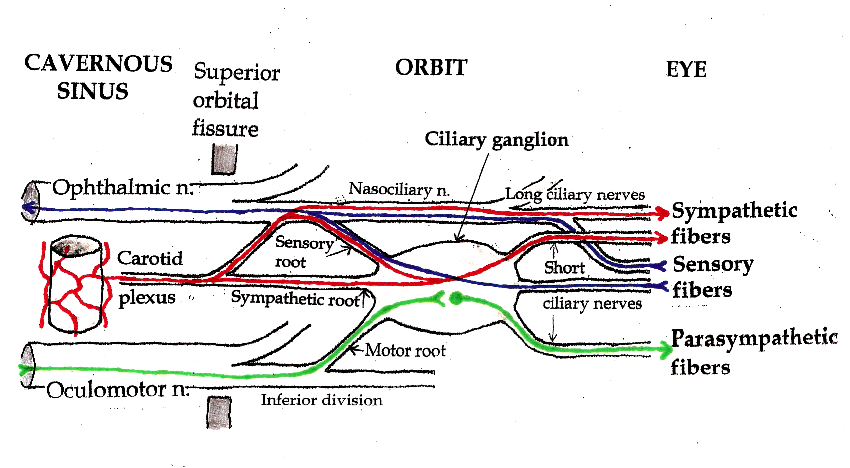
Pathways in the ciliary ganglion.
