= Anterior ethmoidal nerve =

Nerve of the nose

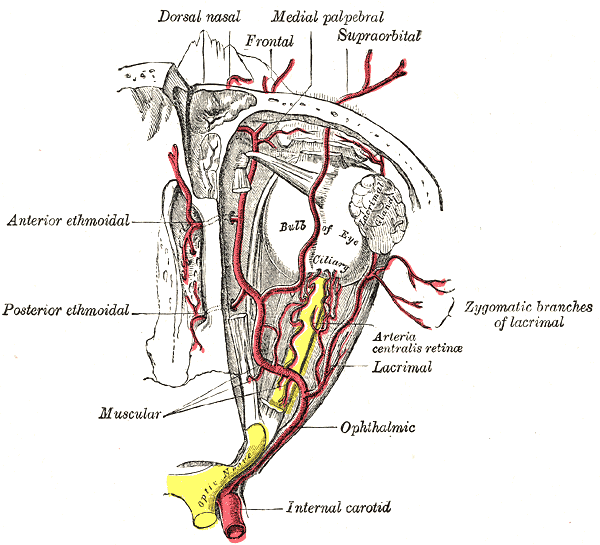
- The ophthalmic artery and its branches. (Nerve not pictured, but location is similar to artery.)

Details
- From: Nasociliary nerve
- Innervates: Meninges, nasal cavity, skin of nose

Identifiers
- Latin: nervus ethmoidalis anterior
- TA98: A14.2.01.030
- TA2: 6208
- FMA: 52675

The anterior ethmoidal nerve is a nerve of the head. It is a sensory branch of the nasociliary nerve (itself a branch of the ophthalmic nerve (CN V_{1})). It arises in the orbit, and enters first the cranial cavity and then the nasal cavity. It provides sensory innervation to part of the meninges, nasal cavity, and part of the skin of the nose. The nerve is relevant in conditions involving nasal sensation and in surgical procedures of the skull base and nasal cavity.

== Structure ==
=== Origin ===
The anterior ethmoidal nerve is a terminal branch of the nasociliary nerve, a branch of the ophthalmic nerve (CN V_{1}), itself a branch of the trigeminal nerve (CN V). It branches near the medial wall of the orbit.

=== Course ===
It passes through the anterior ethmoidal canal alongside the anterior ethmoidal artery and vein to emerge in anterior cranial fossa through the anterior ethmoidal foramen (at the junction of the cribiform plate of ethmoid bone and orbital part of frontal bone).

Within the cranial cavity, it passes anterior-ward (external to the dura mater) along a groove upon the superior surface of the cribriform plate. It descends through an aperture situated lateral to the crista galli to reach the nasal cavity.

In the nasal cavity, it passes along a groove upon the internal aspect of the nasal bone, and issuing the medial and lateral internal nasal branches.

It is continued as the external nasal nerve beyond the inferior margin of the nasal bone.

=== Distribution ===
Within the anterior cranial fossa, it gives sensory fibers to the meninges to provide sensory innervation to part of the meninges.

Its medial internal nasal branch innervates the superior and anterior portions of the nasal septum.

Its lateral internal nasal branch innervates the anterior portion of the lateral nasal wall.

It gives off branches to the roof of the nasal cavity, and bifurcates into a lateral internal nasal branch and medial internal nasal branch. It sends sensory fibers to the anterior ethmoid air cells and the middle ethmoidal air cells.

Its terminal branch - the external nasal nerve - innervates skin of the nose between the nasal bones superiorly and the tip of the nose inferiorly, except the alar portion surrounding the external nares.

== Function ==
It is involved in the diving reflex.

== Disease ==
Chronic pain in this region is known as Anterior Ethmoidal Nerve Syndrome, or AENS. One cause of this is compression of the surrounding nerve which causes sphenopalatine ganglion neuralgia, with similar clinical findings of a cluster headache, outside of further nasal symptoms. Potential treatments include the injection of anesthetics or, in more serious cases, a partial turbinectomy. The syndrome was featured in season 5, episode 3 of Grey's Anatomy.
