= Supraorbital foramen =

Opening above the eye socket, below the forehead

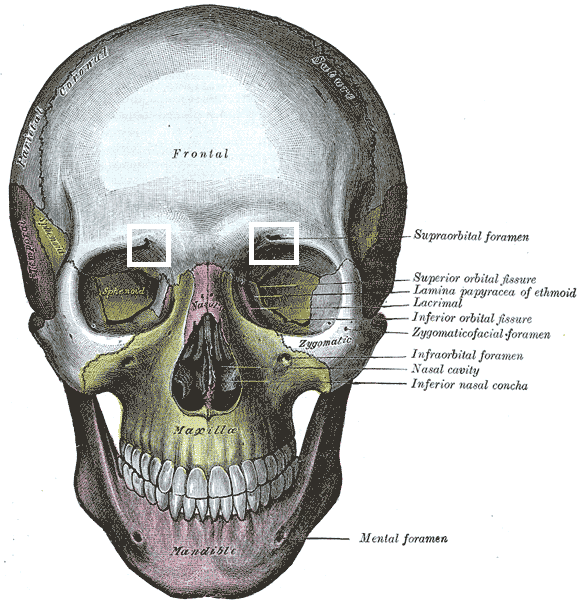
- The skull from the front. ("Supraorbital foramen" is top caption for right side white-box.)

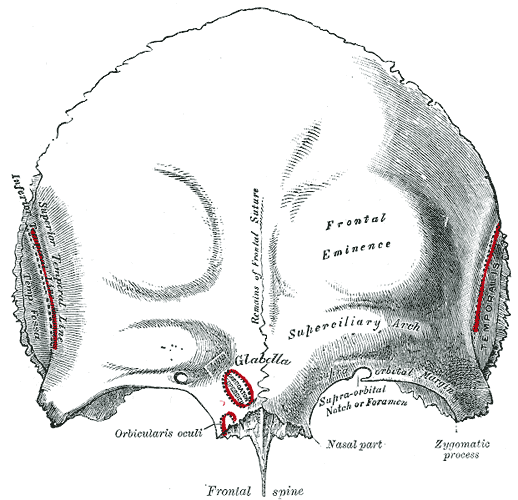
- Frontal bone. Outer surface. ("Supraorbital notch or foramen" labeled at lower right arch.)

Details

Identifiers
- Latin: foramen supraorbitale
- TA98: A02.1.03.009
- TA2: 527
- FMA: 57412

The supraorbital foramen, is a bony elongated opening located above the orbit (eye socket) and under the forehead. It is part of the frontal bone of the skull. The supraorbital foramen lies directly under the eyebrow. In some people this foramen is incomplete and is then known as the supraorbital notch.

== Structure ==
The supraorbital foramen is a small groove at superior and medial margin of the orbit in the frontal bone. It is part of the frontal bone of the skull. It arches transversely below the superciliary arches and is the upper part of the brow ridge. It is thin and prominent in its lateral two-thirds, but rounded in its medial third. Between these two parts, the supraorbital nerve, the supraorbital artery, and the supraorbital vein pass. The supraorbital nerve divides into superficial and deep branches after it has left the supraorbital foramen.

== Additional images ==
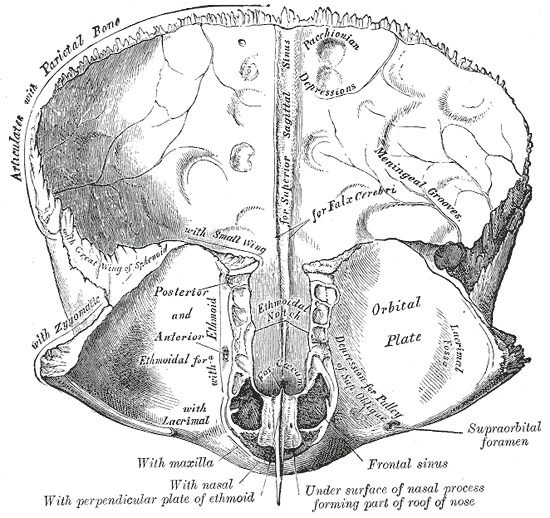
Frontal bone. Inner surface.

Side view of head, showing surface relations of bones

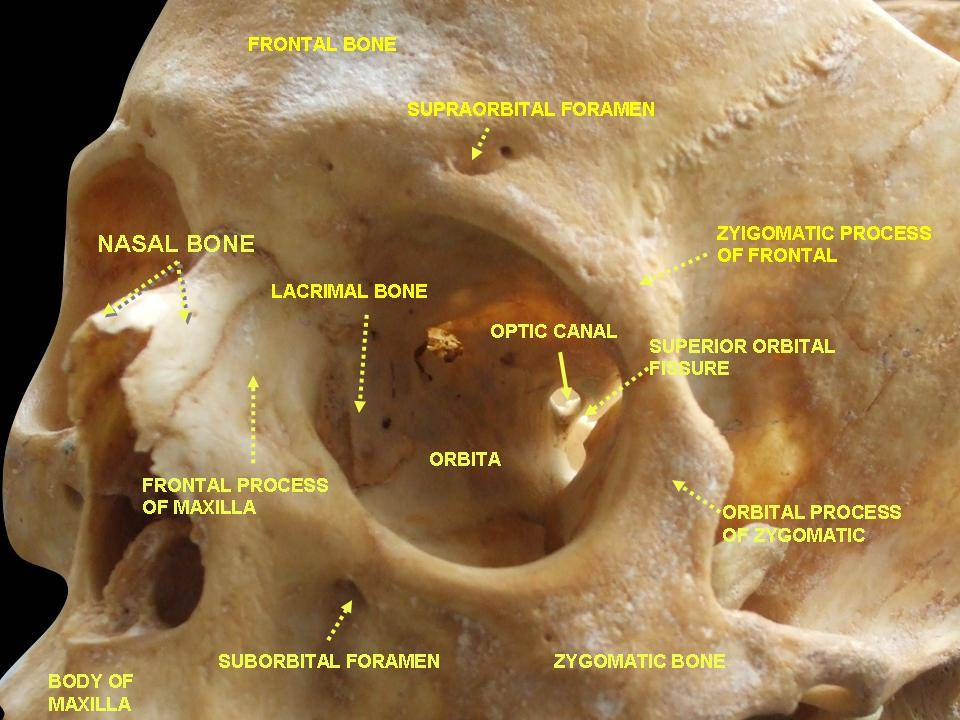
Cranium. Supraorbital foramen.

== See also ==
- Foramina of skull
- Frontal bone
- Supraorbital ridge
