= Anterior cranial fossa =

Part of the human skull

- Superior view of the skull base. Anterior cranial fossa shown in green. 1: Sphenoidal limbus (anterior margin of the chiasmatic groove) 2: Posterior borders of the lesser wings of the sphenoid

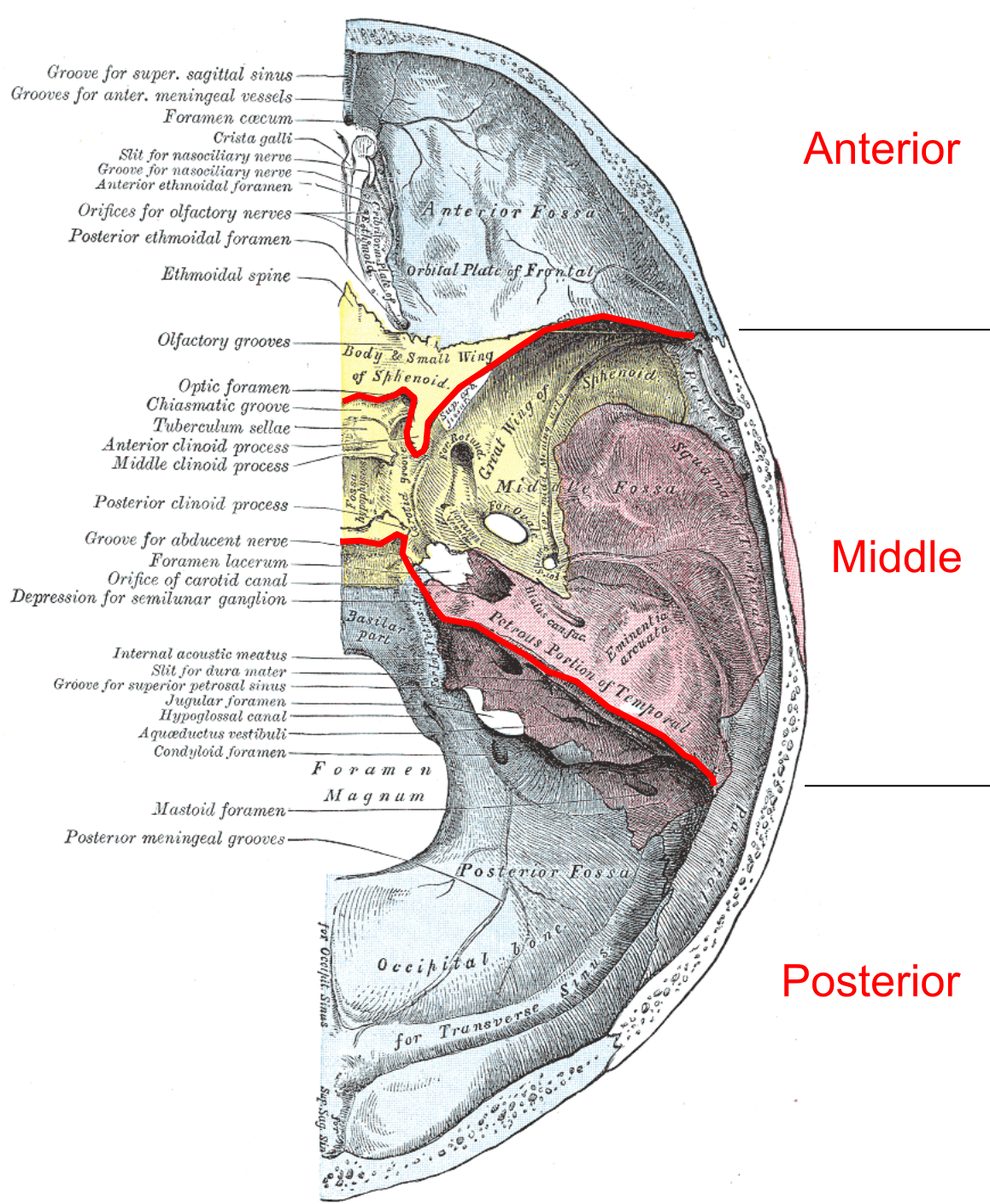
- Base of skull. Superior view. Boundaries of the cranial fossae drawn as red lines.

Details

Identifiers
- Latin: fossa cranii anterior
- MeSH: D035262
- TA98: A02.1.00.048
- TA2: 451
- FMA: 9682

The anterior cranial fossa is a depression in the floor of the cranial base which houses the projecting frontal lobes of the brain. It is formed by the orbital plates of the frontal, the cribriform plate of the ethmoid, and the small wings and front part of the body of the sphenoid; it is limited behind by the posterior borders of the small wings of the sphenoid and by the anterior margin of the chiasmatic groove. The lesser wings of the sphenoid separate the anterior and middle fossae.

== Structure ==
It is traversed by the frontoethmoidal, sphenoethmoidal, and sphenofrontal sutures.

Its lateral portions roof in the orbital cavities and support the frontal lobes of the cerebrum; they are convex and marked by depressions for the brain convolutions, and grooves for branches of the meningeal vessels.

The central portion corresponds with the roof of the nasal cavity, and is markedly depressed on either side of the crista galli.

It presents, in and near the median line, from before backward, the commencement of the frontal crest for the attachment of the falx cerebri; the foramen cecum, between the frontal bone and the crista galli of the ethmoid, which usually transmits a small vein from the nasal cavity to the superior sagittal sinus; behind the foramen cecum, the crista galli, the free margin of which affords attachment to the falx cerebri; on either side of the crista galli, the olfactory groove formed by the cribriform plate, which supports the olfactory bulb and presents foramina for the transmission of the olfactory nerves, and in front a slit-like opening for the nasociliary nerve.

Lateral to either olfactory groove are the internal openings of the anterior and posterior ethmoidal foramina; the anterior, situated about the middle of the lateral margin of the olfactory groove, transmits the anterior ethmoidal vessels and the nasociliary nerve; the nerve runs in a groove along the lateral edge of the cribriform plate to the slit-like opening above mentioned; the posterior ethmoidal foramen opens at the back part of this margin under cover of the projecting lamina of the sphenoid, and transmits the posterior ethmoidal vessels and nerve.

Further back in the middle line is the ethmoidal spine, bounded behind by a slight elevation separating two shallow longitudinal grooves which support the olfactory lobes.

Behind this is the anterior margin of the chiasmatic groove, running laterally on either side to the upper margin of the optic foramen.

== Content ==
The anterior cranial fossa contains the following parts of the brain:

- frontal lobe of the cerebral cortex,
- olfactory bulb,
- olfactory tract,
- orbital gyri.

== Openings ==
There are several openings connecting the anterior cranial fossa with other parts of the skull, and these are the following:

- anterior ethmoidal foramen,
- cribriform foramina.

The paired anterior ethmoidal foramen connects the anterior cranial fossa with each orbit and transmits the anterior ethmoidal artery, nerve and vein.

The cribriform foramina are the openings in the cribriform plate of the ethmoid bone, which connect the anterior cranial fossa with the nasal cavity and transmit the olfactory nerves.

== Development ==
The anterior cranial fossa, which supports the frontal lobes, plays a critical role in brain development. Abnormalities in this region can result in motor and cognitive impairments, making its study essential. During prenatal development, the cranial base angle—formed between the nasion and basion points—changes significantly, reflecting the shift toward an upright posture. This angle is useful in assessing both normal and pathological development.

== Additional images ==
Animation. Anterior cranial fossa shown in green.

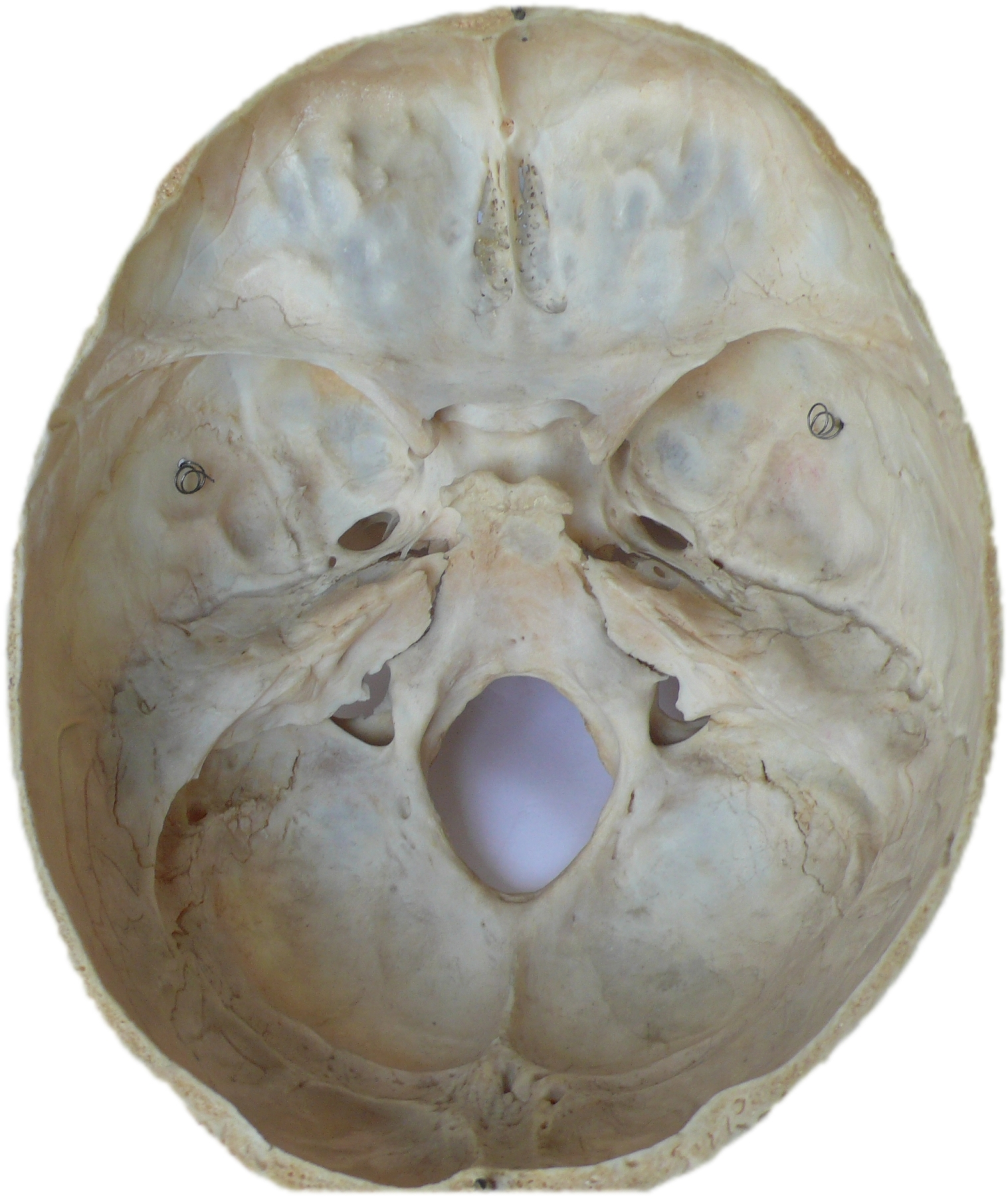
Photo. Base of skull. Superior view.

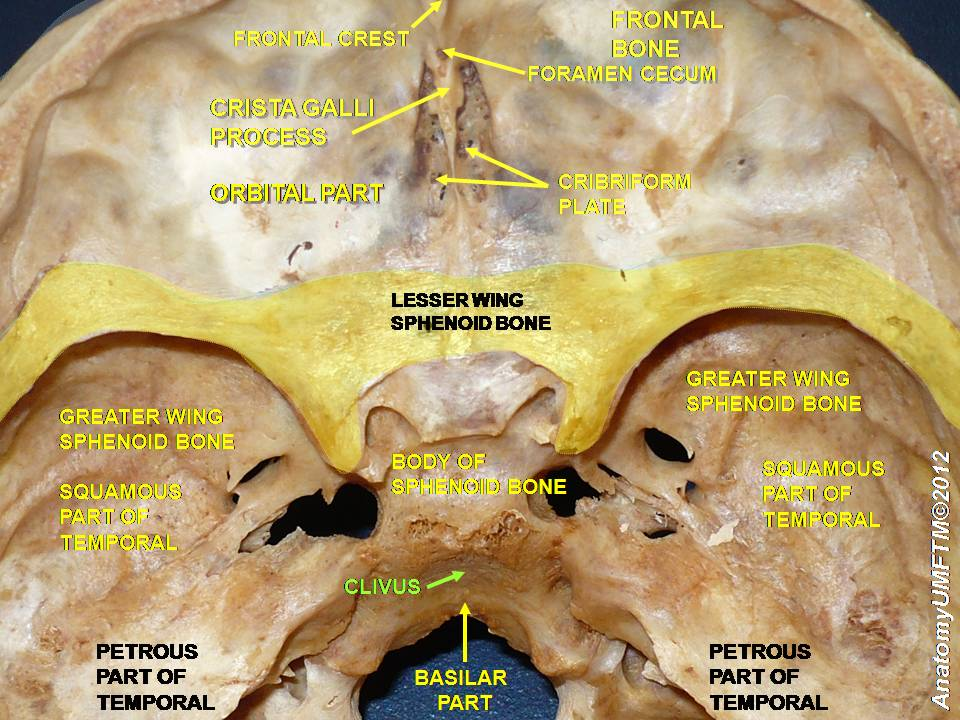
Close-up photo. Lesser wings of the sphenoid colored in yellow.

== See also ==
- Middle cranial fossa
- Posterior cranial fossa
