= External nasal nerve =

Terminal branch of the anterior ethmoidal nerve

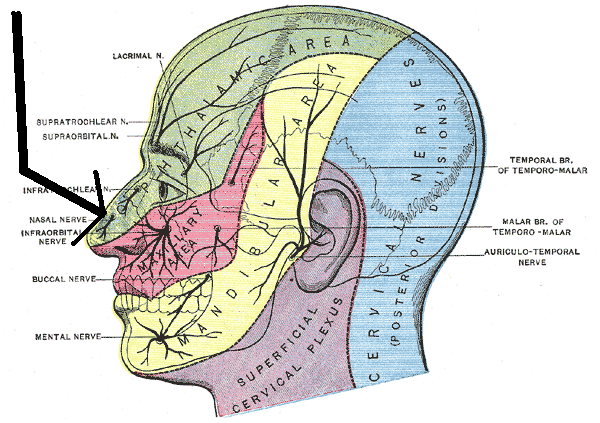
- Sensory innervation to the head and neck. The external nasal nerve can be seen emerging from beneath the nasal bone (see tip of black arrow).

Details
- From: Anterior ethmoidal nerve
- Innervates: External skin of nose to the tip

Identifiers
- Latin: ramus nasalis externus nervi ethmoidalis anterioris
- TA98: A14.2.01.034
- TA2: 6212
- FMA: 52688

The external nasal nerve is the terminal sensory branch of the anterior ethmoidal nerve. It emerges between the nasal bone and the lateral nasal cartilage after passing from the nasal cavity to the external surface of the nose. It provides sensory innervation to the area of skin of the nose between the nasal bones superiorly and the tip of the nose inferiorly (excluding the alar portion surrounding the external nares). It is relevant in surgical and cosmetic procedures involving the external nose and may be a source of sensory disturbance following nasal trauma or rhinoplasty.
