= Orbitalis muscle =

Muscle of the eye

Details
- Nerve: Sympathetic Nerves
- Actions: protrusion of eyeball

Identifiers
- Latin: musculus orbitalis
- TA98: A15.2.07.009
- TA2: 6820
- FMA: 49034

The orbitalis muscle is a vestigial or rudimentary nonstriated muscle (smooth muscle) that crosses from the infraorbital groove and sphenomaxillary fissure and is intimately united with the periosteum of the orbit. It was described by Heinrich Müller and is often called Müller's muscle. It lies at the back of the orbit and spans the infraorbital fissure. It is a thin layer of smooth muscle that bridges the inferior orbital fissure. It is supplied by sympathetic nerves, and its function is unknown.

== Function ==
The muscle forms an important part of the lateral orbital wall in some animals and can act to change the wall's volume in lower mammals, while in humans it is not known to have any significant function, but its contraction may possibly produce a slight forward protrusion of the eyeball. Several sources have suggested a role in the autonomic regulation of the vascular system due to the pattern of innervation of the orbitalis.

== Pathology ==
Horner's syndrome causes paralysis of the structures of the eye and orbit that receive sympathetic innervation. The signs of Horner's syndrome are ptosis, miosis, anhidrosis, and (apparent) enophthalmos. While some attribute the enophthalmos of Horner's Syndrome to paralysis of the orbitalis muscle, this is inaccurate. Enophthalmos in Horner's syndrome is an illusion created by the subtle ptosis of the upper eyelid caused by paralysis of the superior tarsal muscle.

Sinking in of the eye (true enophthalmos) is possibly caused by paralysis of the smooth (orbitalis) muscle in the floor of the orbit.

== Eponym ==
While the orbitalis muscle is also known as Müller's muscle, the use of this term should be discouraged to avoid confusion with the superior tarsal muscle and the circular fibres of the ciliary muscle.
