= Anterior ethmoidal foramen =

Opening in the ethmoid bone in the skull

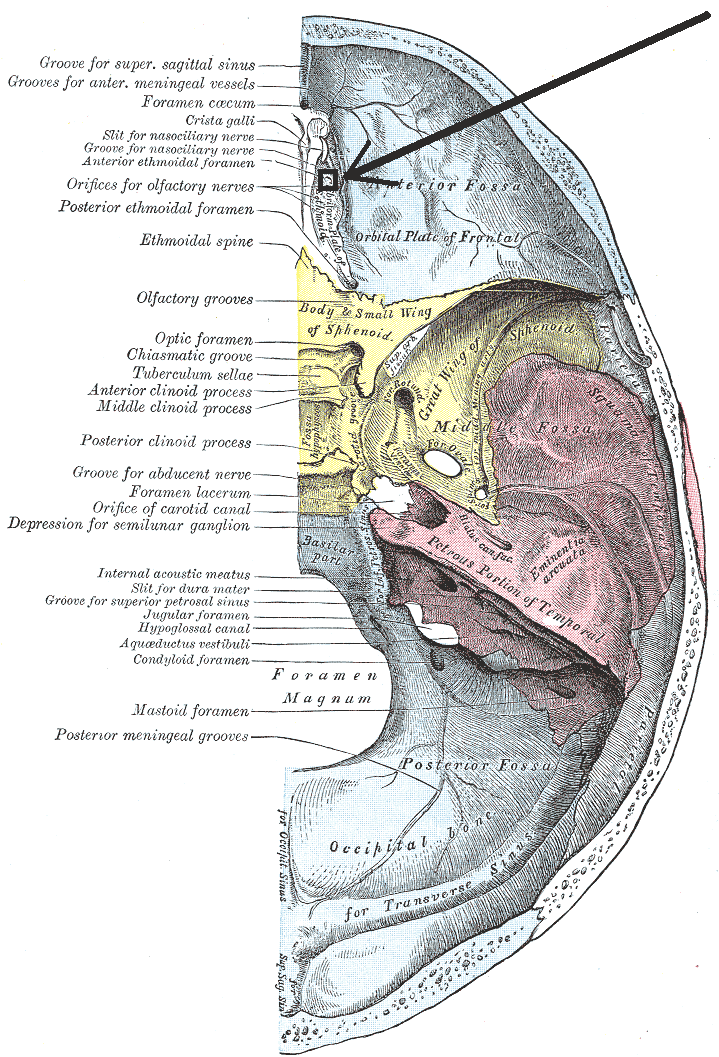
- Base of the skull. Upper surface. (On the left, "Anterior ethmoidal foramen" is the 7th label from the right.)

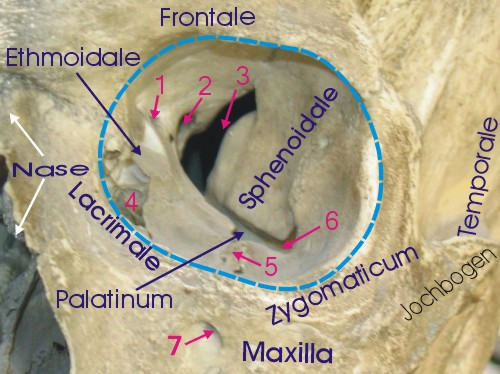
- 1 Foramen ethmoidale, 2 Canalis opticus, 3 Fissura orbitalis superior, 4 Fossa sacci lacrimalis, 5 Sulcus infraorbitalis, 6 Fissura orbitalis inferior, 7 Foramen infraorbitale

Details

Identifiers
- Latin: foramen ethmoidale anterius
- TA98: A02.1.00.079
- TA2: 484
- FMA: 53135

The anterior ethmoidal foramen is a small opening in the ethmoid bone in the skull.

Lateral to either olfactory groove are the internal openings of the anterior and posterior ethmoidal foramina (or canals).

The anterior ethmoidal foramen, situated about the middle of the lateral margin of the olfactory groove, transmits the anterior ethmoidal artery, vein and nerve. The anterior ethmoidal nerve, a branch of the nasociliary nerve, runs in a groove along the lateral edge of the cribriform plate to the above-mentioned slit-like opening .
