= Posterior ethmoidal foramen =

Internal openings of the anterior and posterior ethmoidal foramina

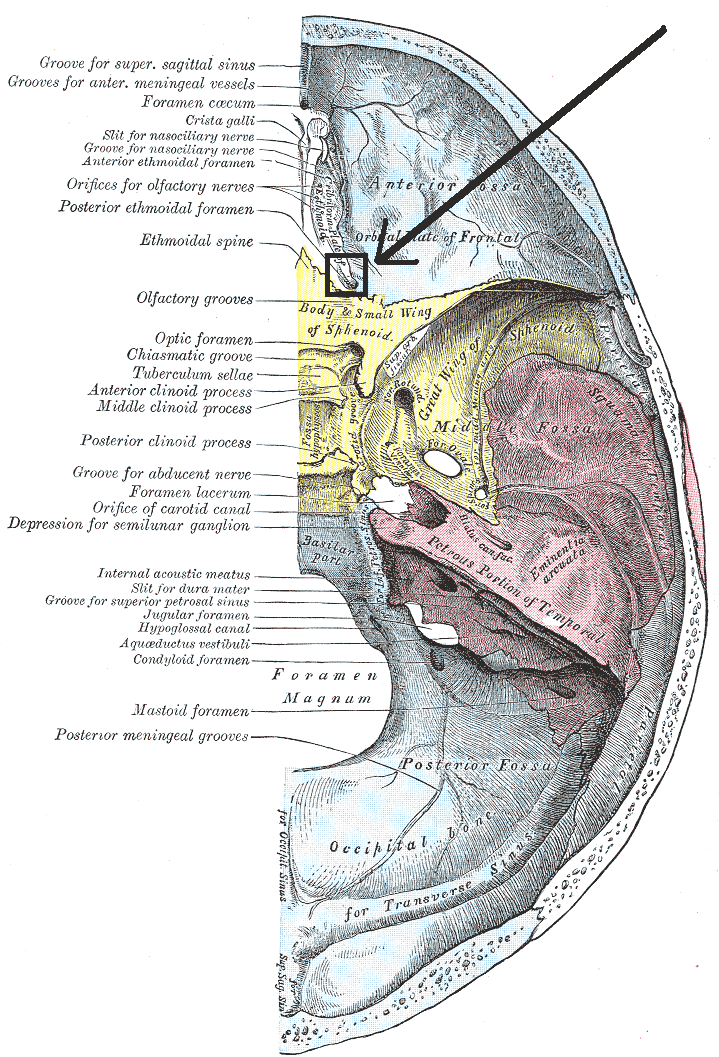
- Base of the skull. Upper surface. (On the left, "Posterior ethmoidal foramen" is the 9thlabel from the right.

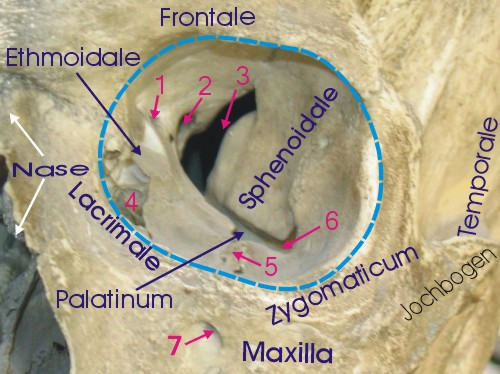
- 1 Foramen ethmoidale, 2 Canalis opticus, 3 Fissura orbitalis superior, 4 Fossa sacci lacrimalis, 5 Sulcus infraorbitalis, 6 Fissura orbitalis inferior, 7 Foramen infraorbitale

Details

Identifiers
- Latin: foramen ethmoidale posterius
- TA98: A02.1.00.080
- TA2: 485
- FMA: 53136

Lateral to either olfactory groove are the internal openings of the anterior and posterior ethmoidal foramina (or canals).

The posterior ethmoidal foramen opens at the back part of this margin under cover of the projecting lamina of the sphenoid, and transmits the posterior ethmoidal vessels and nerve.
