= Levator palpebrae superioris muscle =

Muscle in orbit that elevates upper eyelid

Levator palpebrae superioris
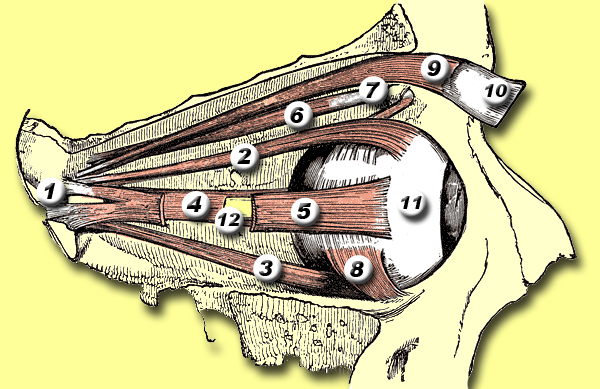
- Rectus muscles: 2 = superior, 3 = inferior, 4 = medial, 5 = lateral Oblique muscles: 6 = superior, 8 = inferior Other muscle: 9 = levator palpebrae superioris Other structures: 1 = Annulus of Zinn, 7 = Trochlea, 10 = Superior tarsus, 11 = Sclera, 12 = Optic nerve

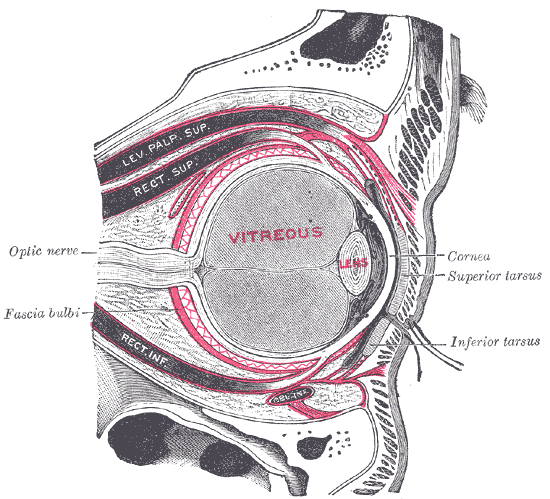
- The levator palpebrae superioris can be seen here, travelling above the superior rectus muscle, and ending at the upper eyelid.

Details
- Origin: Inferior surface of lesser wing of sphenoid
- Insertion: Superior tarsal plate and skin of upper eyelid
- Artery: Muscular branches of ophthalmic artery and supraorbital artery
- Nerve: Superior division of oculomotor nerve
- Actions: Elevation of upper eyelid
- Antagonist: Palpebral part of orbicularis oculi muscle

Identifiers
- Latin: musculus levator palpebrae superioris
- TA98: A15.2.07.020
- TA2: 2052
- FMA: 49041

The levator palpebrae superioris (Latin: elevating muscle of upper eyelid) is the muscle in the orbit that elevates the upper eyelid.

== Structure ==
The levator palpebrae superioris originates from inferior surface of the lesser wing of the sphenoid bone, just above the optic foramen. It broadens and decreases in thickness (becomes thinner) and becomes the levator aponeurosis. This portion inserts on the skin of the upper eyelid, as well as the superior tarsal plate. It is a skeletal muscle. The superior tarsal muscle, a smooth muscle, is attached to the levator palpebrae superioris, and inserts on the superior tarsal plate as well.

=== Blood supply ===
The levator palpebrae superioris receives its blood supply from branches of the ophthalmic artery, specifically, muscular branches and the supraorbital artery. Blood is drained into the superior ophthalmic vein.

=== Nerve supply ===
The levator palpebrae superioris receives motor innervation from the superior division of the oculomotor nerve. The smooth muscle that originates from its undersurface, called the superior tarsal muscle is innervated by postganglionic sympathetic axons from the superior cervical ganglion.

== Function ==
The levator palpebrae superioris elevates the upper eyelid.

== Clinical significance ==
Damage to this muscle or its innervation can cause ptosis, which is drooping of the eyelid. Lesions in CN III can cause ptosis, because without stimulation from the oculomotor nerve the levator palpebrae cannot oppose the force of gravity, and the eyelid droops.

Ptosis can also result from damage to the adjoining superior tarsal muscle or its sympathetic innervation. Such damage to the sympathetic supply occurs in Horner's syndrome and presents as a partial ptosis. It is important to distinguish between these two very different causes of ptosis. This can usually be done clinically without issue, as each type of ptosis is accompanied by other distinct clinical findings.

The ptosis seen in paralysis of the levator palpebrae superioris is usually more pronounced than that seen due to paralysis of the superior tarsal muscle.

== Additional images ==
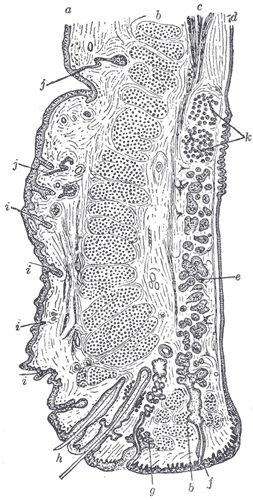
Sagittal section through the upper eyelid.

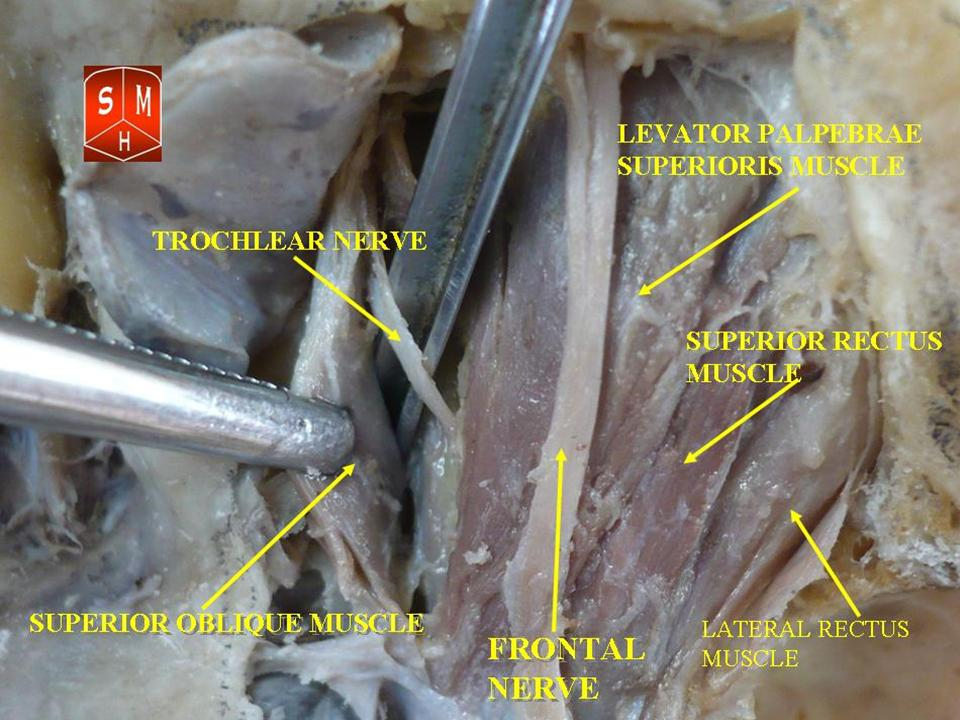
Levator palpebrae superioris muscle

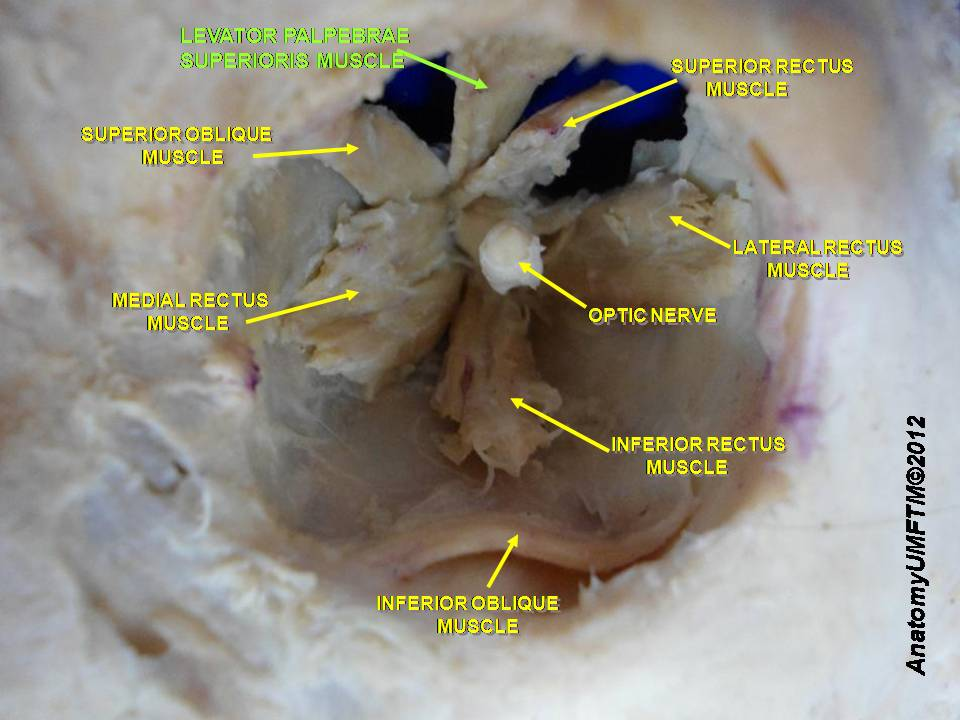
Levator palpebrae superioris muscle

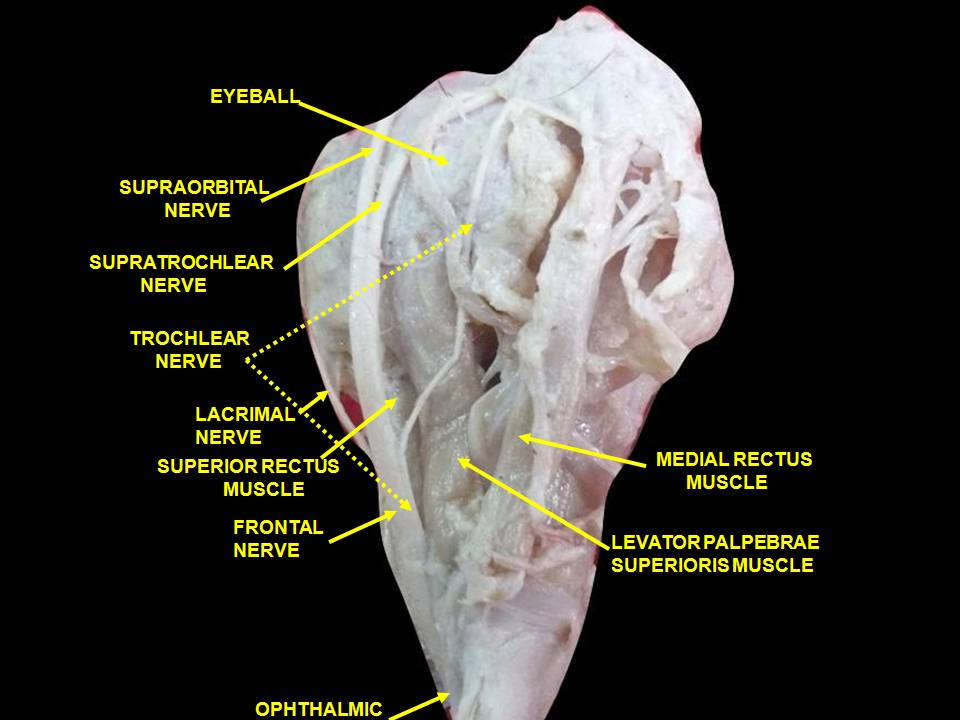
Extrinsic eye muscle. Nerves of orbita. Deep dissection.

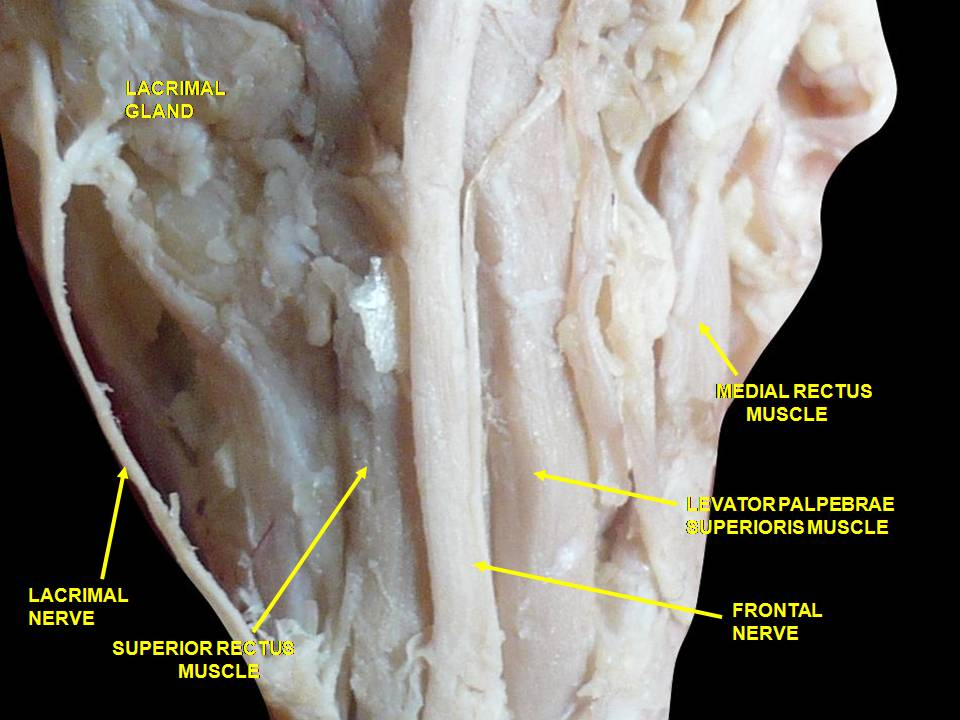
Extrinsic eye muscle. Nerves of orbita. Deep dissection.

== See also ==
- Blepharospasm
- Ptosis
- Superior tarsal muscle
