= Medial pterygoid =

Medial pterygoid may refer to:

- Medial pterygoid muscle
- Medial pterygoid nerve
- Medial pterygoid plate
