= Maxillary tuberosity =

Rounded eminence of the maxilla

Maxillary
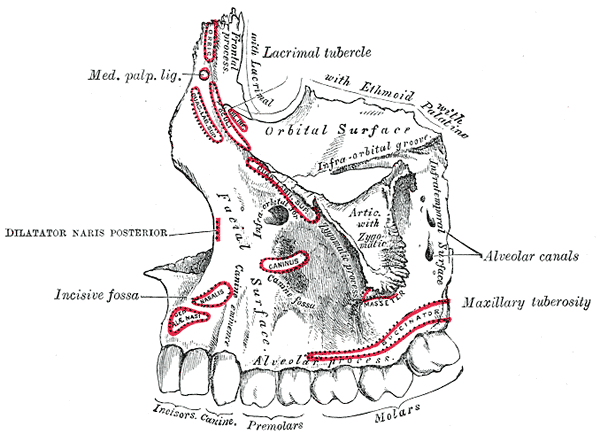
- Left maxilla. Outer surface. (Maxillary tuberosity labeled at center right.)

Details

Identifiers
- Latin: tuber maxillae
- TA98: A02.1.12.016
- TA2: 773
- FMA: 57731

At the lower part of the infratemporal surface of the maxilla is a rounded eminence, the maxillary tuberosity, especially prominent after the growth of the wisdom tooth; it is rough on its lateral side for articulation with the pyramidal process of the palatine bone and in some cases articulates with the lateral pterygoid plate of the sphenoid.

It gives origin to a few fibers of the medial pterygoid muscle.
