= Filippo Civinini =

Italian anatomist (1805–1844)

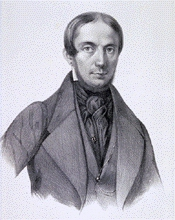
Filippo Civinini (1805–1844)

Filippo Civinini (20 September 1805 – 11 May 1844) was an Italian anatomist from Pistoia. He is remembered for contributions made in the field of osteology, in particular the cranium.

He studied medicine in Pistoia and Pisa, where in 1825 he earned his degree. In 1834 he was appointed anatomical dissector, and two years later attained the chair of anatomy at the University of Pisa. He composed the first catalogue on the collections of anatomy at the Museum of Pisa.

In 1835 Civinini provided the first description of a neuroma that causes a painful foot condition known today as Morton's metatarsalgia. He made the discovery during the dissection of a cadaver, which he described in an article called "Su un nervoso gangliare rigonfiamento alla pianta del piede" (On the neural ganglion swelling on the sole of the foot).

== Associated eponyms ==
- Civinini's canal: the anterior canaliculus of chorda tympani, or iter chordae anterius.
- Civinini's ligament: the pterygospinal ligament.
- Civinini's process: The pterygoid processes of the sphenoid bone or processus pterygospinosus.
- Foramen of Civinini: Foramen pterygospinosum.
