= Superior nasal concha =

Anatomical feature

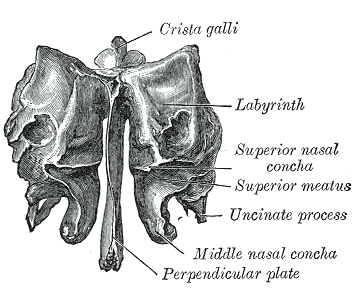
- Ethmoid bone from behind

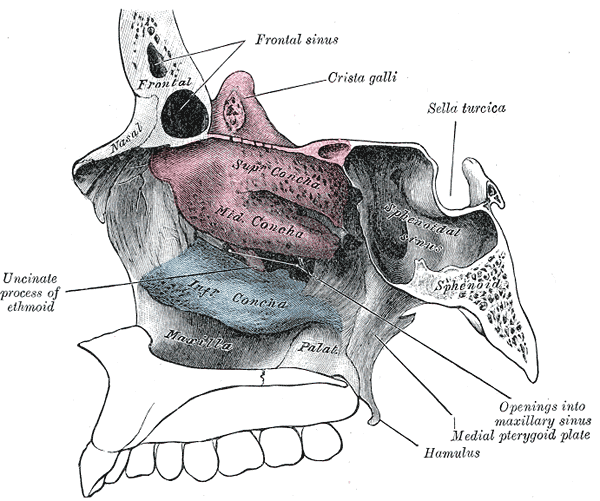
- Lateral wall of nasal cavity, showing ethmoid bone in position. (Superior nasal concha is at top of pink region.)

Details

Identifiers
- Latin: concha nasi superior, concha nasalis superior
- TA98: A06.1.02.013; A02.1.07.013
- TA2: 734
- FMA: 57458

The superior nasal concha is a small, curved plate of bone representing a medial bony process of the labyrinth of the ethmoid bone. The superior nasal concha forms the roof of the superior nasal meatus.

== Anatomy ==
=== Anatomical relations ===
The superior nasal concha is situated posterosuperiorly to the middle nasal concha. It forms the superior boundary of the superior nasal meatus. Superior to the superior nasal concha is the sphenoethmoidal recess where the sphenoid sinus communicates with the nasal cavity; the sphenoethmoidal recess is interposed between the superior nasal concha, and (the anterior aspect of) the body of sphenoid bone. The sphenoid sinus ostium exists medial to the superior turbinate.

== Additional images ==
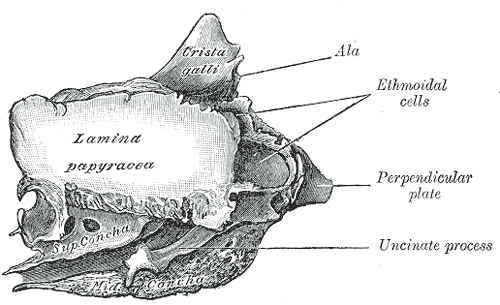
Ethmoid bone from the right side

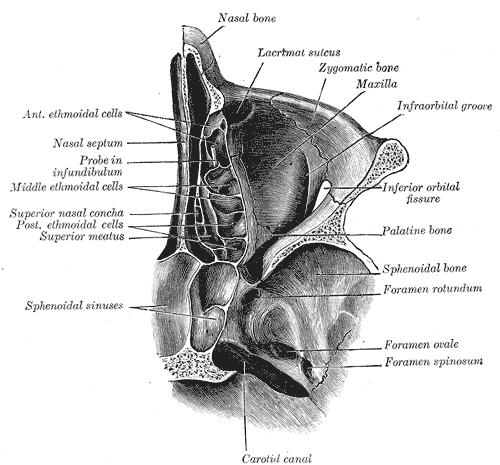
Horizontal section of nasal and orbital cavities

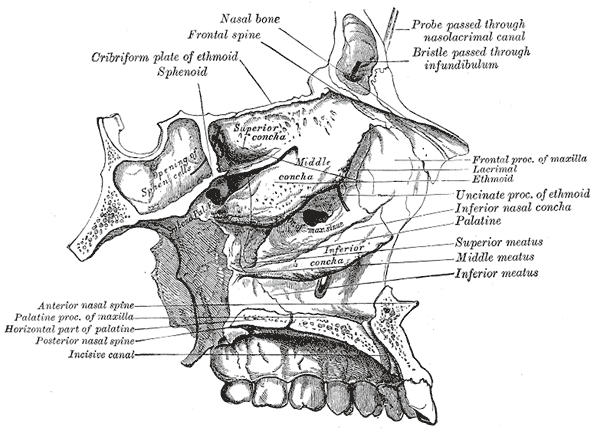
Roof, floor, and lateral wall of left nasal cavity

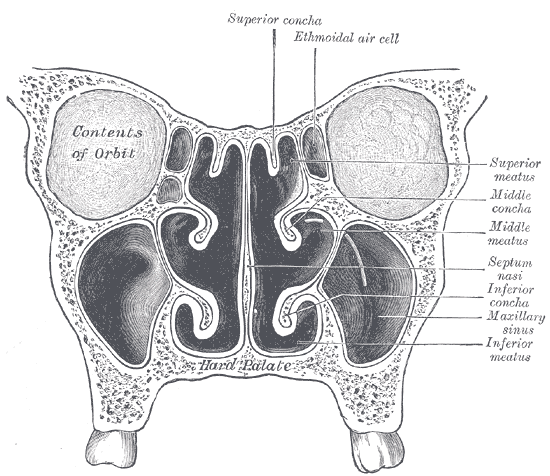
Coronal section of nasal cavities

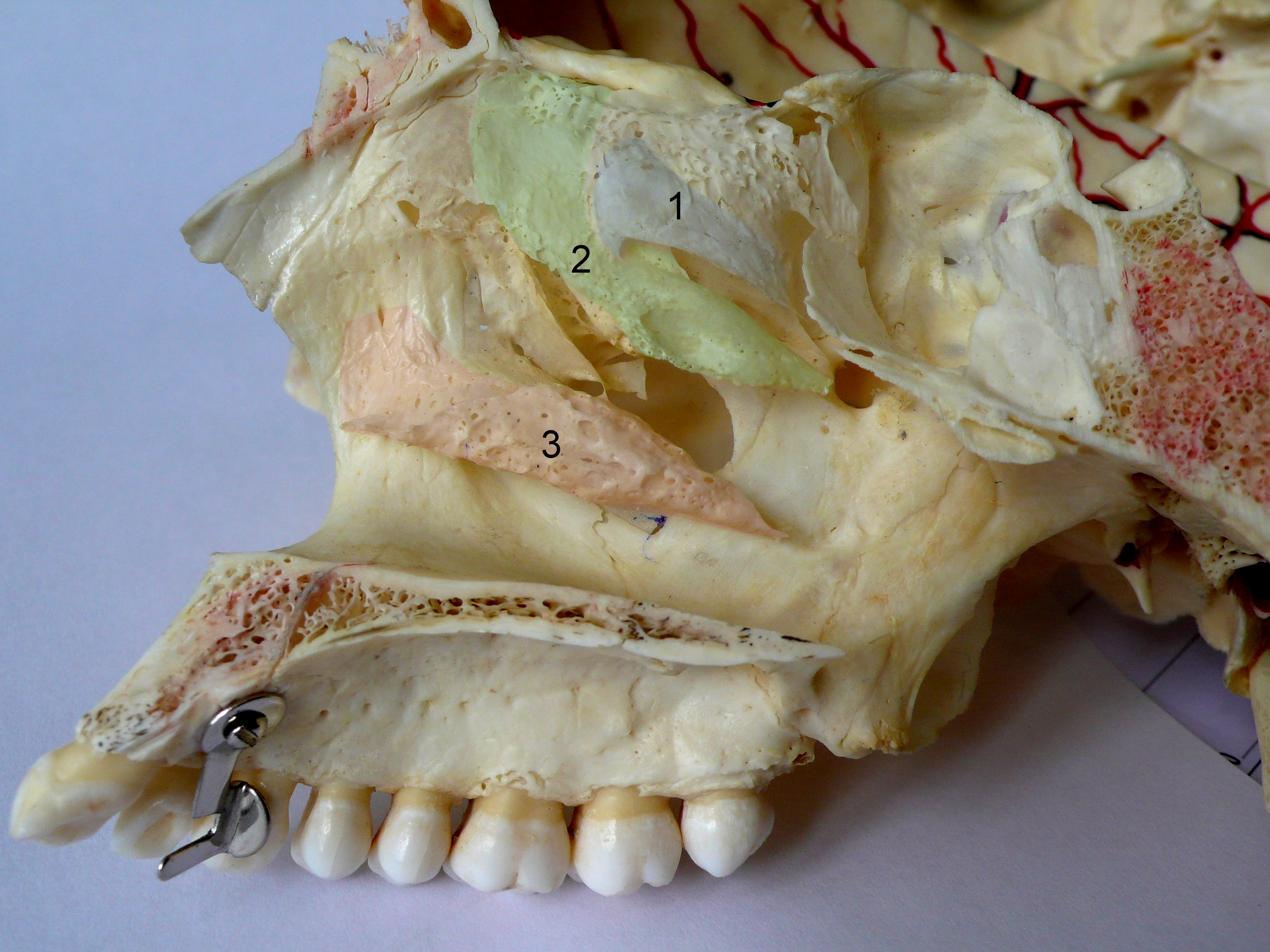
Nasal conchae
