= Pterygoid =

Pterygoid, from the Greek for 'winglike', may refer to:

- Pterygoid bone, a bone of the palate of many vertebrates
- Pterygoid processes of the sphenoid bone
  - Lateral pterygoid plate
  - Medial pterygoid plate
- Lateral pterygoid muscle
- Medial pterygoid muscle
- a branch of the Mandibular nerve
