= Internal pterygoid =

Internal pterygoid is the obsolete attribution for medial pterygoid, and refers to:

- Medial pterygoid muscle
- Medial pterygoid nerve
