= Processus pyramidalis =

Processus pyramidalis can refer to:

- Pyramidal process of palatine bone (processus pyramidalis ossis palatini)
- Pyramidal lobe of thyroid gland (lobus pyramidalis glandulae thyroideae) sometimes referred to as processus pyramidalis glandulae thyroideae
