= Sphenoethmoidal recess =

Anatomical feature in the nose

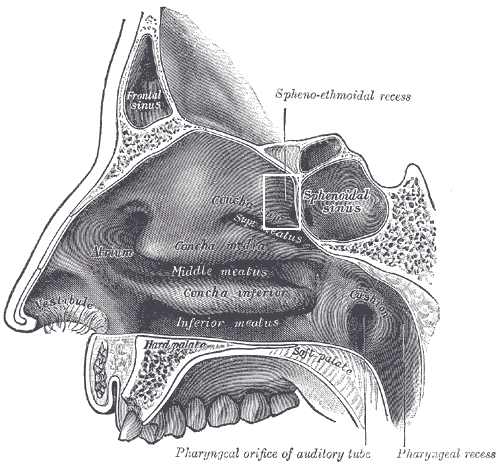
- Lateral wall of nasal cavity (sphenoethmoidal recess labeled at top)

Details

Identifiers
- Latin: recessus sphenoethmoidalis
- TA98: A06.1.02.022; A02.1.00.094
- TA2: 499
- FMA: 59734

The sphenoethmoidal recess is a small triangular space superior to the superior nasal meatus of the nasal cavity into which the sphenoidal sinus opens. The sphenoethmoidal recess is situated superoposterior to the superior nasal concha, between the superior nasal concha and the anterior aspect of the body of the sphenoid bone.

== Anatomy ==
=== Variation ===
When present, the supreme nasal concha is situated upon the lateral wall of the sphenoethmoid recess, with the supreme nasal meatus created below it occasionally presenting an opening of the posterior ethmoidal sinus.
