= Sphenoid =

Sphenoid may refer to:

- Sphenoid bone, a bone in anatomy
- Sphenoid (geometry), a tetrahedron with 2-fold mirror or rotation symmetry
