= Pterygoid notch =

Anatomical feature

Identifiers
- TA98: A02.1.05.045
- TA2: 631
- FMA: 75050

The Pterygoid notch (incisura pterygoidea) is a notch on the inferior portion of the pterygoid processes of the sphenoid bone, between the medial and lateral plates into which the pyramidal process of the palatine bone is fitted.
