= Pterygospinous process =

Bone process in the skull

Pterygospinous process, also known as the Civinini process or processus pterygospinosus, is a sharp spine on the posterior edge of the lateral pterygoid plate of the sphenoid bone. The pterygospinous process is attached pterygospinous ligament which stretches towards the spine of the sphenoid.
