= Sphenoidal conchae =

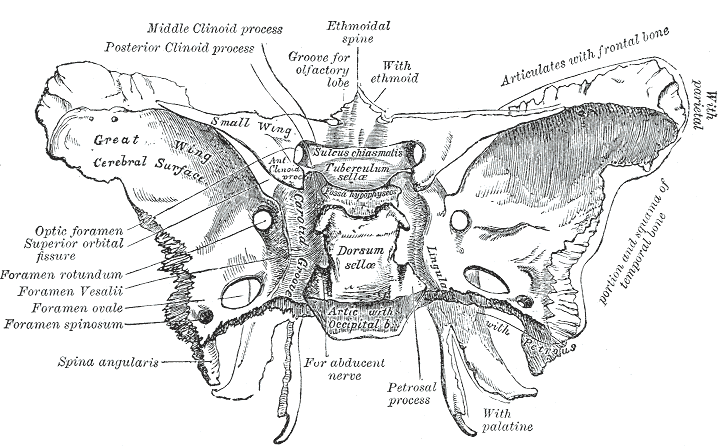
- Sphenoid bone, upper surface

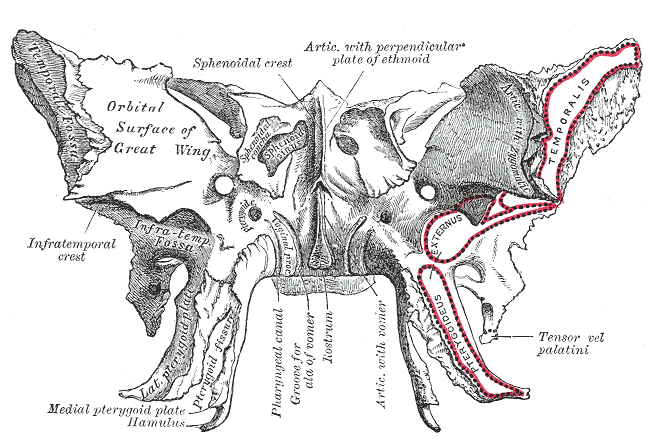
- Sphenoid bone, anterior and inferior surfaces

Details

Identifiers
- Latin: concha sphenoidalis
- TA98: A02.1.05.019
- TA2: 603
- FMA: 54733

The sphenoidal conchae (sphenoidal turbinated processes) are two thin, curved plates, situated at the anterior and lower part of the body of the sphenoid. An aperture of variable size exists in the anterior wall of each, and through this the sphenoidal sinus opens into the nasal cavity.

Each is irregular in form, and tapers to a point behind, being broader and thinner in front.

Its upper surface is concave, and looks toward the cavity of the sinus; its under surface is convex, and forms part of the roof of the corresponding nasal cavity.

Each bone articulates in front with the ethmoid, laterally with the palatine; its pointed posterior extremity is placed above the vomer, and is received between the root of the pterygoid process laterally and the rostrum of the sphenoid medially.

A small portion of the sphenoidal concha sometimes enters into the formation of the medial wall of the orbit, between the lamina papyracea of the ethmoid in front, the orbital plate of the palatine below, and the frontal bone above.
