= Pterygoid fossa =

Depression in the sphenoid bone of the skull

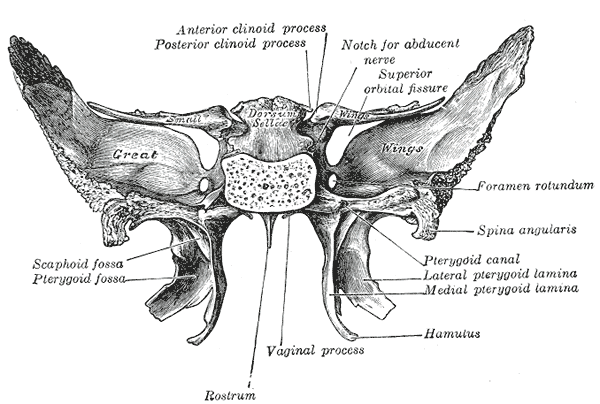
- Sphenoid bone. Upper and posterior surfaces. (Pterygoid fossa labeled at left.)

Details

Identifiers
- Latin: fossa pterygoidea ossis sphenoidalis
- TA98: A02.1.05.046
- TA2: 632
- FMA: 84970

The pterygoid fossa is an anatomical term for the fossa formed by the divergence of the lateral pterygoid plate and the medial pterygoid plate of the sphenoid bone.

== Structure ==
The lateral and medial pterygoid plates (of the pterygoid process of the sphenoid bone) diverge behind and enclose between them a V-shaped fossa, the pterygoid fossa. This fossa faces posteriorly, and contains the medial pterygoid muscle and the tensor veli palatini muscle.

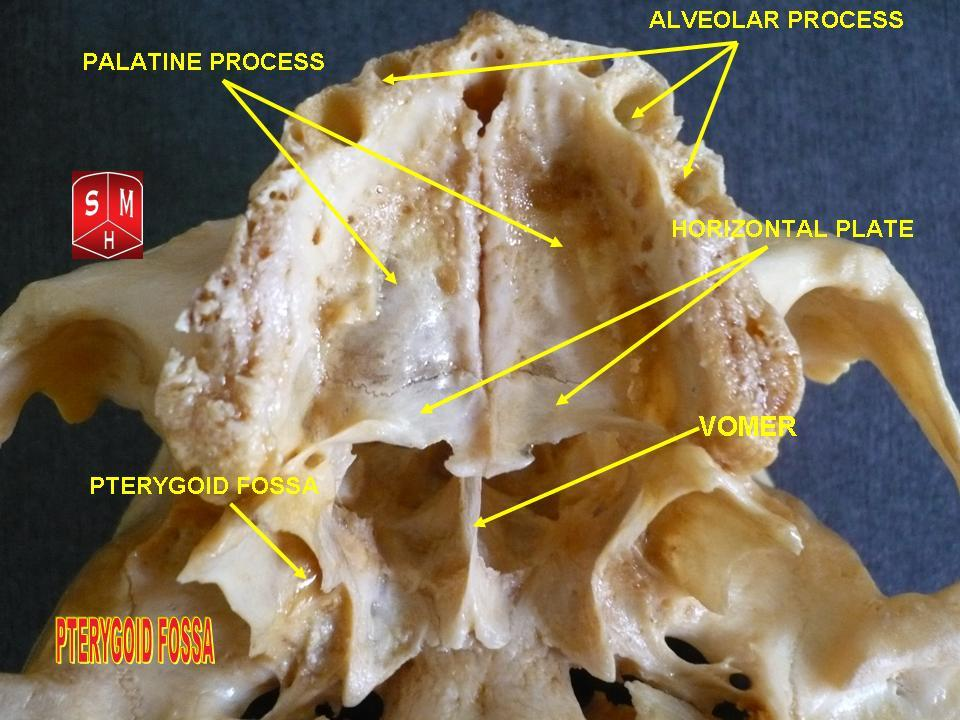
Pterygoid fossa

== See also ==
- Pterygoid fovea
- Scaphoid fossa
- Pterygoid process
