= Ethmoidal spine =

Ridge of the sphenoid bone

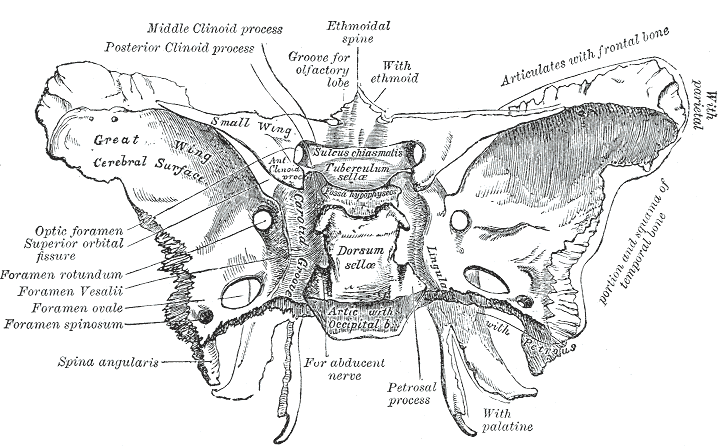
- Sphenoid bone. Upper surface. (Ethmoidal spine visible at top.)

The superior surface of the body of the sphenoid bone (Fig. 145) presents in front a prominent spine, the ethmoidal spine, for articulation with the cribriform plate of the ethmoid; behind this is a smooth surface slightly raised in the middle line, and grooved on either side for the olfactory lobes of the brain.

== Additional images ==
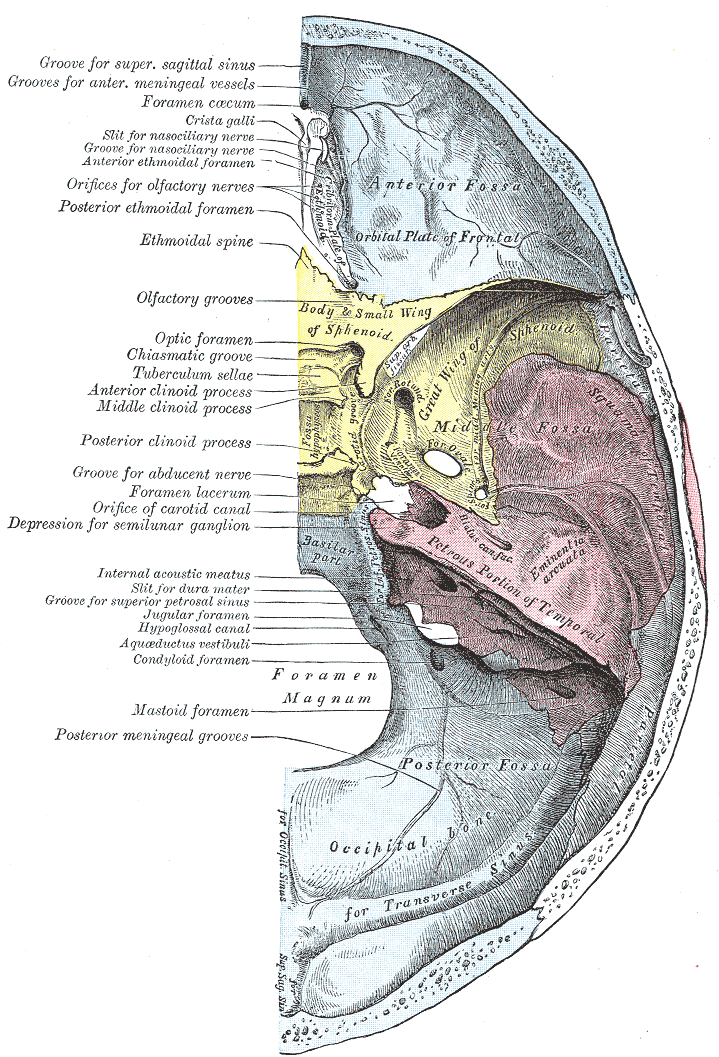
Base of the skull. Upper surface.
