= Nerve to tensor veli palatini =

Mandibular nerve

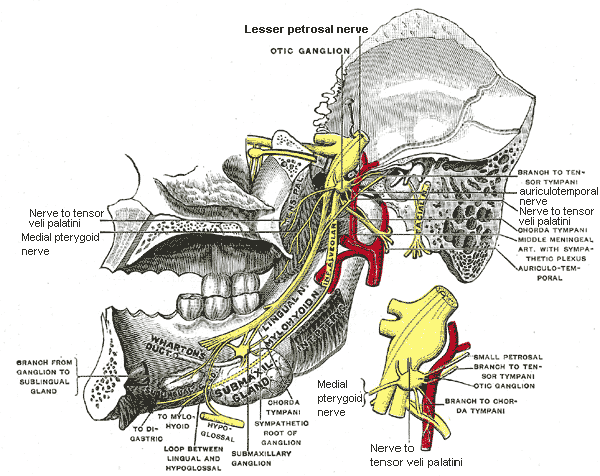
- Mandibular division of trifacial nerve, seen from the middle line.

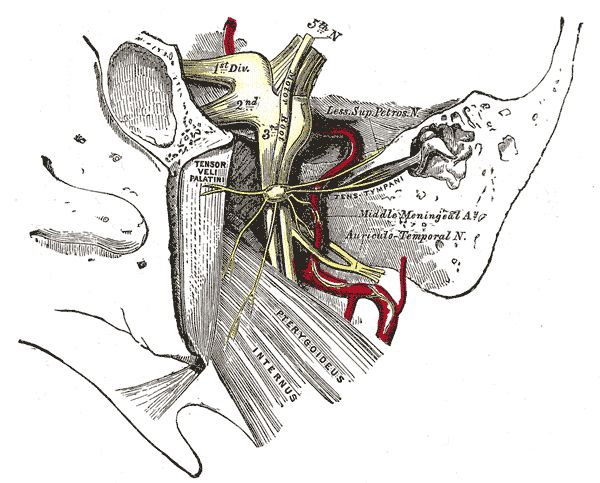
- The otic ganglion and its branches. (Tensor veli palatini visible at center left.)

Details
- From: medial pterygoid nerve
- Innervates: tensor veli palatini

Identifiers
- Latin: nervus musculi tensoris veli palatini
- TA98: A14.2.01.068
- TA2: 6251
- FMA: 53075

The nerve to tensor veli palatini is a small nerve which is unique in that it is the only branch of the mandibular nerve providing motor innervation to the palate. It causes the soft palate to block entry to the nasopharynx during swallowing.
