= Scaphoid fossa =

Depression in the sphenoid bone of the skull

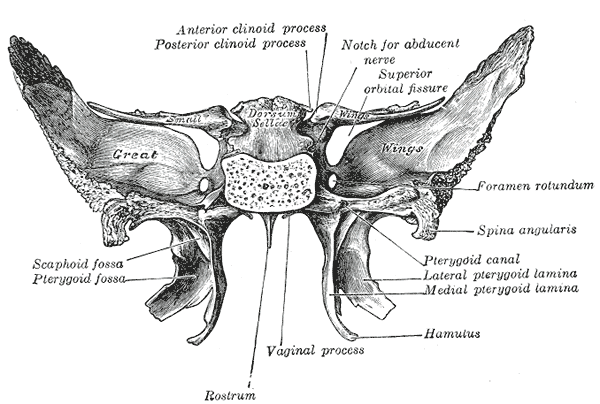
- Sphenoid bone. Upper and posterior surfaces. (Scaphoid fossa is labeled at left.)

Details

Identifiers
- Latin: fossa scaphoidea ossis sphenoidalis
- TA98: A02.1.05.047
- TA2: 633
- FMA: 84973

In the pterygoid processes of the sphenoid, above the pterygoid fossa is a small, oval, shallow depression, the scaphoid fossa, which gives origin to the tensor veli palatini.

It is not the same as and has to be distinguished from the scaphoid fossa of the external ear or pinna.
