= Sphenoid sinus =

One of the four paired paranasal sinuses

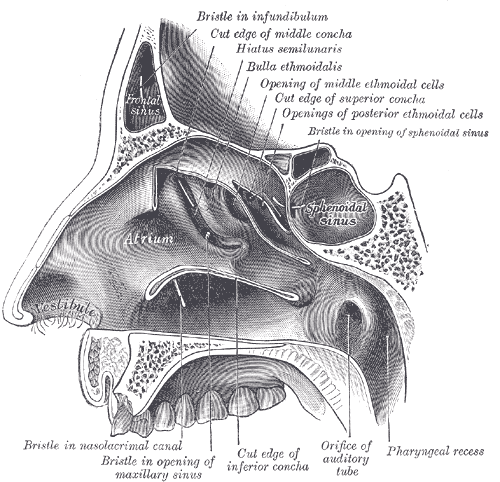
- Lateral wall of nasal cavity; the three nasal conchæ have been removed. (Sphenoidal sinus visible at upper right, in dark circle.)

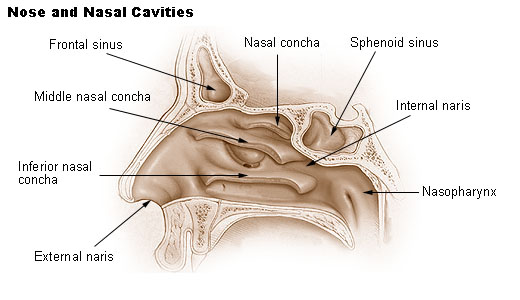
- Nose and nasal cavities. (Sphenoid sinus labeled at upper right.)

Details
- Nerve: Posterior ethmoidal nerves, and orbital branches of the pterygopalatine ganglion

Identifiers
- Latin: sinus sphenoidalis
- MeSH: D013101
- TA98: A06.1.03.003
- TA2: 3178
- FMA: 54683

The sphenoid sinus is a paired paranasal sinus in the body of the sphenoid bone. It is one pair of the four paired paranasal sinuses. The two sphenoid sinuses are separated from each other by a septum. Each sphenoid sinus communicates with the nasal cavity via the opening of sphenoidal sinus. The two sphenoid sinuses vary in size and shape, and are usually asymmetrical.

== Structure ==
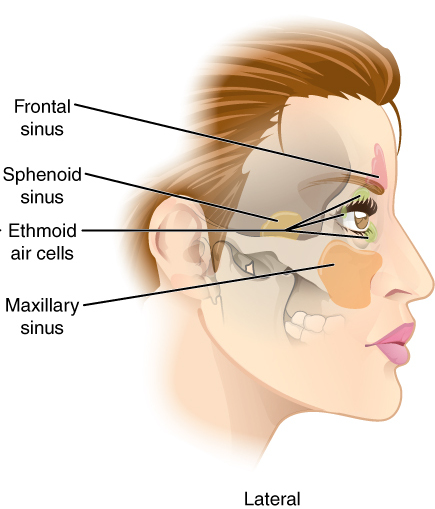
Paranasal sinuses

On average, a sphenoid sinus measures 2.2 cm vertical height, 2 cm in transverse breadth; and 2.2 cm antero-posterior depth.

Each sphenoid sinus is in the body of sphenoid bone, just under the sella turcica. The sphenoid sinuses are separated from each other medially by the septum of sphenoidal sinuses, which is usually asymmetrical.

An opening of sphenoidal sinus forms a passage between each sphenoidal sinus and the nasal cavity. Posteriorly, an opening of sphenoidal sinus opens into the sphenoidal sinus by an aperture high on the anterior wall of the sinus; anteriorly, an opening of sphenoidal sinus opens into the roof of the nasal cavity via an aperture on the posterior wall of the sphenoethmoidal recess, just over the choana.

=== Innervation ===
The mucous membrane receives sensory innervation from the posterior ethmoidal nerve (branch of the ophthalmic nerve (CN V_{1})) and from branches of the maxillary nerve (CN V_{2}).

Postganglionic parasympathetic fibers of the facial nerve that synapsed at the pterygopalatine ganglion control mucus secretion.

=== Anatomical relations ===
Nearby structures include the optic canal, the optic nerve, the internal carotid artery, the cavernous sinus, the trigeminal nerve, the pituitary gland, and the anterior ethmoidal cells. One study found that carotid canal protrudation into the sphenoid sinus wall was present in 23.9–32.1% of males and 35.5–36.2% of females, dehiscence in carotid canal was detected more in females (34%) than in males (22%), optic canal protrudation was 33.3 and 30.5% in males and females, and optic canal dehiscence was detected in 11.3% of males and 9.9% of females.

=== Anatomical variation ===
The sphenoid sinuses vary in size and shape; because of the lateral displacement of the intervening septum of sphenoid sinuses, the pair rarely is symmetrical.

When exceptionally large, the sphenoid sinuses may extend into the roots of the pterygoid processes or greater wings of sphenoid bone, and may invade the basilar part of the occipital bone.

The septum of the sphenoidal sinuses may be partly or completely absent. Other septa also may be incomplete.

=== Development ===
The sphenoidal sinuses are minute at birth; their main development takes place after puberty.

== Clinical significance ==
The sphenoid sinuses cannot be palpated on physical examination. However, patients with isolated sphenoid sinusitis may complain of occipital or vertex headache, retro-orbital pain, otalgia, drowsiness, or meningitis-like symptoms.

A potential complication of sphenoidal sinusitis is cavernous sinus thrombosis.

If a fast-growing tumor erodes the floor of the sphenoidal sinus, the vidian nerve may be in danger. If the tumor spreads laterally, the cavernous sinus and all its constituent nerves may be in danger.

Sphenoidotomy, a form of endonasal surgery, may be done to enlarge the sphenoid sinus, usually in order to drain it.

The sphenoid sinus should be distinguished from an Onodi cell, an anatomic variant that is the rearmost ethmoidal air cell. Onodi cells typically extend back to lie superolateral to the sphenoid sinus and thus near the optic nerve and internal carotid artery. Failure to recognize an Onodi cell on CT scan before surgery may put these structures at risk. One study found that an Onodi cell was present in 26.6% of males and 19.1% of females.

=== Transsphenoidal surgery ===
Because only thin shelves of bone separate the sphenoidal sinuses from the nasal cavities, below, and from the hypophyseal fossa, above, the pituitary gland can be reached surgically through the roof of the nasal cavities by passage through the anterioinferior aspect of the sphenoid bone and into the sinuses, followed by entry through the top of the sphenoid bone into the hypophyseal fossa.
