= Pterygoalar ligament =

Ligament of the skull

- From: Lateral pterygoid lamina
- To: Greater wing of the sphenoid

The pterygoalar ligament extends from the lamina of the lateral pterygoid to the undersurface of the greater wing of the sphenoid bone.

== See also ==
- Pterygospinous ligament
