= Body of sphenoid bone =

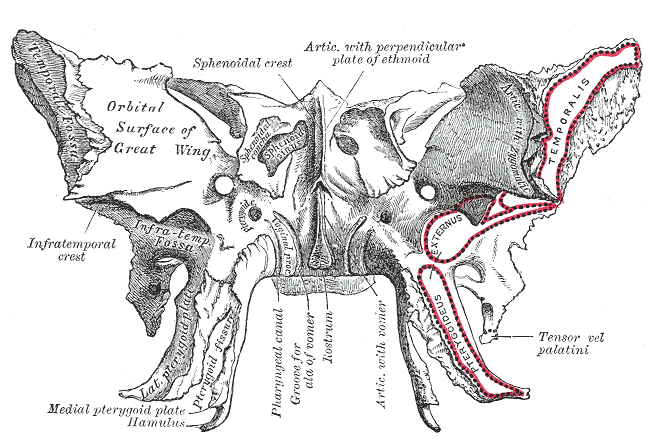
- Figure 2: Sphenoid bone, anterior and inferior surfaces.

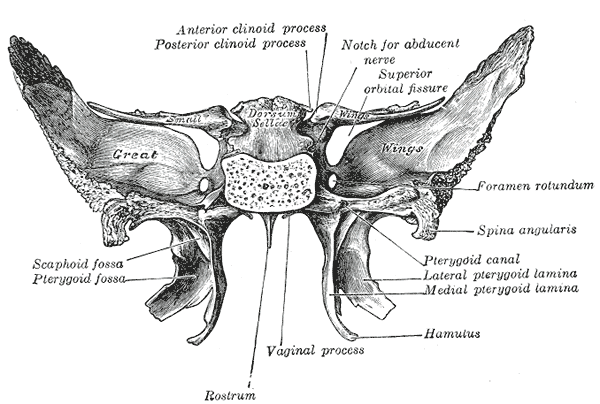
- Figure 3: Sphenoid bone, upper and posterior surfaces.

Details

Identifiers
- Latin: corpus ossis sphenoidalis
- TA98: A02.1.05.002
- TA2: 585
- FMA: 52867

The body of the sphenoid bone, more or less cubical in shape, is hollowed out in its interior to form two large cavities, the sphenoidal sinuses, which are separated from each other by a septum.

== Superior surface ==
The superior surface of the body [Fig. 1] presents in front a prominent spine, the ethmoidal spine, for articulation with the cribriform plate of the ethmoid bone; behind this is a smooth surface slightly raised in the middle line, and grooved on either side for the olfactory lobes of the brain.

This surface is bounded behind by a ridge, which forms the anterior border of a narrow, transverse groove, the prechiasmatic groove, above and behind which lies the optic chiasma; the groove ends on either side in the optic foramen, which transmits the optic nerve and ophthalmic artery into the orbital cavity.

Behind the chiasmatic groove is an elevation, the tuberculum sellae; and behind this is a deep depression, the saddle-shaped sella turcica (Turkish seat), the deepest part of which, the hypophyseal fossa, lodges the pituitary gland.

The anterior boundary of the sella turcica is completed by two small eminences, one on either side, called the middle clinoid processes, while the posterior boundary is formed by a square-shaped plate of bone, the dorsum sellae, ending at its superior angles in two tubercles, the posterior clinoid processes, the size and form of which vary considerably in different individuals.

The posterior clinoid processes deepen the sella turcica, and give attachment to the tentorium cerebelli.

On either side of the dorsum sellae is a notch for the passage of the abducent nerve, and below the notch a sharp process, the petrosal process, which articulates with the apex of the petrous portion of the temporal bone, and forms the medial boundary of the foramen lacerum.

Behind the dorsum sellae is a shallow depression, the clivus, which slopes obliquely backward, and is continuous with the groove on the basilar portion of the occipital bone; it supports the upper part of the pons.

=== Lateral surfaces ===
The lateral surfaces of the body are united with the greater wings of the sphenoid and the medial pterygoid plates.

Above the attachment of each greater wing is a broad groove, curved something like the italic letter f; it lodges the internal carotid artery and the cavernous sinus, and is named the carotid sulcus.

Along the posterior part of the lateral margin of this groove, in the angle between the body and greater wing, is a ridge of bone, called the sphenoidal lingula.

=== Posterior surfaces ===
The posterior surface, quadrilateral in form [Fig. 3], is joined, during infancy and adolescence, to the basilar part of the occipital bone by a plate of cartilage.

Between the eighteenth and twenty-fifth years this becomes ossified, ossification commencing above and extending downward.

=== Anterior surface ===
The anterior surface of the body [Fig. 2] presents, in the middle line, a vertical crest, the sphenoidal crest, which articulates with the perpendicular plate of the ethmoid, and forms part of the nasal septum.

On either side of the crest is an irregular opening leading into the corresponding sphenoidal air sinus.

These sinuses are two large, irregular cavities hollowed out of the interior of the body of the bone, and separated from one another by a bony septum, which is commonly bent to one or the other side.

They vary considerably in form and size, are seldom symmetrical, and are often partially subdivided by irregular bony laminae.

Occasionally, they extend into the basilar part of the occipital bone nearly as far as the foramen magnum. They begin to be developed before birth, and are of a considerable size by the age of six.

They are partially closed, in front and below, by two thin, curved plates of bone, the sphenoidal conchae, leaving in the articulated skull a round opening at the upper part of each sinus by which it communicates with the upper and back part of the nasal cavity and occasionally with the posterior ethmoidal air cells.

The lateral margin of the anterior surface is serrated, and articulates with the lamina papyracea of the ethmoid, completing the posterior ethmoidal cells; the lower margin articulates with the orbital process of the palatine bone, and the upper with the orbital plate of the frontal bone.

=== Inferior surface ===
The inferior surface presents, in the middle line, a triangular spine, the sphenoidal rostrum, which is continuous with the sphenoidal crest on the anterior surface, and is received in a deep fissure between the alæ of the vomer.

On either side of the rostrum is a projecting lamina, the vaginal process, directed medialward from the base of the medial pterygoid plate, with which it will be described.

== Additional images ==
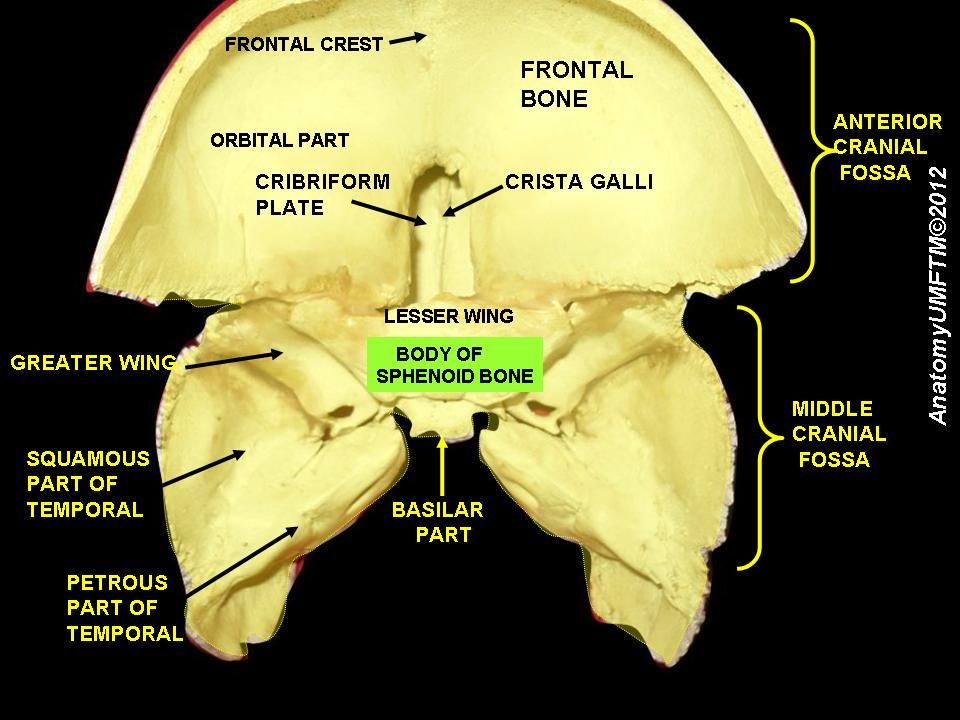
Body of sphenoid bone

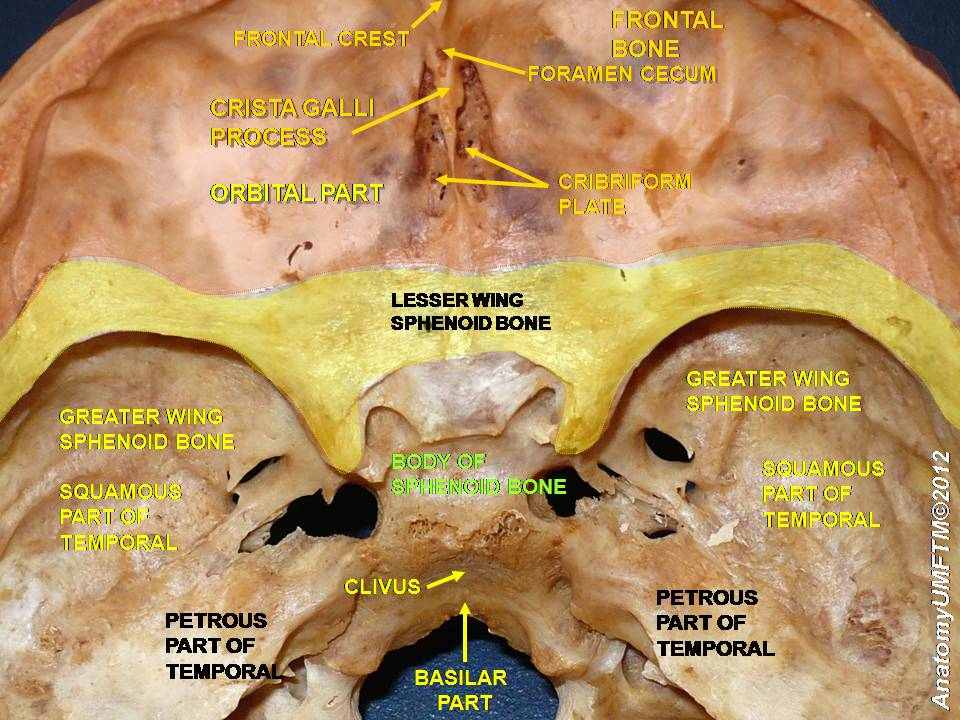
Body of sphenoid bone

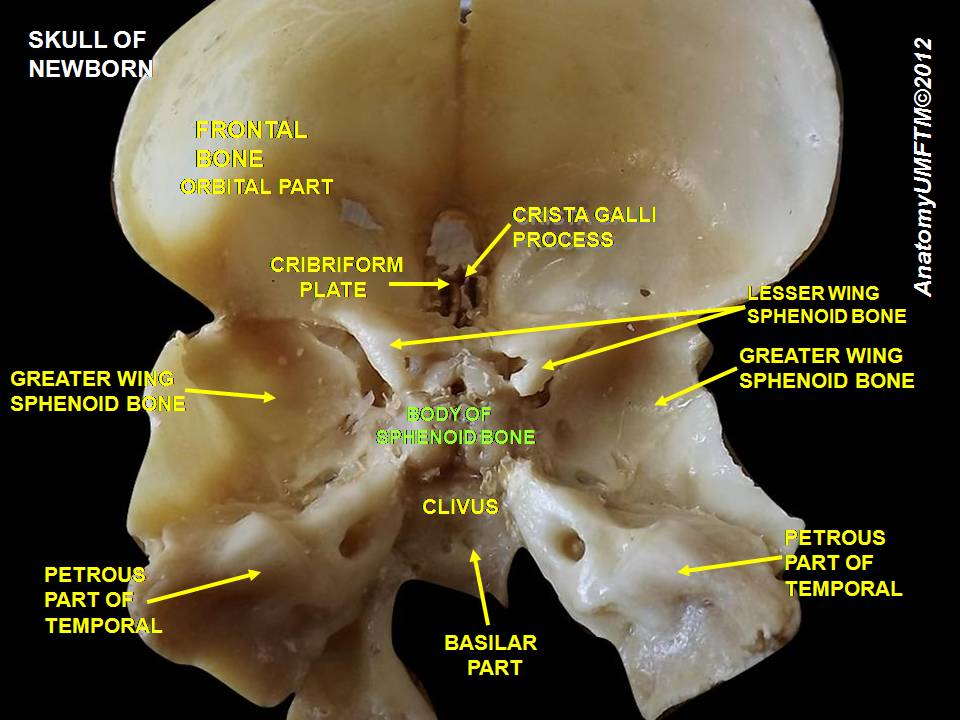
Body of sphenoid bone
