= Pterygospinous ligament =

Ligament within the head

Details
- From: Sphenoid bone
- To: Lateral pterygoid plate

Identifiers
- Latin: ligamentum pterygospinale
- TA98: A03.1.01.002
- TA2: 1566
- FMA: 72307

The pterygospinous ligament stretches from the upper part of the posterior border of the lateral pterygoid plate to the spinous process of the sphenoid.

== Structure ==
=== Variation ===
It occasionally ossifies, and in such cases, between its upper border and the base of the skull, a foramen is formed - pterygospinous foramen (Civinini) which transmits the branches of the mandibular nerve to the muscles of mastication.

== See also ==
- Pterygoalar ligament
