= Pyramidal process of palatine bone =

Bone projection of the skull

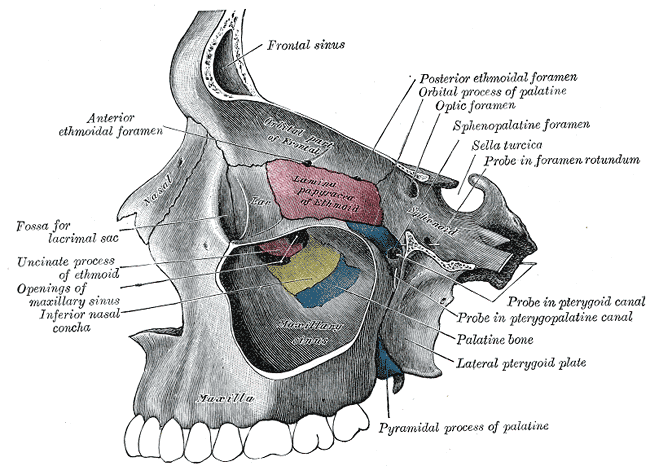
- Medial wall of left orbit. (Pyramidal process of palatine labeled at bottom right.)

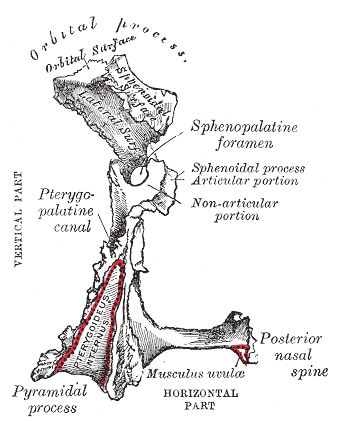
- Left palatine bone. Posterior aspect. Enlarged. (Pyramidal process labeled at bottom left.)

Details

Identifiers
- Latin: processus pyramidalis ossis palatini
- TA98: A02.1.13.007
- TA2: 804
- FMA: 52900

The pyramidal process of the palatine bone projects backward and lateralward from the junction of the horizontal and vertical parts, and is received into the angular interval between the lower extremities of the pterygoid plates.

On its posterior surface is a smooth, grooved, triangular area, limited on either side by a rough articular furrow. The furrows articulate with the pterygoid plates, while the grooved intermediate area completes the lower part of the pterygoid fossa and gives origin to a few fibers of the Pterygoideus internus.

The anterior part of the lateral surface is rough, for articulation with the tuberosity of the maxilla; its posterior part consists of a smooth triangular area which appears, in the articulated skull, between the tuberosity of the maxilla and the lower part of the lateral pterygoid plate, and completes the lower part of the infratemporal fossa.

On the base of the pyramidal process, close to its union with the horizontal part, are the lesser palatine foramina for the transmission of the posterior and middle palatine nerves.

== Additional images ==
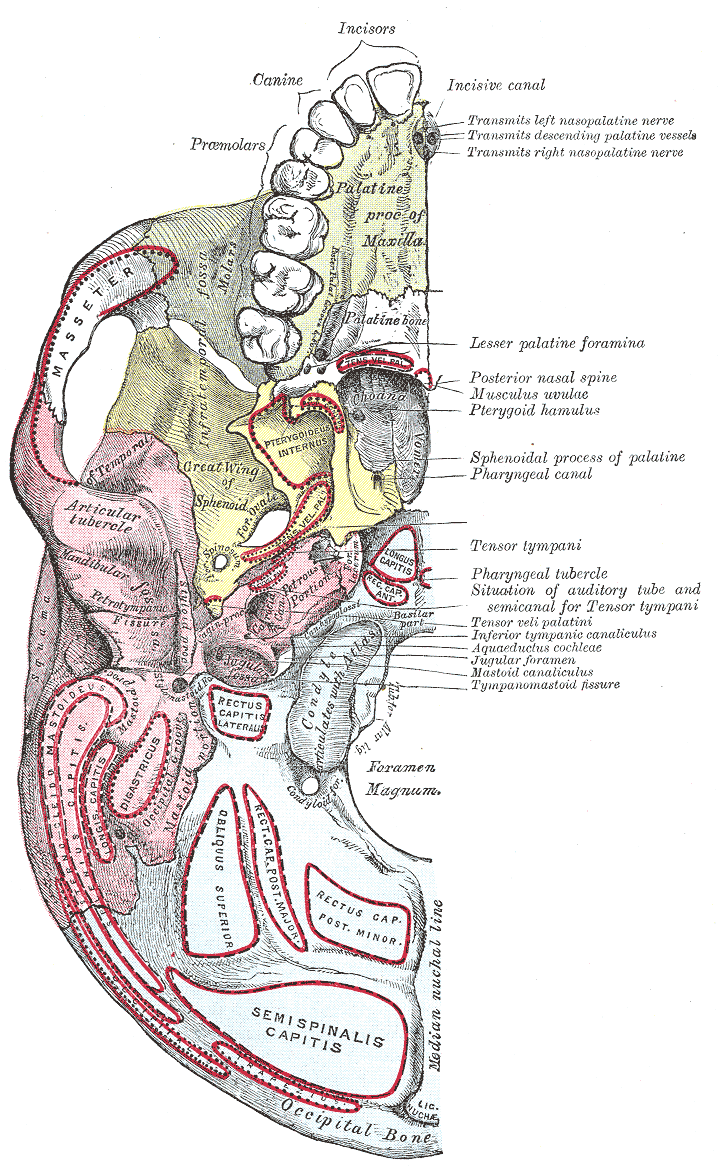
Base of skull. Inferior surface.
