= Medial pterygoid nerve =

Nerve of the head

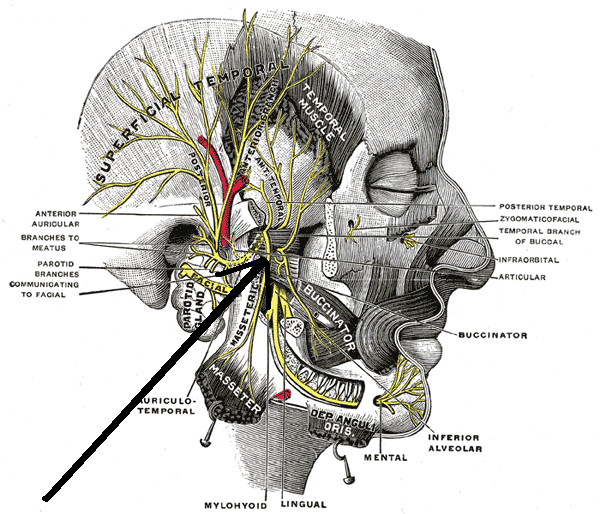
- Mandibular division of the trigeminus nerve. (Internal pterygoid nerve visible but not labeled.)

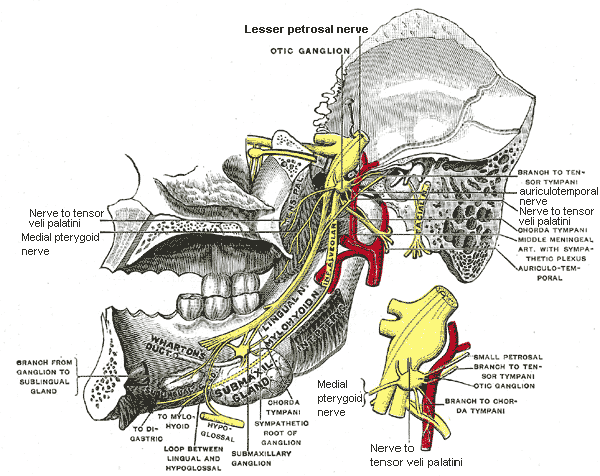
- Mandibular division of trifacial nerve, seen from the middle line. Nerve to medial pterygoid labeled at bottom.

Details
- From: Mandibular nerve
- Innervates: Medial pterygoid, tensor veli palatini, tensor tympani

Identifiers
- Latin: nervus pterygoideus internus, nervus pterygoideus medialis
- TA98: A14.2.01.066
- TA2: 6250
- FMA: 53056

The medial pterygoid nerve (nerve to medial pterygoid, or internal pterygoid nerve) is a nerve of the head. It is a branch of the mandibular nerve (CN V_{3}). It supplies the medial pterygoid muscle, the tensor veli palatini muscle, and the tensor tympani muscle.

== Structure ==
=== Origin ===
The medial pterygoid nerve is a slender branch of the mandibular nerve (CN V_{3}) (itself a branch of the trigeminal nerve (CN V)).

=== Course ===
It passes through the otic ganglion (without synapsing). It penetrates the deep surface of the medial pterygoid muscle. It issues 1-2 twigs which traverse the otic ganglion (without synapsing) to reach and innervate the tensor tympani muscle, and tensor veli palatini muscle.

=== Distribution ===
The medial pterygoid nerve supplies the medial pterygoid muscle, tensor tympani muscle, and tensor veli palatini muscle (via the nerve to tensor veli palatini).

The tensor veli palati muscle is the only of the five paired skeletal muscles to the soft palate not innervated by the pharyngeal plexus.
