= Sphenoid bone =

Bone of the neurocranium

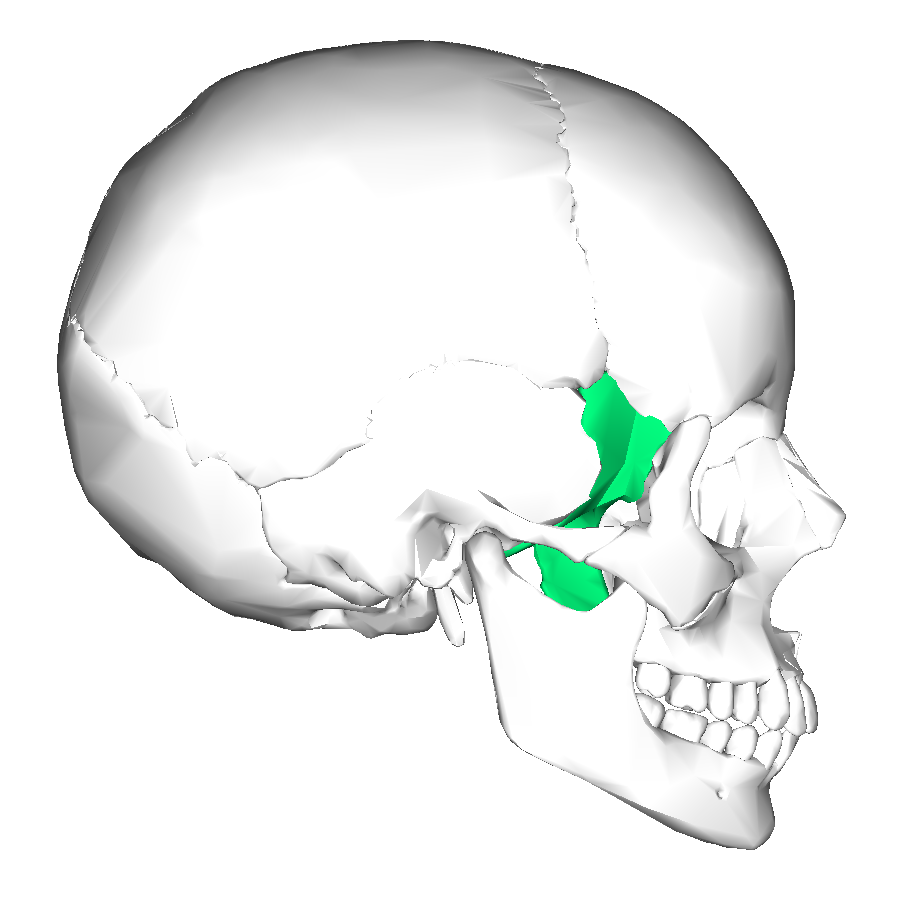
- Position of the sphenoid bone

- Animation of the sphenoid bone

Details

Identifiers
- Latin: os sphenoidale
- MeSH: D013100
- TA98: A02.1.05.001
- TA2: 584
- FMA: 52736

The sphenoid bone (Note: According to most dictionaries, the word sphenoid (/ˈsfiːnɔɪd/) derives from Greek sphenoeides, "wedgelike". Thieme Atlas of Anatomy disagrees and says that the sphenoid bone was originally called os sphecoidale, meaning "bone resembling a wasp", and that the word was later written 'sphenoidale' by a transcription error. As an anterior view of the bone resembles more the body of a wasp or a bat with wings than a wedge.) is an unpaired bone of the neurocranium in mammals. It is situated in the middle of the skull towards the front, in front of the basilar part of the occipital bone. The sphenoid bone is one of the seven bones that articulate to form the orbit. The name originates from the Ancient Greek word sphekodes (σφηκώδης), meaning 'wasp-like', presumably referring to the bone's winged appearance.

== Structure ==
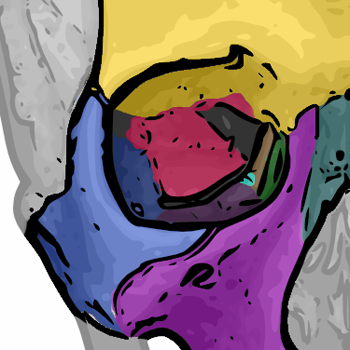
Seven bones articulate to form the orbit. The sphenoid bone is in red (directly in the middle of the orbital cavity).

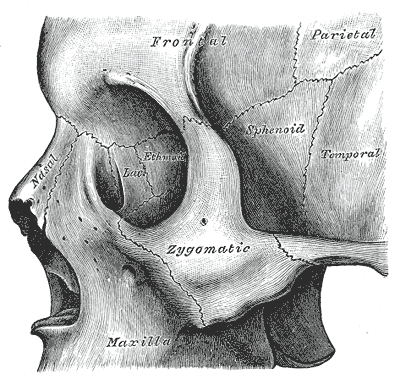
Wedge-shaped sphenoid bone seen laterally

It is divided into the following parts:

- A median portion, known as the body of sphenoid bone, containing the sella turcica, which houses the pituitary gland as well as the paired paranasal sinuses, the sphenoidal sinuses
- Two greater wings on the lateral side of the body and two lesser wings from the anterior side.
- Pterygoid processes of the sphenoid, directed downwards from the junction of the body and the greater wings.

Two sphenoidal conchae are situated at the anterior and inferior part of the body.

=== Intrinsic ligaments of the sphenoid ===
The more important of these are:

- The pterygospinous, which stretches between the spina angularis and the lateral pterygoid plate, superiorly attached to the root of the lateral pterygoid plate anteriorly;
- The interclinoid ligament, a band of dura mater that connects the anterior clinoid process and posterior clinoid process of the sphenoid bone;
- The caroticoclinoid, connecting the anterior to the middle clinoid process.

These ligaments occasionally ossify, though the incidence of ligamentous ossification (both partial and complete) varies according to the ligament type, with the interclinoid ligament being most commonly identified as having ossified and the pterygoalar ligament least commonly identified.

=== Features ===
- Pterygoid notch
- Pterygoid fossa
- Scaphoid fossa
- Pterygoid hamulus
- Pterygoid canal
- Pterygospinous process
- Sella turcica

=== Articulations ===
The sphenoid articulates with the frontal, parietal, ethmoid, temporal, zygomatic, palatine, vomer, and occipital bones and helps to connect the neurocranium to the facial skeleton.

== Body of sphenoid ==
=== Superior or cerebral surface ===
Articulates with ethmoid bone anteriorly and basilar part of occipital bone posteriorly. It shows:

1. Jugum sphenoidale
2. Sulcus chiasmaticus
3. Tuberculum sellae
4. Sella turcica
5. Dorsum sellae
6. Clivus

=== Inferior surface ===
1. Rostrum of sphenoid
2. Sphenoidal conchae
3. Vaginal processes of medial pterygoid plate

=== Anterior surface ===
Sphenoidal crest articulates with the perpendicular plate of the ethmoid, leading to the formation of a part of the septum of nose.

=== Posterior surface ===
Basilar part of occipital bone

=== Lateral surface ===
Carotid sulcus lodging cavernous sinus and internal carotid artery

== Sphenoidal sinuses ==
Sphenoidal or sphenoid sinuses are asymmetrical air sinuses in the body of the sphenoid, closed by sphenoidal conchae.

== Greater wings ==
=== Superior or cerebral surface ===
This forms the floor of the middle cranial fossa. It presents (starting from the front):

- Foramen rotundum
- Foramen ovale
- Sphenoidal emissary foramen
- Foramen spinosum

=== Lateral surface ===
This is divided into (by infratemporal crest):

- Upper or temporal surface
- Lower or infratemporal surface

The following foramina pierce it:

- Foramen ovale
- Foramen spinosum

=== Orbital surface ===
This forms the posterior wall of the orbit

== Lesser wings ==
These are two triangular wings projecting laterally from the anterosuperior part of the body. Each consists of:

- A base forming medial end of the wing.
- Tip forming the lateral end of the wing.
- Superior surface forming the floor of anterior cranial fossa.
- Inferior surface forming upper boundary of superior orbital fissure.
- Posterior surface projects into the Sylvian point.
- Medially, terminates in the anterior clinoid process.

=== Development ===
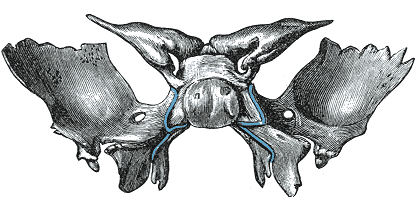
Figure 4: Sphenoid bone at birth, posterior aspect

Until the seventh or eighth month of fetal development, the body of the sphenoid consists of two parts: one in front of the tuberculum sellae, the presphenoid, with which the small wings are continuous; the other, consisting of the sella turcica and dorsum sellae, the postsphenoid, with which are associated the great wings, and pterygoid processes.

The greater part of the bone is ossified in cartilage. There are fourteen centers in all, six for the presphenoid and eight for the postsphenoid.

==== Presphenoid ====
By about the ninth week of fetal development an ossific center appears for each of the small wings (orbito-sphenoids) just lateral to the optic foramen; this is followed by the appearance of two nuclei in the presphenoid part of the body.

The sphenoidal conchae are each developed from a center that makes its appearance about the fifth month; at birth they consist of small triangular laminae, and it is not until the third year that they become hollowed out and coneshaped; about the fourth year they fuse with the labyrinths of the ethmoid bone, and between the ninth and twelfth years they unite with the sphenoid bone.

==== Postsphenoid ====
The first ossific nuclei are those for the great wings (alisphenoids). One makes its appearance in each wing between the foramen rotundum and foramen ovale about the eighth week. The orbital plate and that part of the sphenoid, which is found in the temporal fossa, as well as the lateral pterygoid plate, are ossified in membrane (Fawcett).

Soon after, the centers for the postsphenoid part of the body appear, one on either side of the sella turcica, and become blended together about the middle of fetal life.

Each medial pterygoid plate (except its hamulus) is ossified in membrane, and its center probably appears about the ninth or tenth week; the hamulus becomes chondrified during the third month, and almost at once ossifies (Fawcett).

The medial joins the lateral pterygoid plate about the sixth month.

About the fourth month, a center appears for each lingula and speedily joins the rest of the bone.

The presphenoid is united to the postsphenoid about the eighth month, and at birth the sphenoid is in three pieces [Fig. 4]: a central one, consisting of the body and small wings, and two lateral, each comprising a great wing and pterygoid process.

In the first year after birth the great wings and body unite, and the small wings extend inward above the anterior part of the body and, meeting with each other in the middle line, form an elevated smooth surface, termed the jugum sphenoidale.

By the twenty-fifth year the sphenoid and occipital are completely fused.

Between the pre- and postsphenoid there are occasionally seen the remains of a canal, the canalis cranio-pharyngeus, through which, in early fetal life, the hypophyseal diverticulum of the buccal ectoderm is transmitted.

The sphenoidal sinuses are present as minute cavities at the time of birth (Onodi), but do not attain their full size until after puberty.

== Function ==
This bone assists with the formation of the base and the sides of the skull and the floors and walls of the orbits. It is the site of attachment for most of the muscles of mastication. Many foramina and fissures are located in the sphenoid that carry nerves and blood vessels of the head and neck, such as the superior orbital fissure (with ophthalmic nerve), foramen rotundum (with maxillary nerve) and foramen ovale (with mandibular nerve).

== Other animals ==
The sphenoid bone of humans is homologous with a number of bones that are often separate in other animals, and have a somewhat complex arrangement.

In the early lobe-finned fishes and tetrapods, the pterygoid bones were flat, ribbon-like bones forming the major part of the roof of the mouth. Above the pterygoids were the epipterygoid bones, which formed part of a flexible joint between the braincase and the palatal region, as well as extending a vertical bar of bone towards the roof of the skull. The basisphenoid bone formed part of the floor of the braincase. Above them, the orbitosphenoid forms the interorbital wall.

Aside from the loss of the flexible joint at the rear of the palate, this primitive pattern is broadly retained in reptiles, albeit with some individual modifications. In birds, the epipterygoids are absent. Living amphibians have a relatively simplified skull in this region; a broad parasphenoid forms the floor of the braincase, the pterygoids are relatively small, and all other related bones except the sphenethmoid are absent.

In mammals, these various bones are often (though not always) fused into a single structure, the sphenoid. The basisphenoid forms the posterior part of the base, while the pterygoid processes represent the pterygoid bones. The epipterygoids have extended into the wall of the cranium; they are referred to as alisphenoids when separate in mammals and form the greater wings of the sphenoid when fused into a larger structure. The orbitosphenoids bone forms the lesser wings and a new separate bone, the presphenoid, forms the anterior part of the base.

In the dog, the sphenoid is represented by eight bones: basisphenoid, alisphenoids, presphenoid, orbitosphenoids, and pterygoids. These bones remain separate and are the:

- 2 Alisphenoids: each greater wing
- 2 Orbitosphenoids: each lesser wing
- Basisphenoid: back part of body
- Presphenoid: front part of body
- 2 Pterygoids: medial pterygoid plate

== Additional images ==
Position of sphenoid bone (shown in green). Animation.

Seen from below (mandible is removed)

Seen from above (parietal bones are removed)

Shape of sphenoid bone

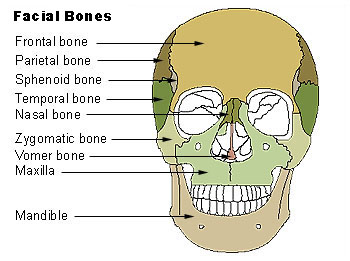
Facial bones

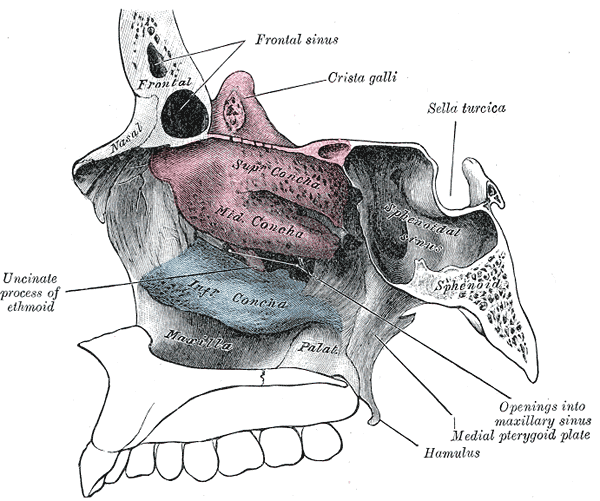
Lateral wall of nasal cavity, showing ethmoid bone in position

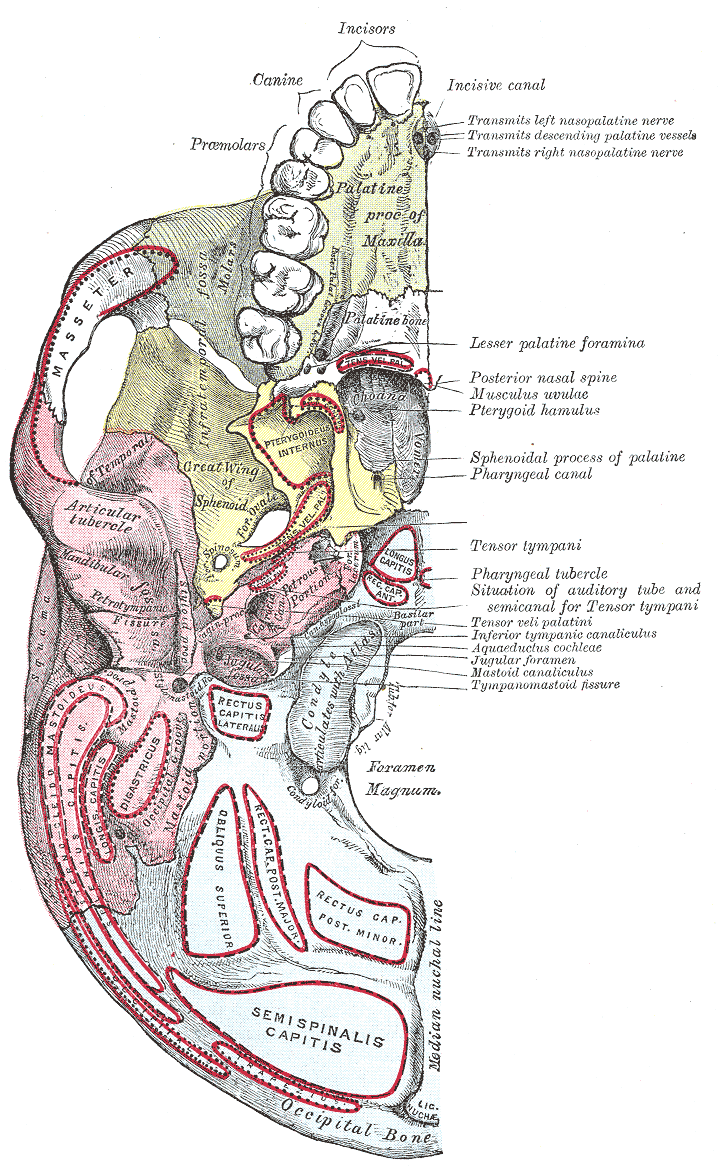
Base of skull. Inferior surface.

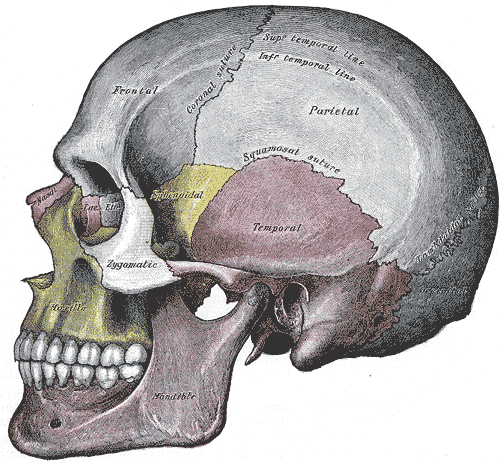
Lateral view of the skull

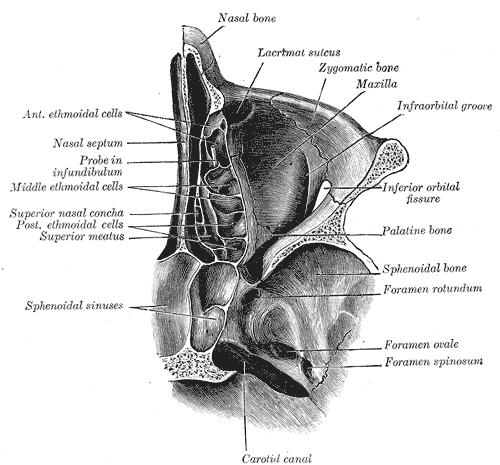
Horizontal section of nasal and orbital cavities

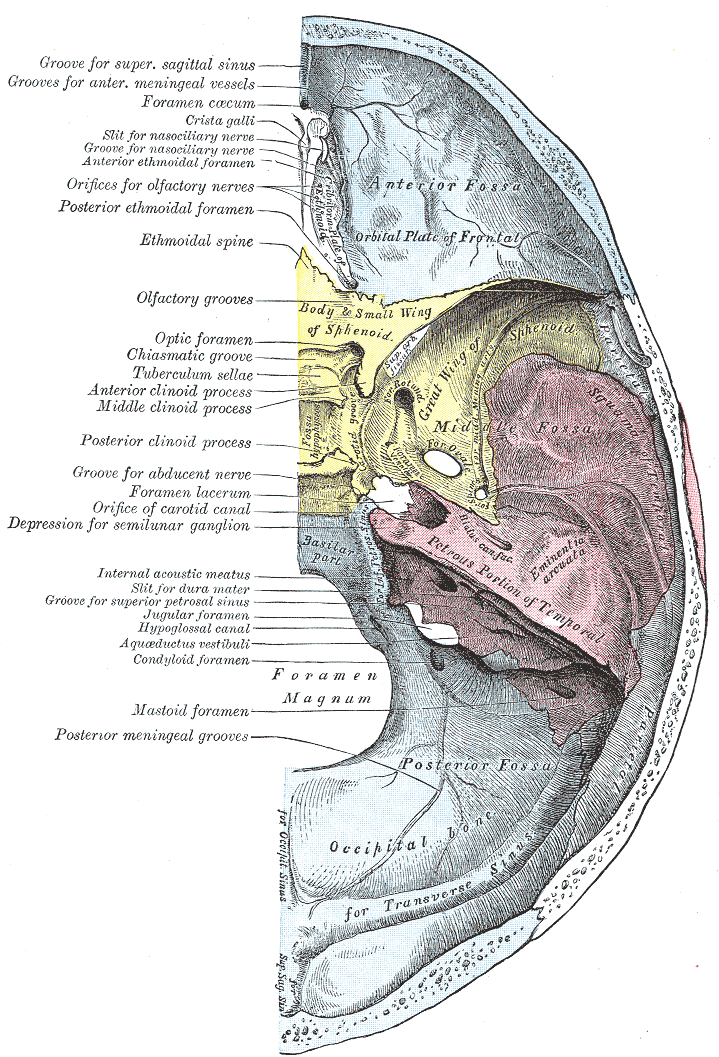
Floor of the skull

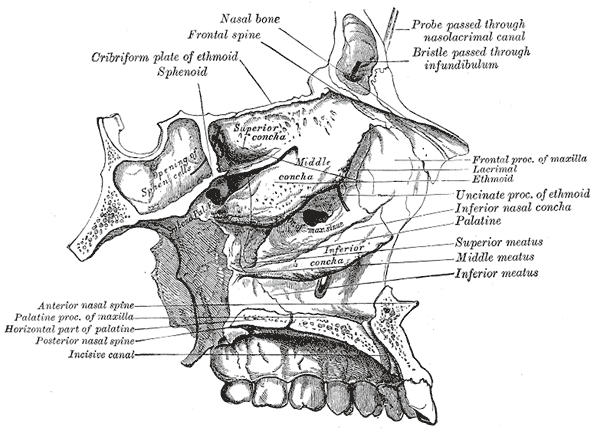
Roof, floor, and lateral wall of left nasal cavity

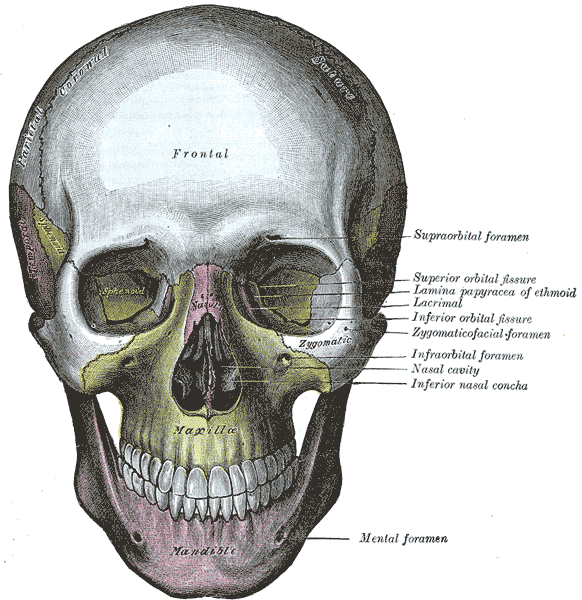
The skull from the front. The sphenoid is labeled with yellow to the left of the picture, both in the orbit and behind the zygomatic process.

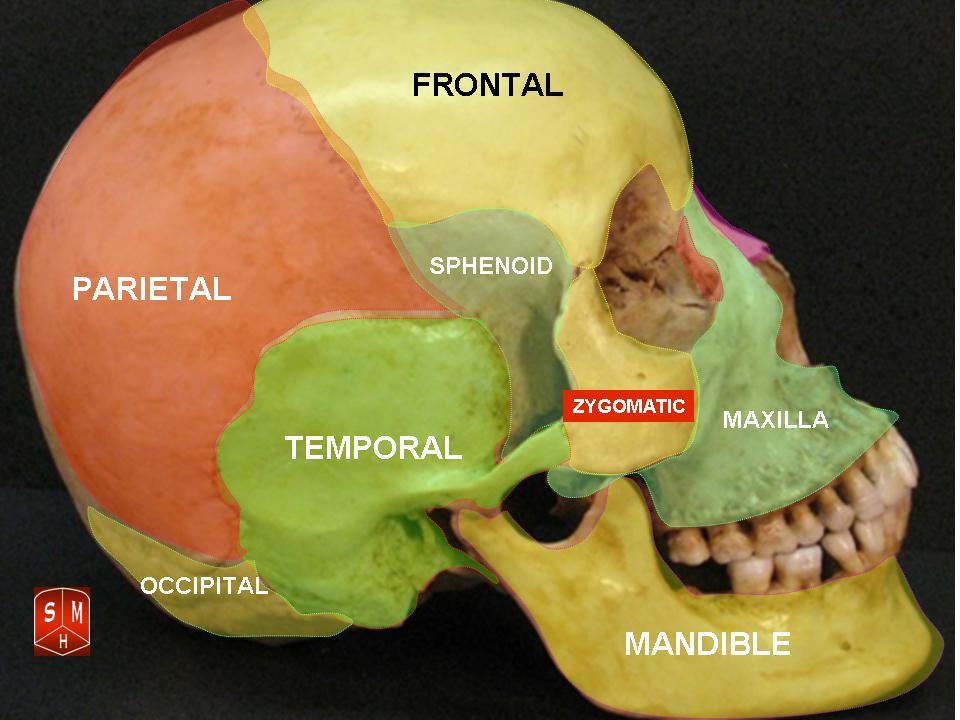
Sphenoid bone

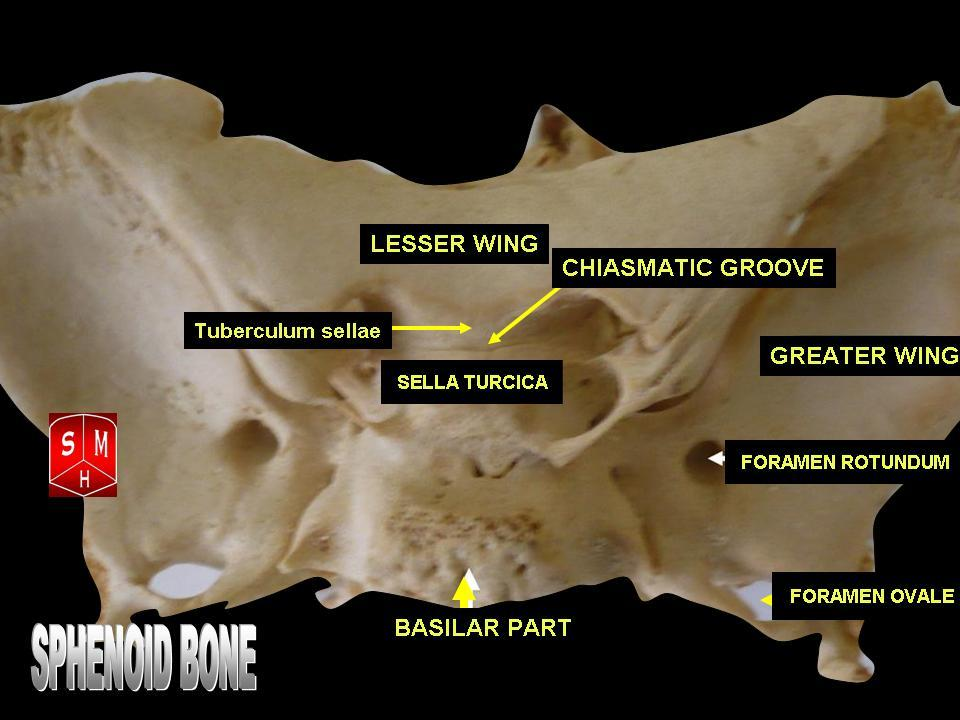
Sphenoid bone superior view

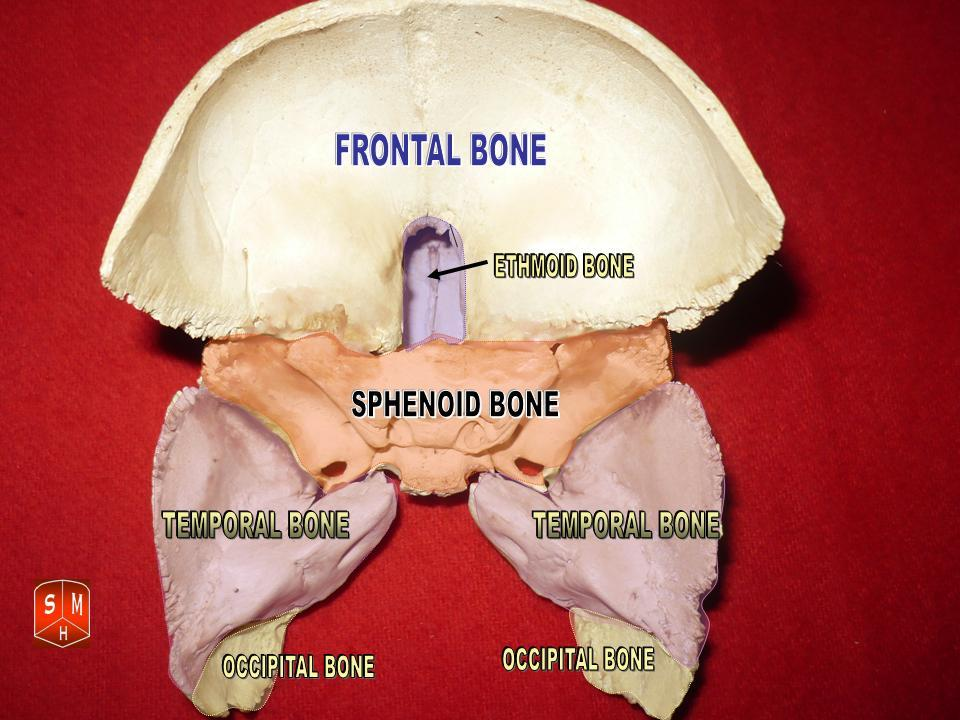
Sphenoid bone and temporal bones

== See also ==
- Sphenoidal sinus
- Pterygospinal ligament
- Basilar skull fracture
