= Medial pterygoid muscle =

Muscle involved in chewing

Medial pterygoid
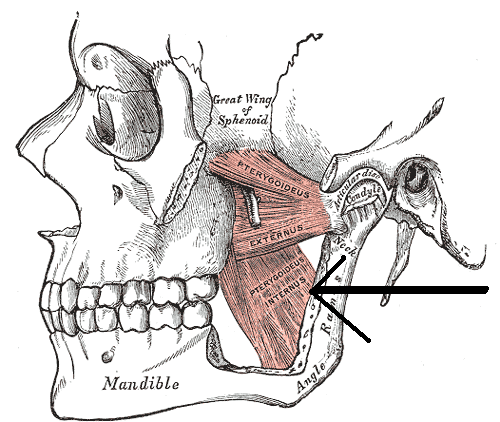
- The pterygoidei; the zygomatic arch and a portion of the ramus of the mandible have been removed. (Internus is visible at center bottom.)

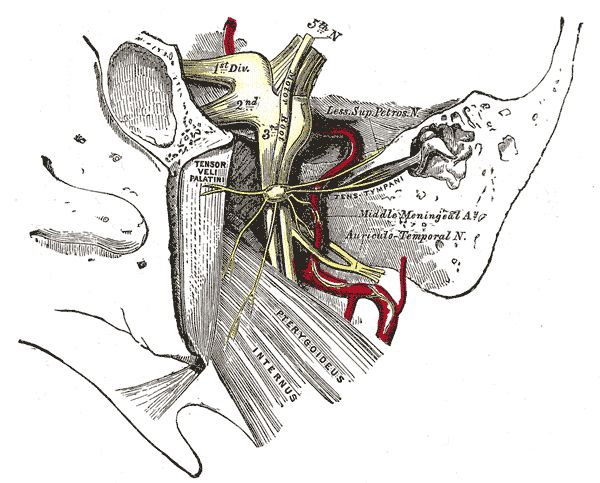
- The otic ganglion and its branches. (Pterygoideus internus labeled at bottom right.)

Details
- Origin: Deep head: medial side of lateral pterygoid plate behind the upper teeth Superficial head: pyramidal process of palatine bone and maxillary tuberosity
- Insertion: Medial angle of the mandible
- Artery: Pterygoid branches of maxillary artery
- Nerve: Mandibular nerve via nerve to medial pterygoid
- Actions: Elevates mandible, closes jaw, helps lateral pterygoids in moving the jaw from side to side

Identifiers
- Latin: musculus pterygoideus medialis, musculus pterygoideus internus
- TA98: A04.1.04.009
- TA2: 2113
- FMA: 49011

The medial pterygoid muscle (or internal pterygoid muscle) is a thick, quadrilateral muscle of the face. It is supplied by the mandibular branch of the trigeminal nerve (V). It is important in mastication (chewing).

== Structure ==
The medial pterygoid muscle consists of two heads. The bulk of the muscle arises as a deep head from just above the medial surface of the lateral pterygoid plate. The smaller, superficial head originates from the maxillary tuberosity and the pyramidal process of the palatine bone.

Its fibers pass downward, lateral, and posterior, and are inserted, by a strong tendinous lamina, into the lower and back part of the medial surface of the ramus and angle of the mandible, as high as the mandibular foramen. The insertion joins the masseter muscle to form a common tendinous sling which allows the medial pterygoid and masseter to be powerful elevators of the jaw.

=== Nerve supply ===
The medial pterygoid muscle is supplied by the medial pterygoid nerve, a branch of the mandibular nerve, itself a branch of the trigeminal nerve (V). This also supplies the tensor tympani muscle and the tensor veli palatini muscle. The medial pterygoid nerve is a main trunk from the mandibular nerve, before the division of the trigeminal nerve - this is unlike the lateral pterygoid muscle, and all other muscles of mastication which are supplied by the anterior division of the mandibular nerve.

== Function ==
The medial pterygoid muscle has functions including elevating the mandible (closing the mouth), protruding the mandible, mastication (especially for when the maxillary teeth and the mandibular teeth are close together), and excursing the mandible (contralateral excursion occurs with unilateral contraction).

== Additional images ==
Position of medial pterygoid muscle (red).

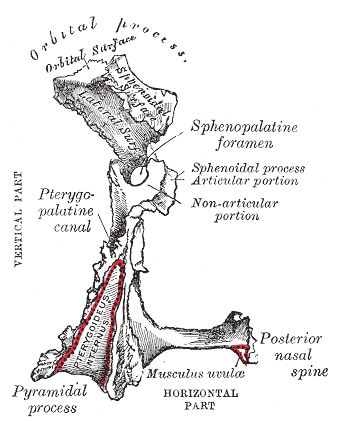
Left palatine bone. Posterior aspect. Enlarged.

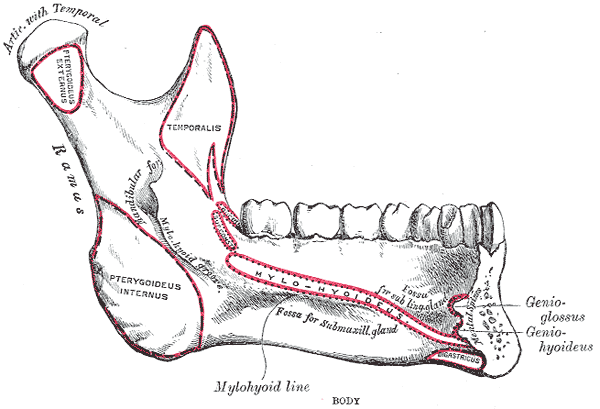
Mandible. Inner surface. Side view.

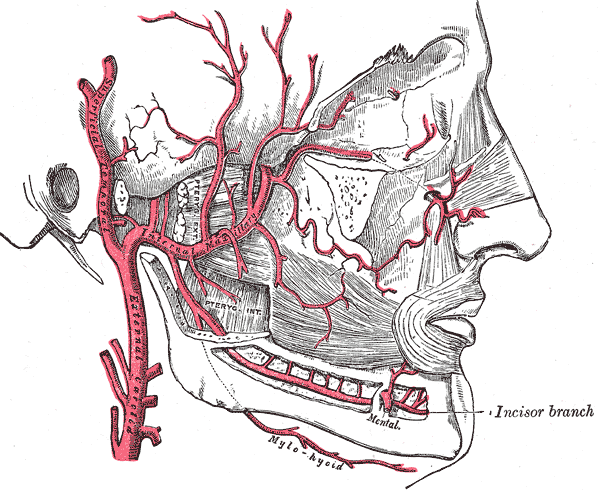
Plan of branches of internal maxillary artery.

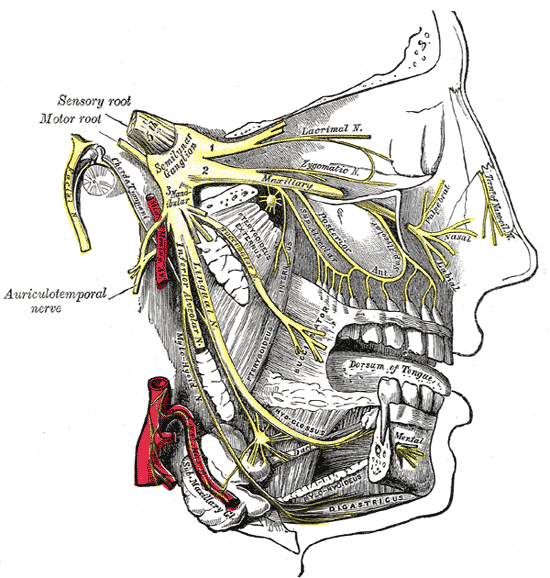
Distribution of the maxillary and mandibular nerves, and the submaxillary ganglion.

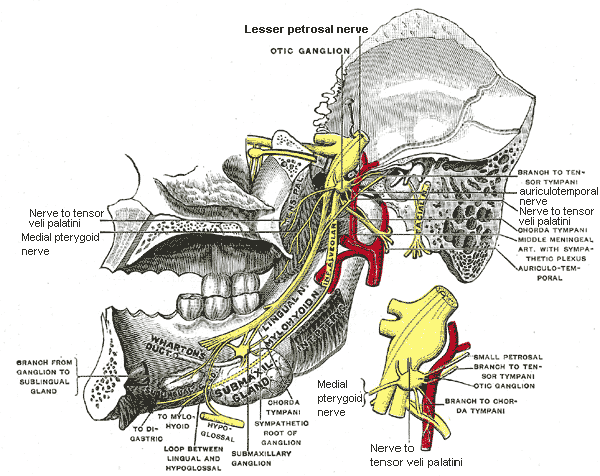
Mandibular division of trifacial nerve, seen from the middle line.

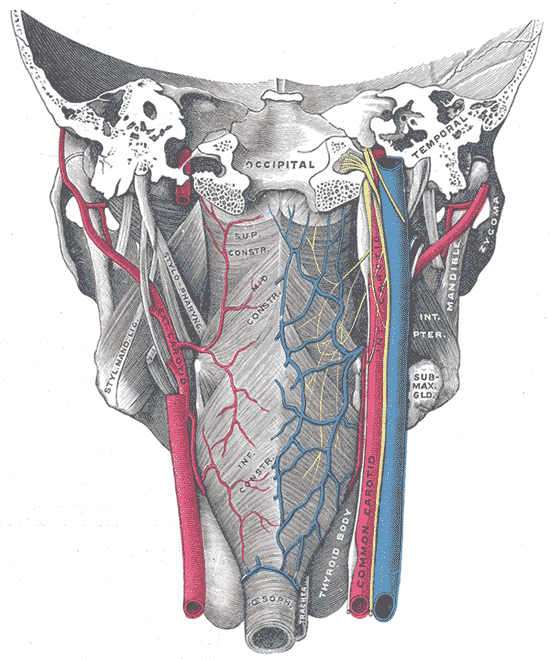
Muscles of the pharynx, viewed from behind, together with the associated vessels and nerves.

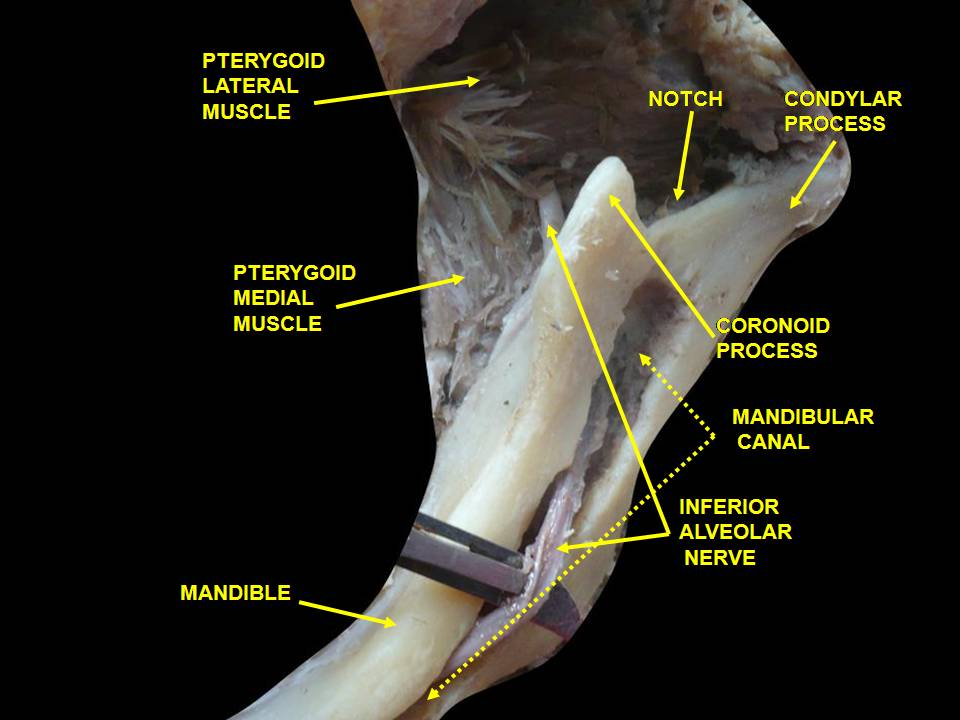
Deep dissection. Anterior view.
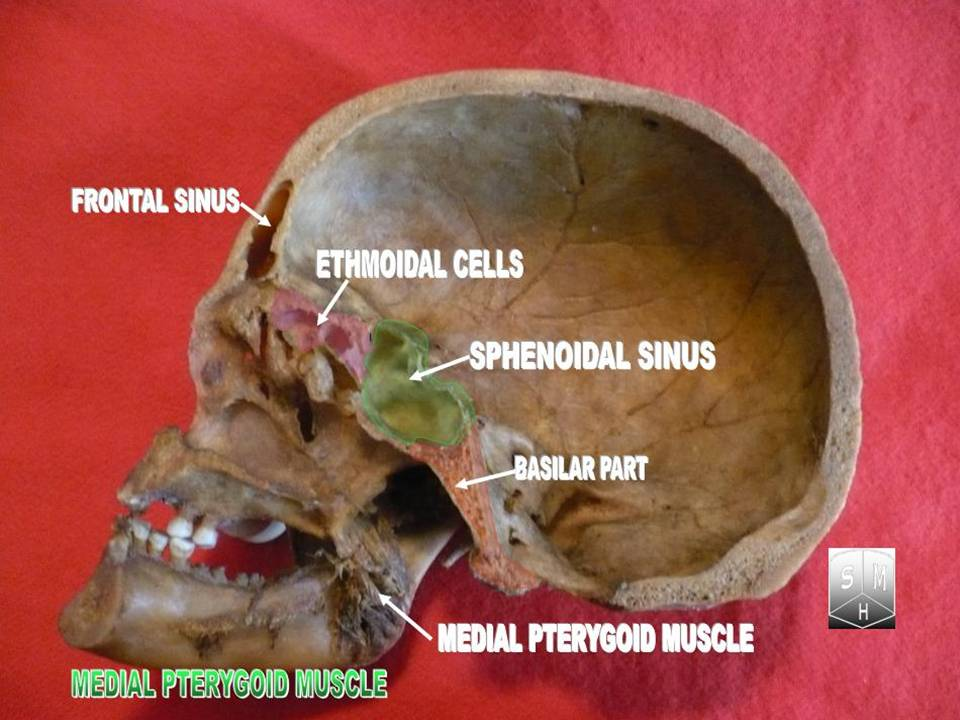
Medial pterygoid muscle

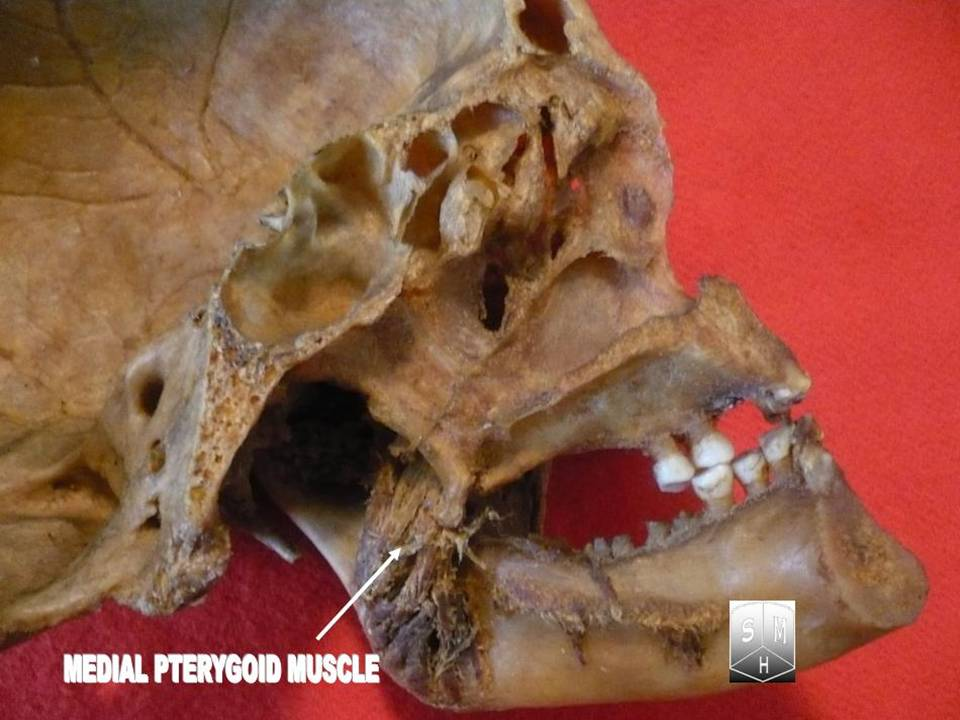
Medial pterygoid muscle

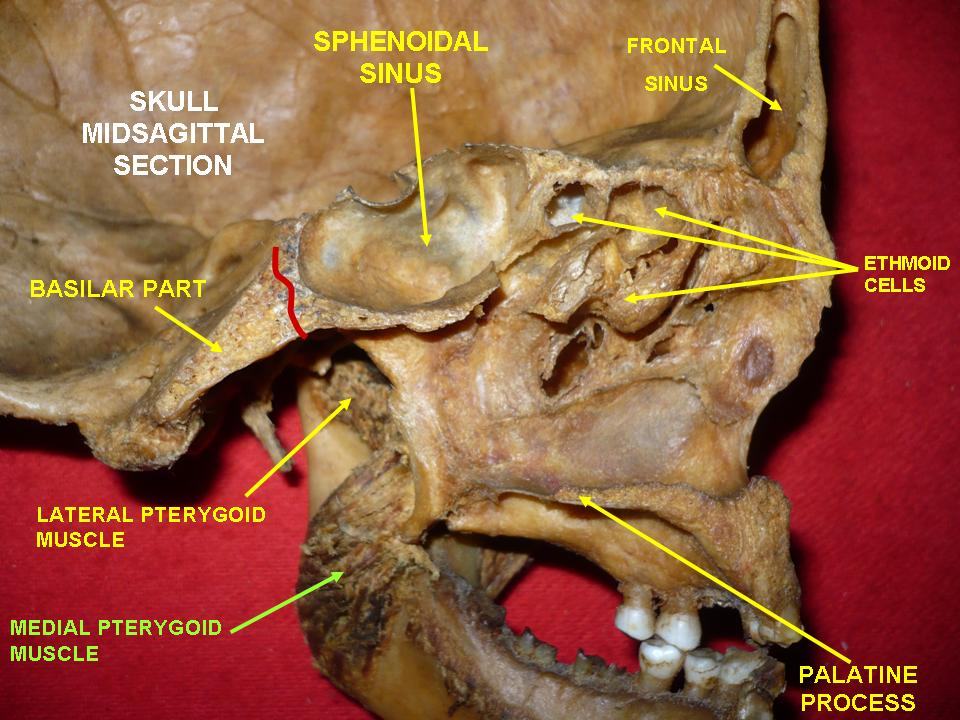
Medial pterygoid muscle

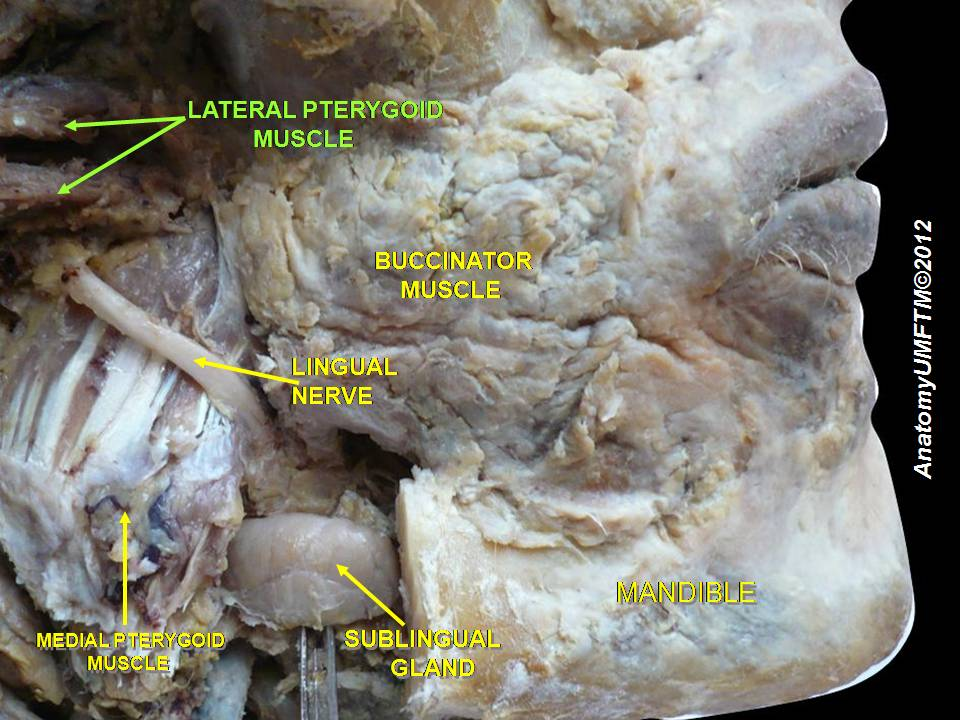
Medial pterygoid muscle

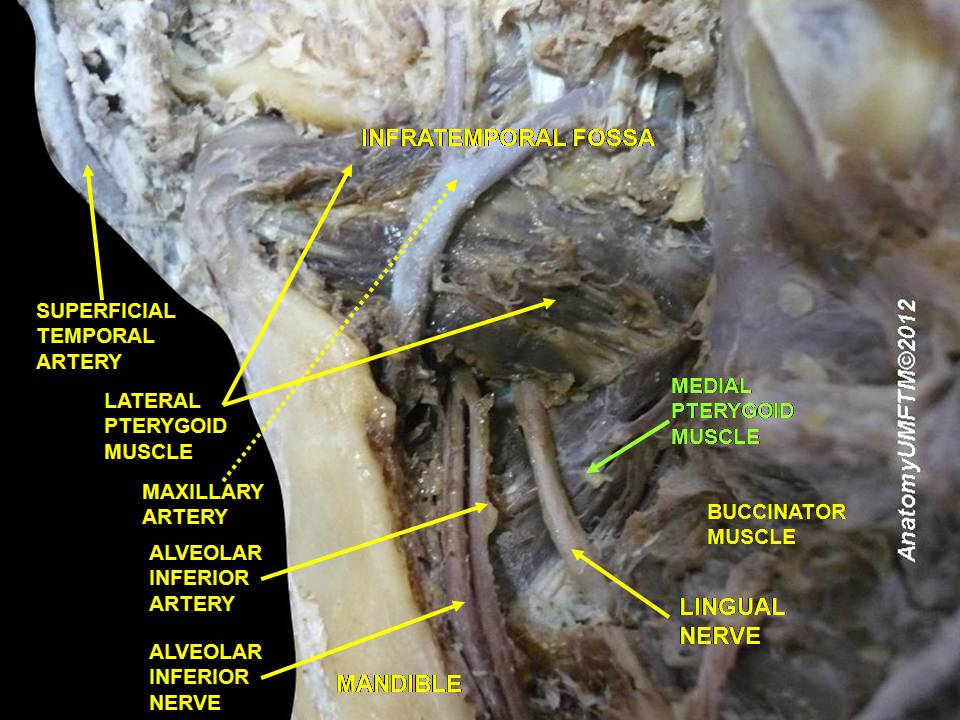
Medial pterygoid muscle

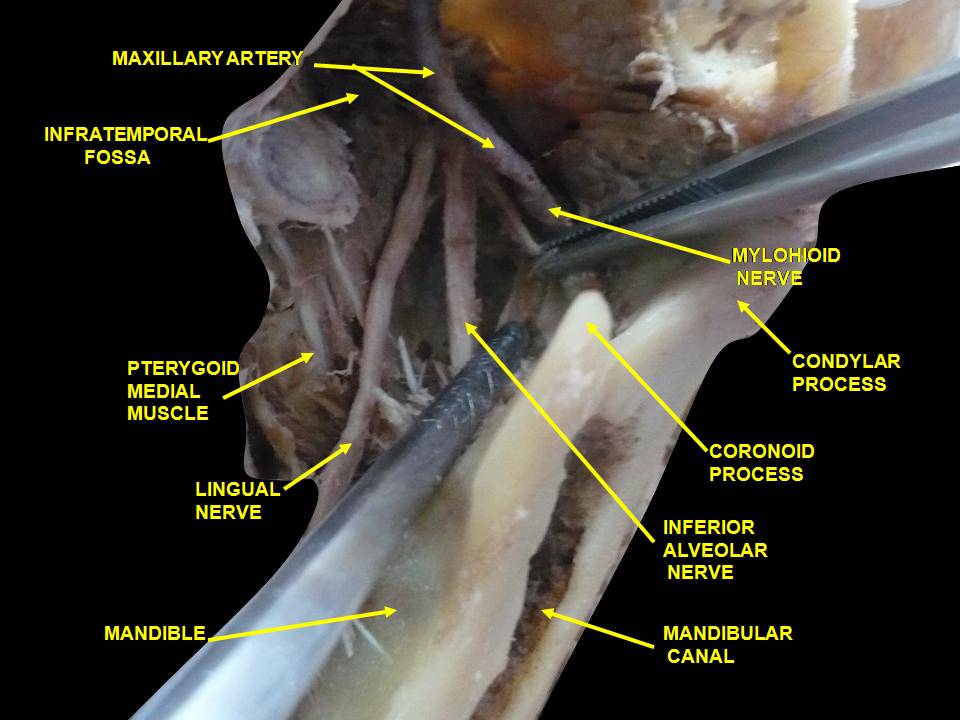
Infratemporal fossa. Lingual and inferior alveolar nerve. Deep dissection. Anterolateral view
