= Orbital fascia =

The orbital fascia forms the periosteum of the orbit.

It is loosely connected to the bones and can be readily separated from them.

Behind, it is united with the dura mater by processes which pass through the optic foramen and superior orbital fissure, and with the sheath of the optic nerve.

In front, it is connected with the periosteum at the margin of the orbit, and sends off a process which assists in forming the orbital septum.

From it, two processes are given off; one to enclose the lacrimal gland, the other to hold the pulley of the Obliquus superior in position.

== Anatomy ==
The orbital fascia consists of 3 parts:

=== Periorbita ===
Considered the periosteum of the bones forming the orbit , and is continuous with dura mater through the superior orbital fissure. It also forms the lacrimal sac.

=== Bulbar fascia ===
Also known as Tenon's capsule. It encapsulates the eyeball, forming a narrow space, called the Episcleral space, between the fascia and eyeball. This allows for the movement of the eyeball, while providing a socket that continues posteriorly with the optic nerve and its dural covering. Anteriorly it is attached to the corneoscleral junction.

=== Orbital septum ===
The framework that binds the orbital fat pad into the orbit. It also binds the palpebra to the bony orbit.

== Other contents of the orbital cavity ==
- Eyeball
- Lacrimal gland
- Extraocular muscles
- Orbital adipose tissue
- Optic nerve
- Oculomotor nerve branches
- Trochlear nerve branches
- Ophthalmic nerve branches
- Abducent nerve branches
- Ciliary ganglion
- Ophthalmic artery
- Ophthalmic veins
- Orbitalflobia
