= Infraorbital =

Infraorbital is an anatomical term which means, literally, inferior to (below or beneath) the eye socket (orbit). Some examples of uses of the term are:

- Infraorbital artery
- Infraorbital foramen
- Infraorbital canal
- Infraorbital groove
- Infraorbital nerve
