= Orbital apex syndrome =

- Other names: Jacod syndrome
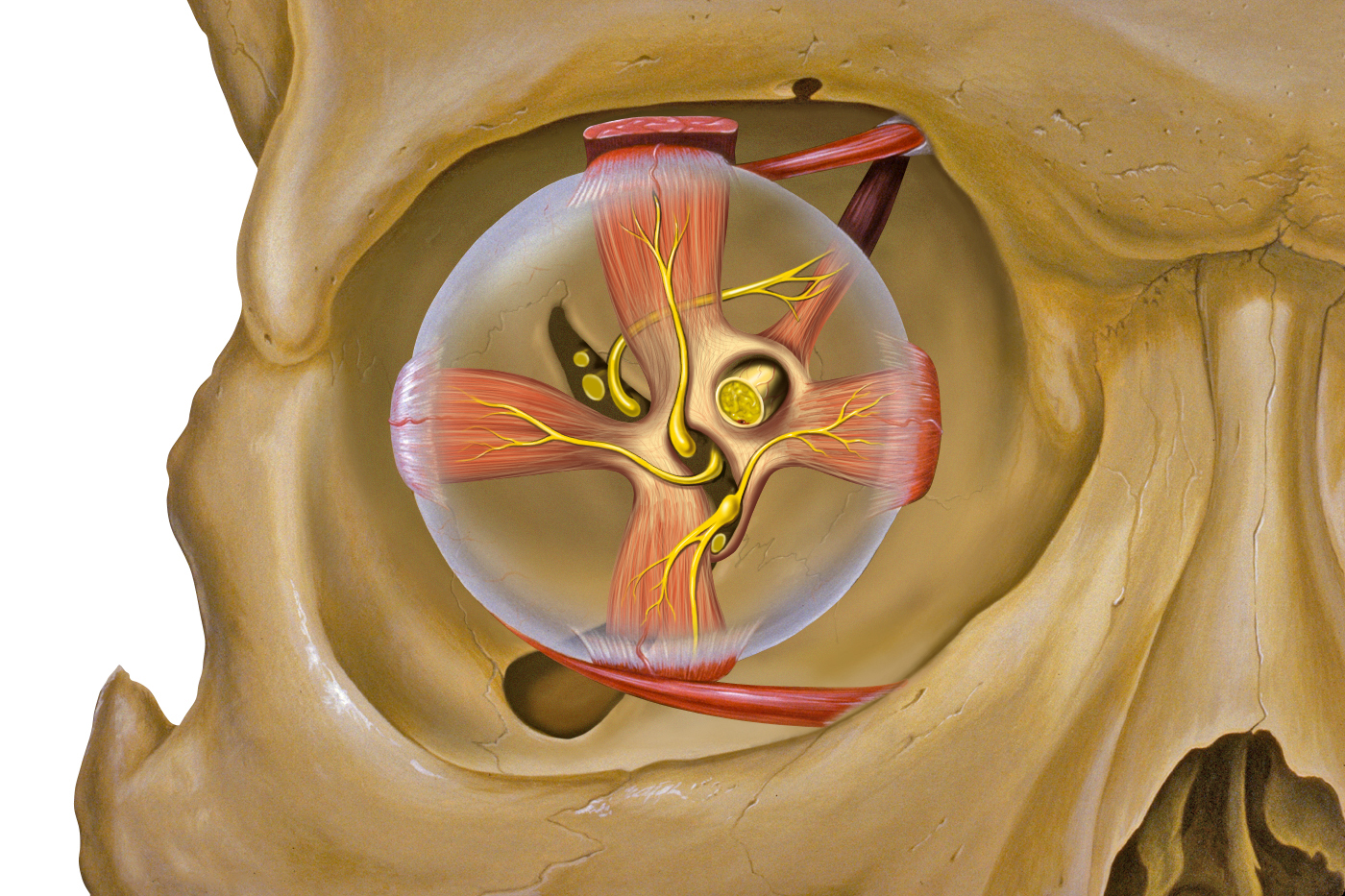
- Eye orbit anterior
- Specialty: Neurology/ophthalmology

Orbital apex syndrome is a collection of cranial nerve deficits associated with a mass lesion near the apex of the orbit of the eye. This syndrome is a separate entity from Rochon–Duvigneaud syndrome, which occurs due to a lesion immediately anterior to the orbital apex. Most commonly optic nerve is involved.

== Presentation ==
The most common finding is oculomotor nerve dysfunction leading to ophthalmoplegia. This is often accompanied by ophthalmic nerve dysfunction, leading to hypoesthesia of the upper face. The optic nerve may eventually be involved, with resulting visual loss.

Optic Nerve II Oculomotor Nerve III Trochlear Nerve IV Trigeminal V1 (Ophthalmic) Abduscent Nerve VI

== Causes ==
Jacod Syndrome is commonly associated with a tumor of the middle cranial fossa (near the apex of the orbit); but it can have several other causes.

=== Neoplastic causes ===
- Head and neck cancer
- Neural tumors
- Hematological cancer

=== Inflammatory causes ===
- Sarcoidosis
- Systemic lupus erythematosus
- Eosinophilic granulomatosis with polyangiitis
- Granulomatosis with polyangiitis
- Giant cell arteritis
- Thyroid disease

=== Traumatic causes ===
- Iatrogenic (following surgery)
- Orbital apex fracture
- Penetrating injury

=== Vascular causes ===
- Carotid aneurysm

== Diagnosis ==
Diagnostic methods vary, and are based on specific possible etiologies; however, an X-ray computed tomography scan of the face (or magnetic resonance imaging, or both) may be helpful.

== Treatment ==
Treatment mainly depends on the causative factors and requires multidisciplinary management involving multiple speciality care. Finding the etiology and treating the etiology is the mainstay of treatment. Infectious etiology to be treated as per necessary treatments. Fungal infections has to be kept in mind. Steroids play major role if it is due to inflammatory etiology due to compression on optic nerve. If it is secondary to tumors, oncologist play a major role.
