= Orbital fissure =

Orbital fissure may refer to:

- Inferior orbital fissure
- Superior orbital fissure
