= Lesser wing of sphenoid bone =

Part of the sphenoid bone in the skull.

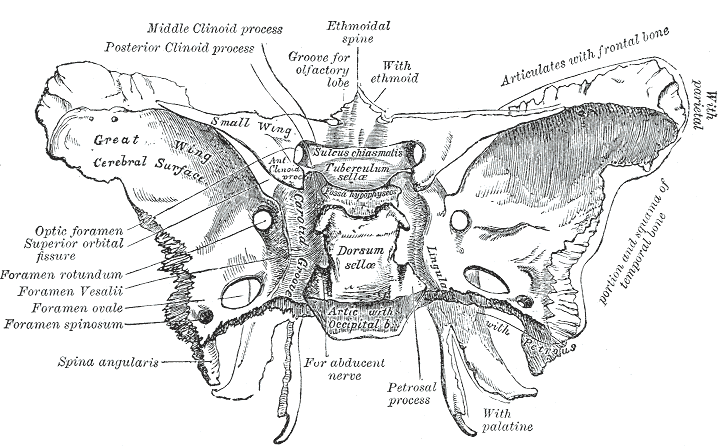
- Figure 1: Sphenoid bone, upper surface.

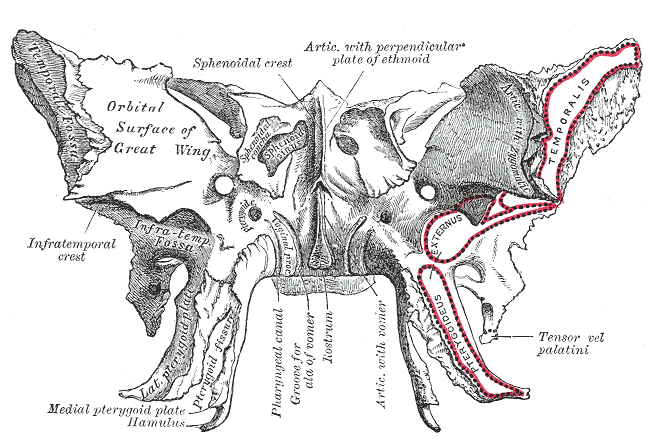
- Figure 2: Sphenoid bone, anterior and inferior surfaces.

Details

Identifiers
- Latin: ala minor ossis sphenoidalis, ala orbitalis ossis sphenoidalis, ala parva ossis sphenoidalis
- TA98: A02.1.05.020
- TA2: 604
- FMA: 52869

The lesser wings of the sphenoid are two thin triangular plates, which arise from the upper and anterior parts of the body, and, projecting laterally, end in sharp points.

In some animals, they remain as separate bones called orbitosphenoids.

== Structure ==
The main features of the lesser wing are the optic canal, the anterior clinoid process, and the superior orbital fissure.

=== Surfaces ===
The superior surface of each is flat, and supports part of the frontal lobe of the brain. The inferior surface forms the back part of the roof of the orbit, and the upper boundary of the superior orbital fissure.

This fissure is of a triangular form, and leads from the cavity of the cranium into that of the orbit: it is bounded medially by the body; above, by the small wing; below, by the medial margin of the orbital surface of the great wing; and is completed laterally by the frontal bone.

It transmits the oculomotor nerve, the trochlear nerve, and the abducent nerve, the three branches of the ophthalmic division of the trigeminal nerve, some filaments from the cavernous plexus of the sympathetic nervous system, the orbital branch of the middle meningeal artery, a recurrent branch from the lacrimal artery to the dura mater, and the ophthalmic vein.

=== Borders ===
The anterior border is serrated for articulation with the frontal bone.

The posterior border, smooth and rounded, is received into the lateral fissure of the brain; the medial end of this border forms the anterior clinoid process, which gives attachment to the tentorium cerebelli; it is sometimes joined to the middle clinoid process by a spicule of bone, and when this occurs the termination of the groove for the internal carotid artery is converted into a foramen (carotico-clinoid).

The lesser wing is connected to the body by two roots, the upper thin and flat, the lower thick and triangular; between the two roots is the optic foramen, for the transmission of the optic nerve and ophthalmic artery.

== In other animals ==
In many tetrapods, the orbitosphenoids are unfused paired elements that forms the floor of the anteriormost part of the braincase. In most living and extinct reptiles, including turtles, tuataras, and most squamates, the orbitosphenoids are unossified and made of cartilage; however, in archosaurs and select squamates the element is ossified.

== Additional images ==
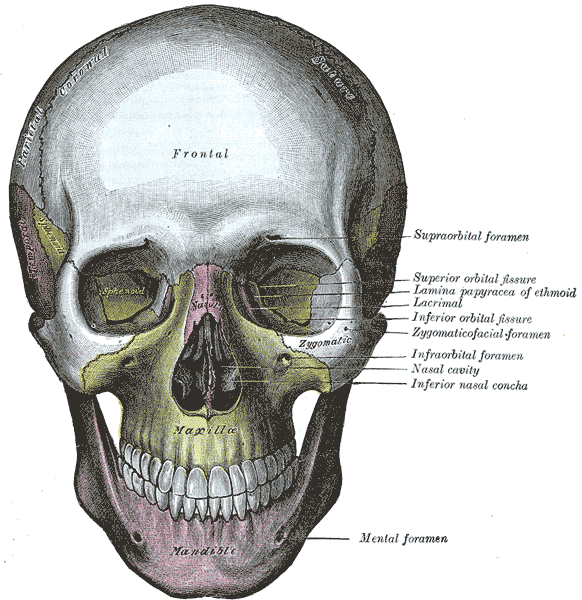
The skull from the front.

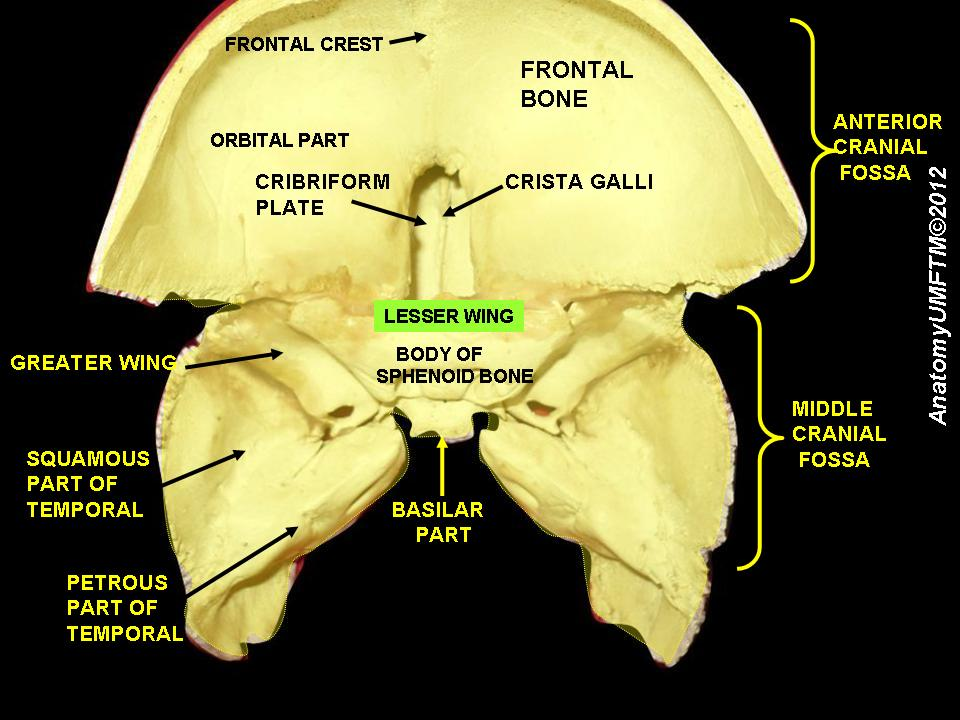
Lesser wing of sphenoid bone

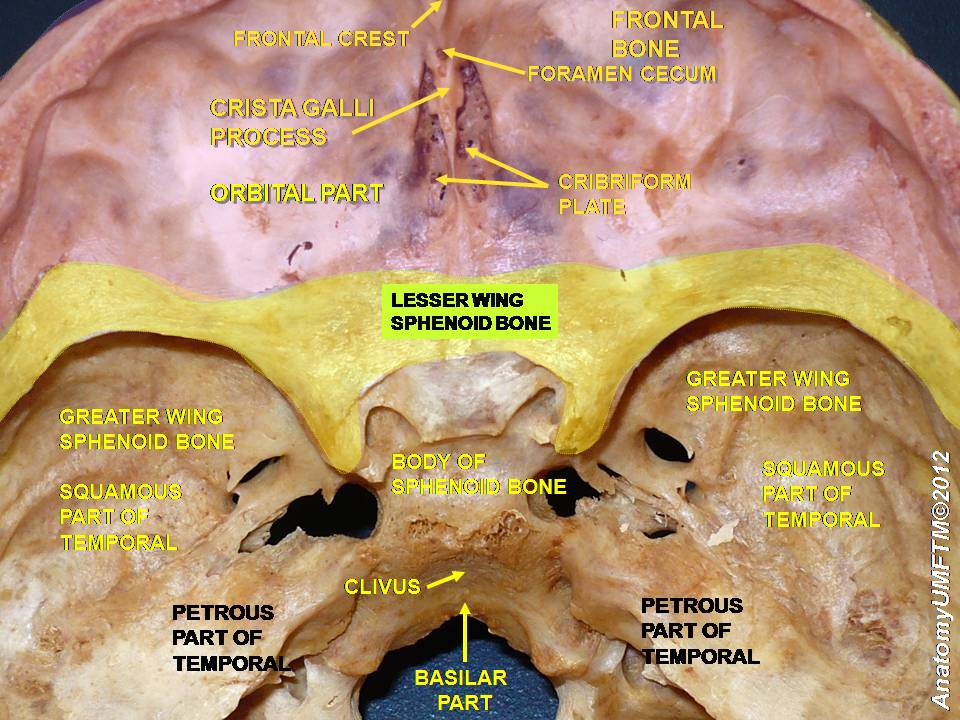
Lesser wing of sphenoid bone

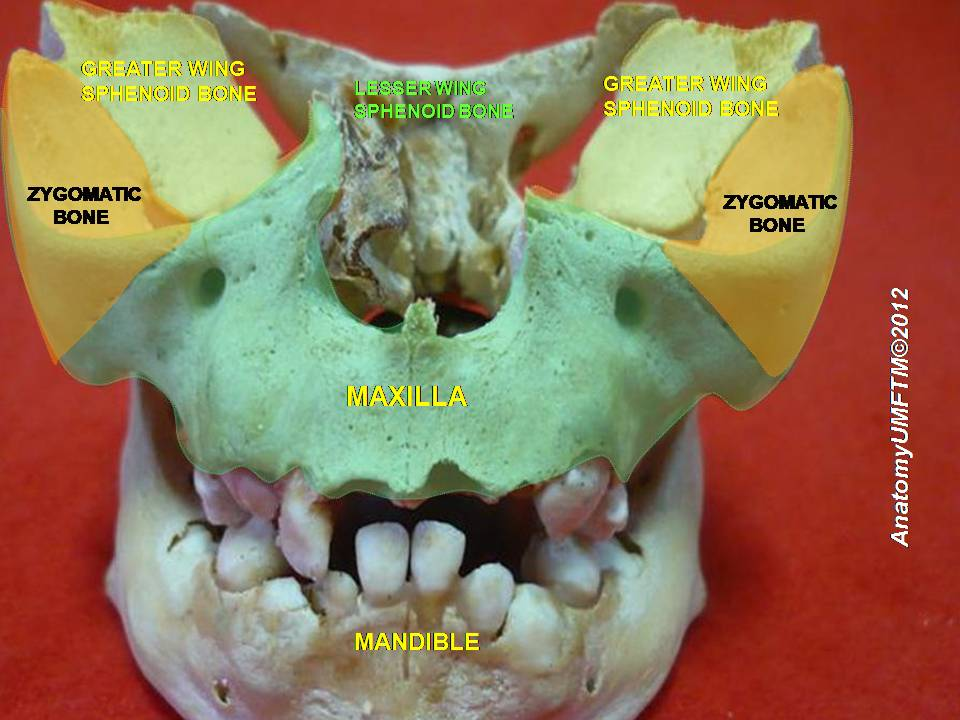
Lesser wing of sphenoid bone

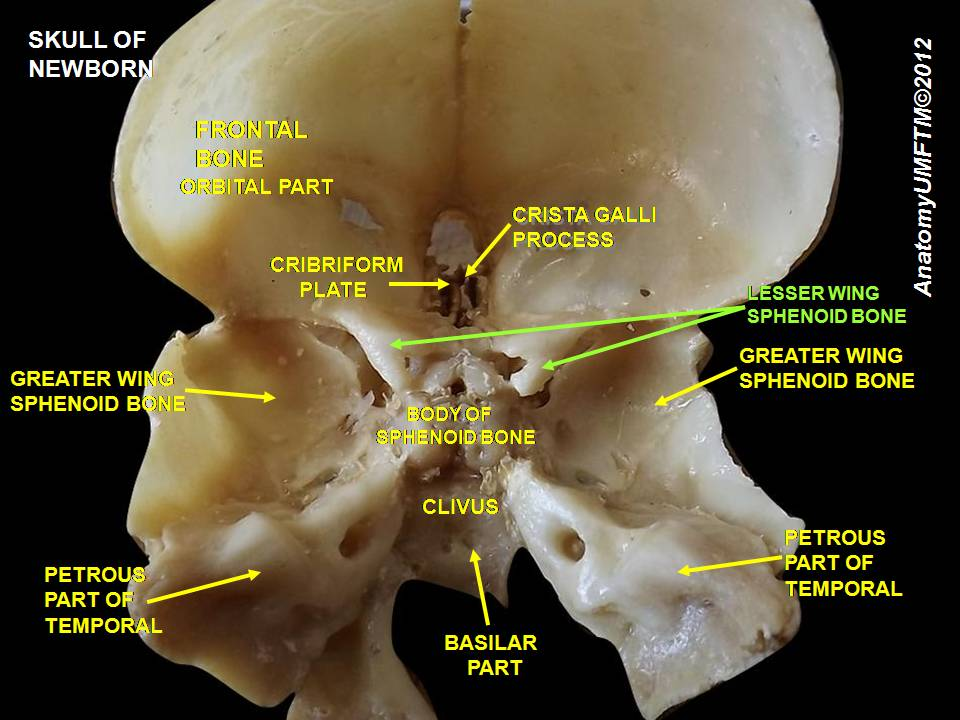
Lesser wing of sphenoid bone
