= Wing of sphenoid bone =

Wing of sphenoid bone or ala ossis sphenoidalis can refer to:

- Greater wing of sphenoid bone (ala major ossis sphenoidalis)
- Lesser wing of sphenoid bone (ala minor ossis sphenoidalis)
