= Ophthalmic =

Ophthalmic means pertaining to the eye, and can refer to:

- Ophthalmology
- Ophthalmic nerve
- Ophthalmic artery
- Ophthalmic veins
- Ophthalmic drug administration, as with eye drops

== See also ==
- Ophthalmia
