= Vorticose veins =

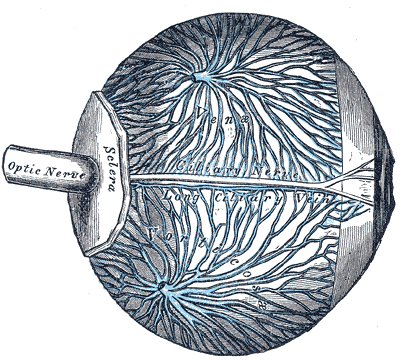
- The veins of the choroid. (Venae vorticosae labeled - though difficult to see - at center.)

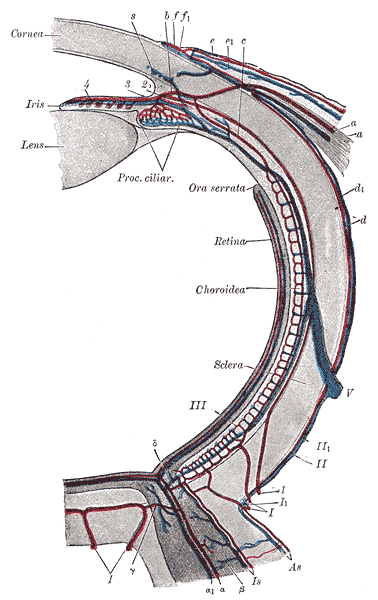
- Diagram of the blood vessels of the eye, as seen in a horizontal section. ("V", at center right, is the label for the vena vorticosa)

Details
- Drains to: Superior ophthalmic vein, and inferior ophthalmic vein
- Artery: Short posterior ciliary arteries

Identifiers
- Latin: venae vorticosae
- TA98: A12.3.06.106
- TA2: 4892
- FMA: 70880

The vorticose veins, commonly known as the vortex veins, are veins that drain the choroid of the eye. Usually, there are four vorticose veins in each eye, but can vary up to eight in number. There is at least one vorticose vein per each quadrant of the eye, located at the lateral and medial sides of the superior and inferior rectus muscles. Vorticose veins drain into the superior ophthalmic vein, and inferior ophthalmic vein.

Vorticose veins are an important opthalmoscopic landmark.

== Structure ==
=== Course and relations ===
Vorticose veins exit the eyeball 6 mm posterior to its equator. In typical anatomy, both upper vorticose veins empty into the superior ophthalmic vein, and both lower vorticose veins drain into the inferior ophthalmic vein.

=== Variation ===
The number of vorticose veins is known to vary from four to eight, with about 65% of the normal population having four with at least one vein in each quadrant.

== Clinical significance ==
Vorticose veins are an important ophthalmoscopic landmark. They can be visualised in a dilated pupil using an indirect ophthalmoscope.

== Additional images ==
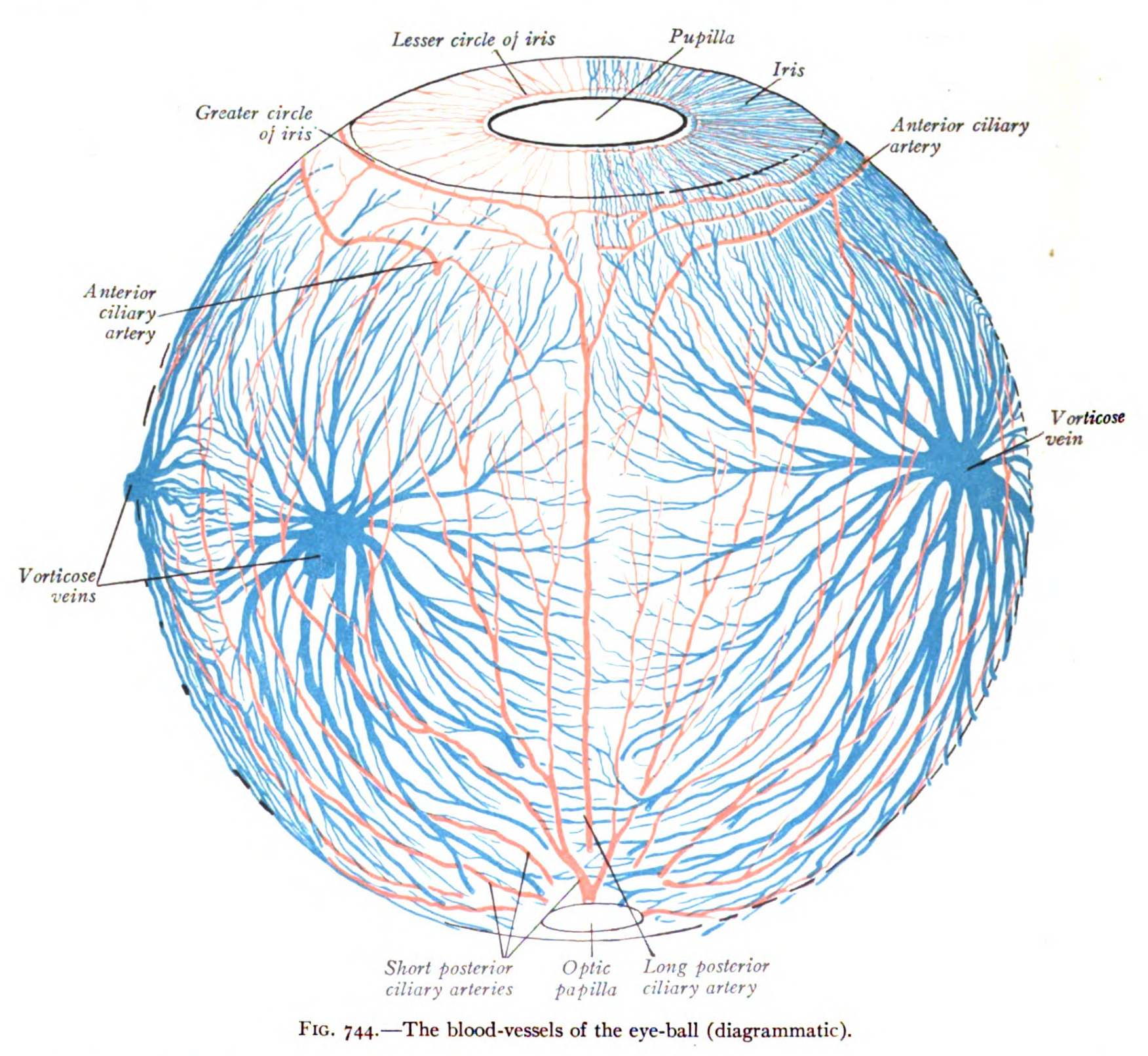
The blood-vessels of the eyeball (diagrammatic).
