= Ophryon =

The ophryon is the point in the forehead just above the optic foramen, or eyesocket, and glabella.
