= Infraorbital vein =

Vein draining structures in the eye socket

Details
- Drains to: Pterygoid venous plexus
- Artery: Infraorbital artery

The infraorbital vein is a vein that drains structures of the floor of the orbit. It arises on the face and passes backwards through the orbit alongside infraorbital artery and nerve, exiting the orbit through the inferior orbital fissure to drain into the pterygoid venous plexus.

== Anatomy ==
=== Origin ===
The infraorbital vein arises on the face by the union of several tributaries.

=== Course and relations ===
Accompanied by the infraorbital artery and the infraorbital nerve, it passes posteriorly through the infraorbital foramen, infraorbital canal, and infraorbital groove. It exits the orbit through the inferior orbital fissure to drain into the pterygoid venous plexus.

=== Distribution ===
The infraorbital vein drains structures of the floor of the orbit; receives tributaries from structures that lie close to the floor of the orbit.

=== Anastomoses ===
The infraorbital vein communicates with the inferior ophthalmic vein. It may sometimes additionally also communicate with the facial vein on the face.
