= Inferior orbital fissure =

Gap between bones of the human eye socket

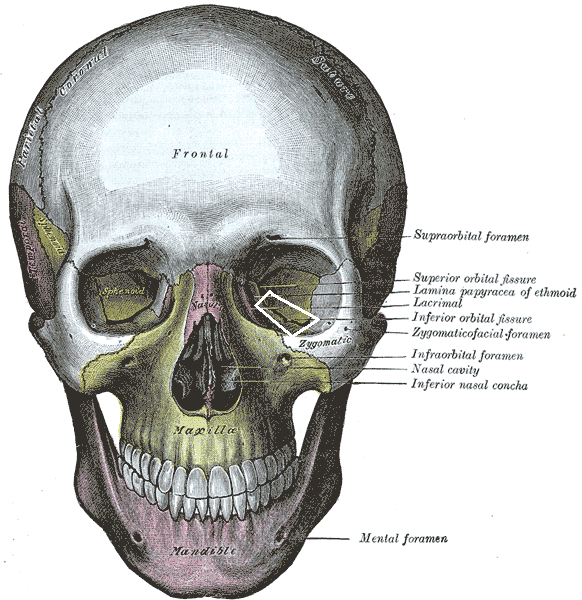
- The skull from the front. (Label for inferior orbital fissure is at center right.)

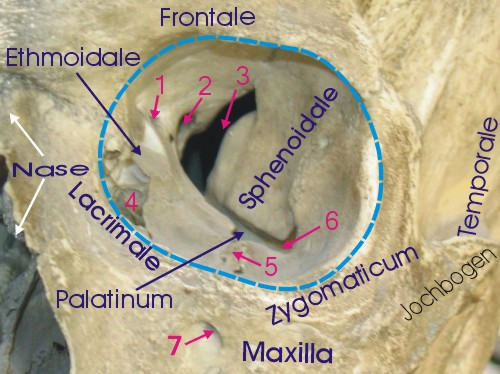
- 1 Foramen ethmoidale, 2 Canalis opticus, 3 Fissura orbitalis superior, 4 Fossa sacci lacrimalis, 5 Sulcus infraorbitalis, 6 Fissura orbitalis inferior, 7 Foramen infraorbitale

Details

Identifiers
- Latin: fissura orbitalis inferior
- TA98: A02.1.00.084
- TA2: 489
- FMA: 54802

The inferior orbital fissure is a gap between the greater wing of sphenoid bone, and the maxilla. It connects the orbit (anteriorly) with the infratemporal fossa and pterygopalatine fossa (posteriorly).

== Anatomy ==
The medial end of the inferior orbital fissure diverges laterally from the medial end of the superior orbital fissure. It is situated between the lateral wall of the orbit and the floor of the orbit.

=== Contents ===
The fissure gives passage to multiple structures, including:

- Infraorbital nerve, artery and vein
- Inferior ophthalmic vein
- Zygomatic nerve
- Orbital branches of the pharyngeal nerve
- Maxillary nerve

== Additional images ==
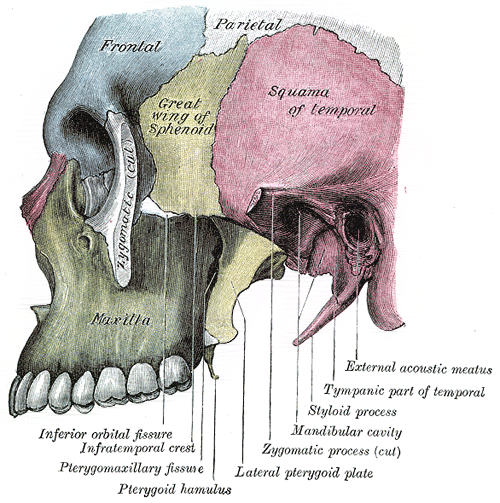
Left infratemporal fossa.

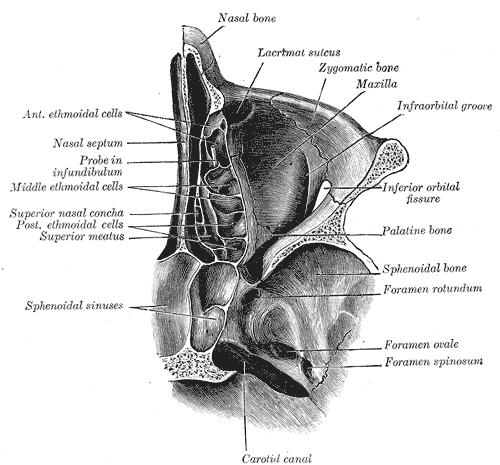
Horizontal section of nasal and orbital cavities.

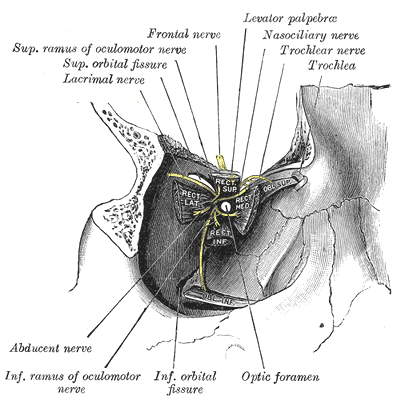
Dissection showing origins of right ocular muscles, and nerves entering by the superior orbital fissure.

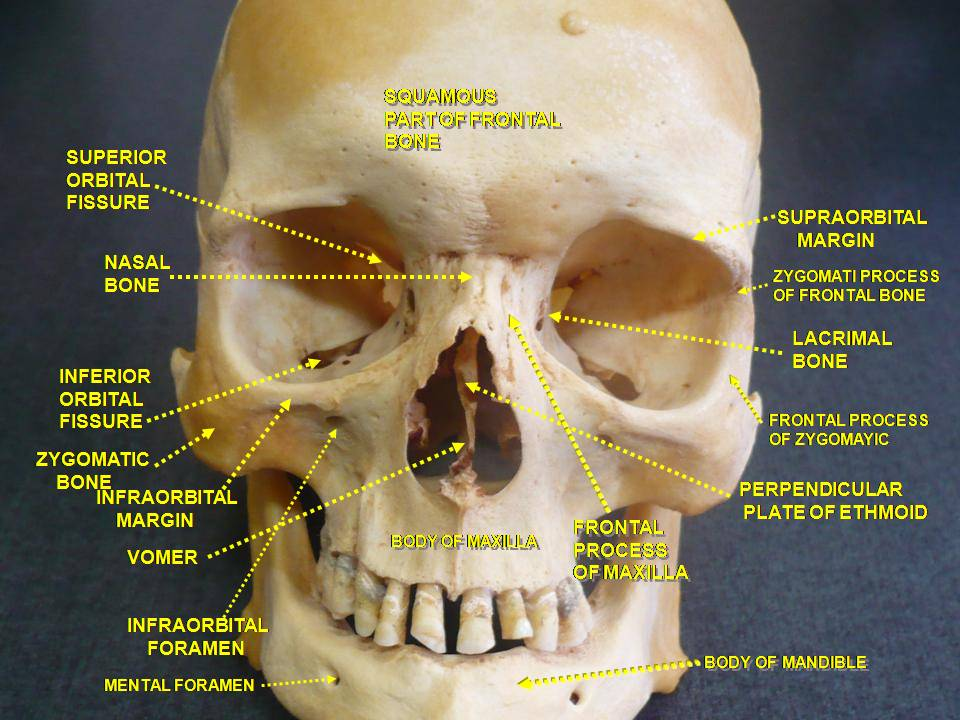
Inferior orbital fissure.

== See also ==
- Foramina of skull
- Superior orbital fissure
