= Superior orbital fissure =

Foramen in the skull allowing for passage of cranial nerves

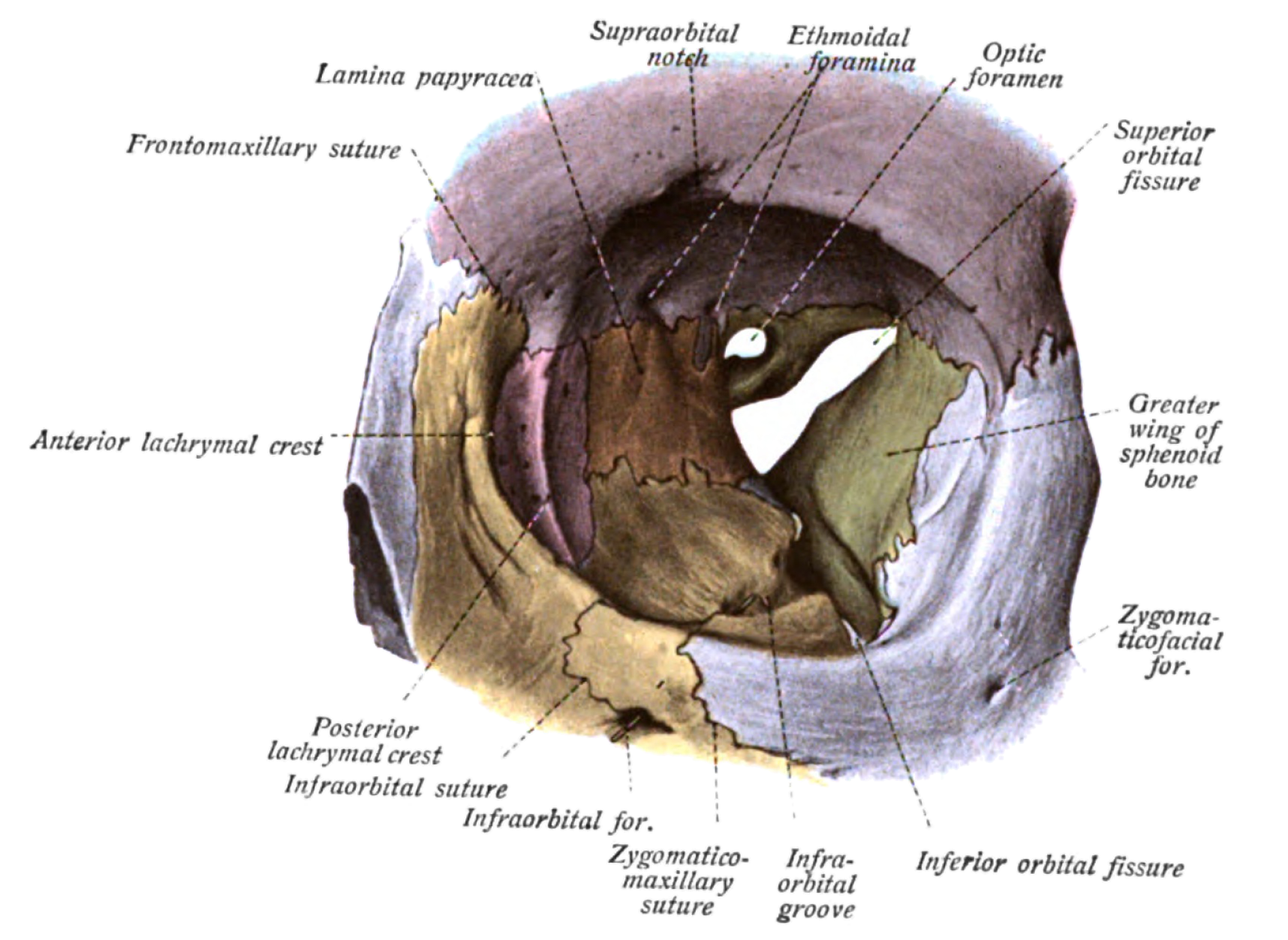
- Orbit seen from the front, with bones labeled in different colors, and superior orbital fissure at center as an "hour-glass" formation

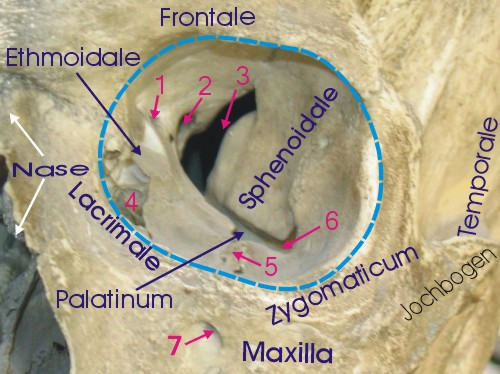
- 1 Foramen ethmoidale, 2 Canalis opticus, 3 Fissura orbitalis superior, 4 Fossa sacci lacrimalis, 5 Sulcus infraorbitalis, 6 Fissura orbitalis inferior, 7 Foramen infraorbitale

Details
- Part of: Sphenoid bone
- System: Skeletal

Identifiers
- Latin: fissura orbitalis superior
- TA98: A02.1.05.023; A02.1.00.083
- TA2: 488
- FMA: 54799

The superior orbital fissure is a foramen or cleft of the skull between the lesser and greater wings of the sphenoid bone. It gives passage to multiple structures, including the oculomotor nerve, trochlear nerve, ophthalmic nerve, abducens nerve, ophthalmic veins, and sympathetic fibres from the cavernous plexus.

== Structure ==
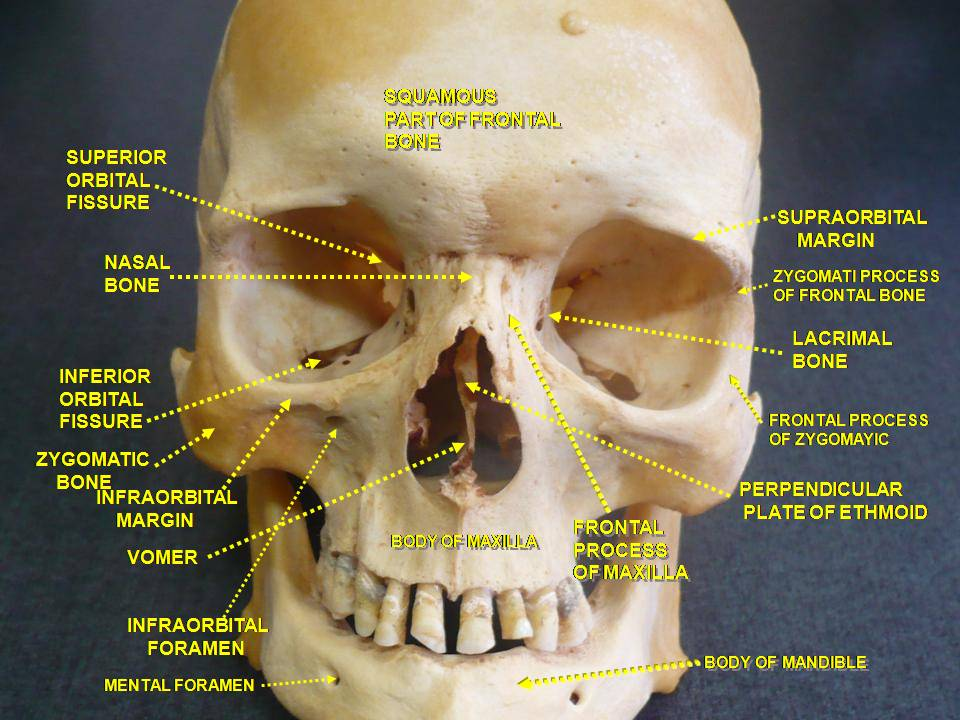
Superior orbital fissure

The superior orbital fissure is usually 22 mm wide in adults, and is much larger medially. Its boundaries are formed by the (caudal surface of the) lesser wing of the sphenoid bone, and (medial border of the) greater wing of the sphenoid bone.

=== Contents ===
The superior orbital fissure is traversed by the following structures:

- (superior and inferior divisions of the) oculomotor nerve (CN III)
- trochlear nerve (CN IV)
- lacrimal, frontal, and nasociliary branches of ophthalmic nerve (CN V_{1})
- abducens nerve (CN VI)
- superior ophthalmic vein and superior division of the inferior ophthalmic vein
- sympathetic fibres from the cavernous nerve plexus
- recurrent meningeal branch of lacrimal artery (anastomotic branch of lacrimal artery with the middle meningeal artery)

The superior orbital fissure is divided into three parts from lateral to medial:

- Lateral part transmits: superior ophthalmic vein, lacrimal nerve, frontal nerve, trochlear nerve (CN IV), recurrent meningeal branch of lacrimal artery (anastomotic branch of lacrimal artery with the middle meningeal artery)
- Middle part transmits: Superior and inferior divisions of the oculomotor nerve (CN III), nasociliary nerve (lies between the two divisions of oculomotor nerve) and abducent nerve
- Medial part transmits: Inferior ophthalmic veins and sympathetic nerves arising from the plexus that accompanies the internal carotid artery

== Clinical significance ==
Multiple anatomical structures pass through the fissure, and can be damaged in orbital trauma, particularly blowout fractures through the floor of the orbit into the maxillary sinus.

The abducens nerve is most likely to show signs of damage first, with the most common complaints retro-orbital pain and the involvement of cranial nerves III, IV, V1, and VI without other neurological signs or symptoms. This presentation indicates either compression of structures in the superior orbital fissure or the cavernous sinus.

=== Superior orbital fissure syndrome ===
Superior orbital fissure syndrome, also known as Rochon-Duvigneaud's syndrome, is a neurological disorder that results if the superior orbital fissure is fractured. Involvement of the cranial nerves that pass through the superior orbital fissure may lead to diplopia, paralysis of extraocular muscles, exophthalmos, and ptosis. Blindness or loss of vision indicates involvement of the orbital apex, which is more serious, requiring urgent surgical intervention. Typically, if blindness is present with superior orbital syndrome, it is called orbital apex syndrome.

== See also ==
- Foramina of skull
- Inferior orbital fissure
