= Optic canal =

Feature of the human skull

Optic foramen
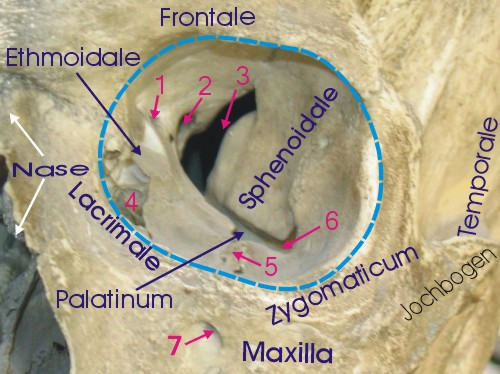
- 1: Foramen ethmoidale 2: Canalis opticus 3: Fissura orbitalis superior 4: Fossa sacci lacrimalis 5: Sulcus infraorbitalis 6: Fissura orbitalis inferior 7: Foramen infraorbitale

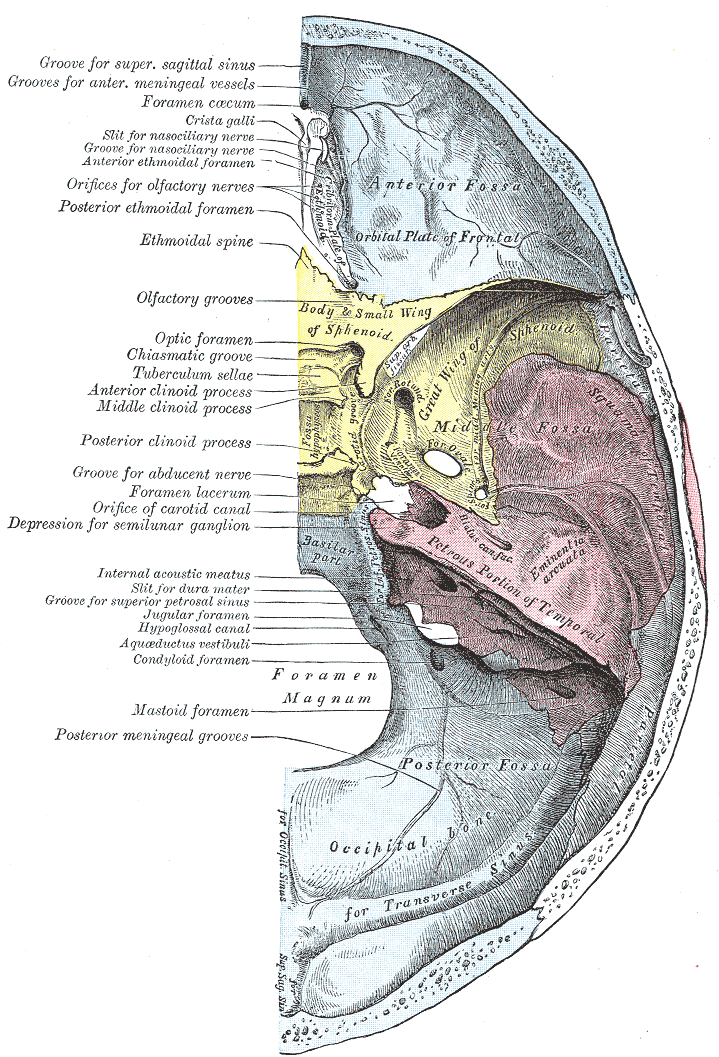
- Base of the skull. Upper surface. (On the left, "Optic foramen" is the 12th label from the top.

Details

Identifiers
- Latin: canalis opticus, foramen opticum ossis sphenoidalis
- TA98: A02.1.05.021
- TA2: 605
- FMA: 54774

The optic foramen is the opening to the optic canal. The canal is located in the sphenoid bone; it is bounded medially by the body of the sphenoid and laterally by the lesser wing of the sphenoid.

The superior surface of the sphenoid bone is bounded behind by a ridge, which forms the anterior border of a narrow, transverse groove, the chiasmatic groove (optic groove), above and behind which lies the optic chiasma; the groove ends on either side in the optic foramen, which transmits the optic nerve and ophthalmic artery (with accompanying sympathetic nerve fibres) into the orbital cavity. Compared to the optic nerve, the ophthalmic artery is located inferolaterally within the canal.

The left and right optic canals are 25mm apart posteriorly and 30mm apart anteriorly. The canals themselves are funnel-shaped (narrowest anteriorly).

== Additional images ==
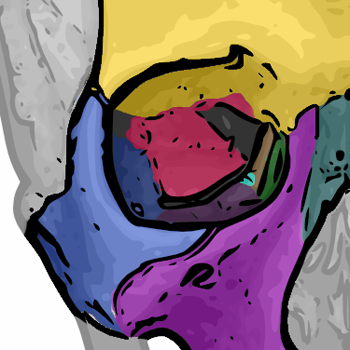
The seven bones which articulate to form the orbit.

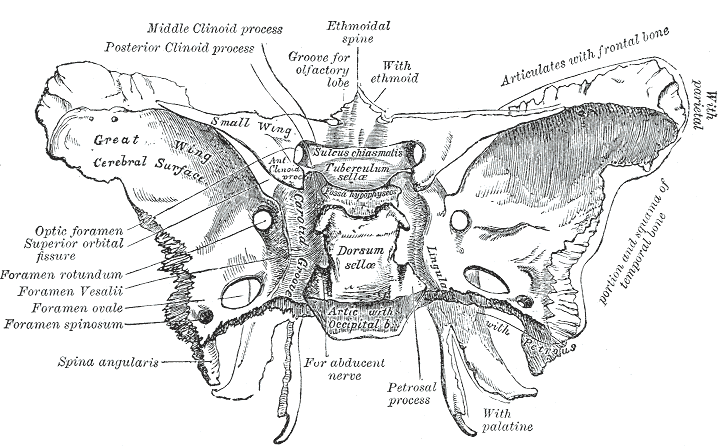
Sphenoid bone. Upper surface.

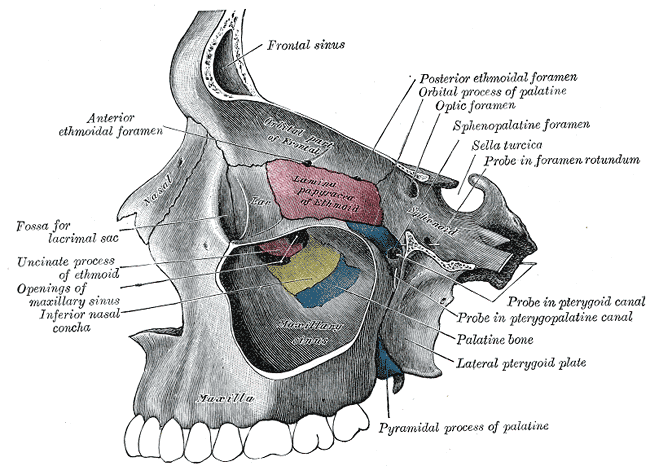
Medial wall of left orbit.

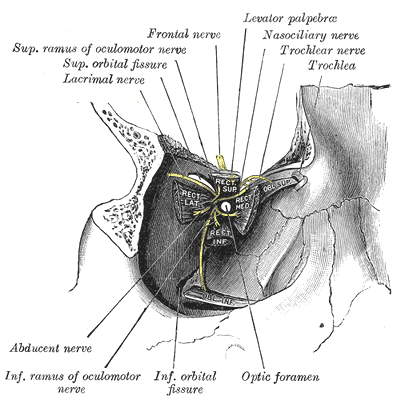
Dissection showing origins of right ocular muscles, and nerves entering by the superior orbital fissure.

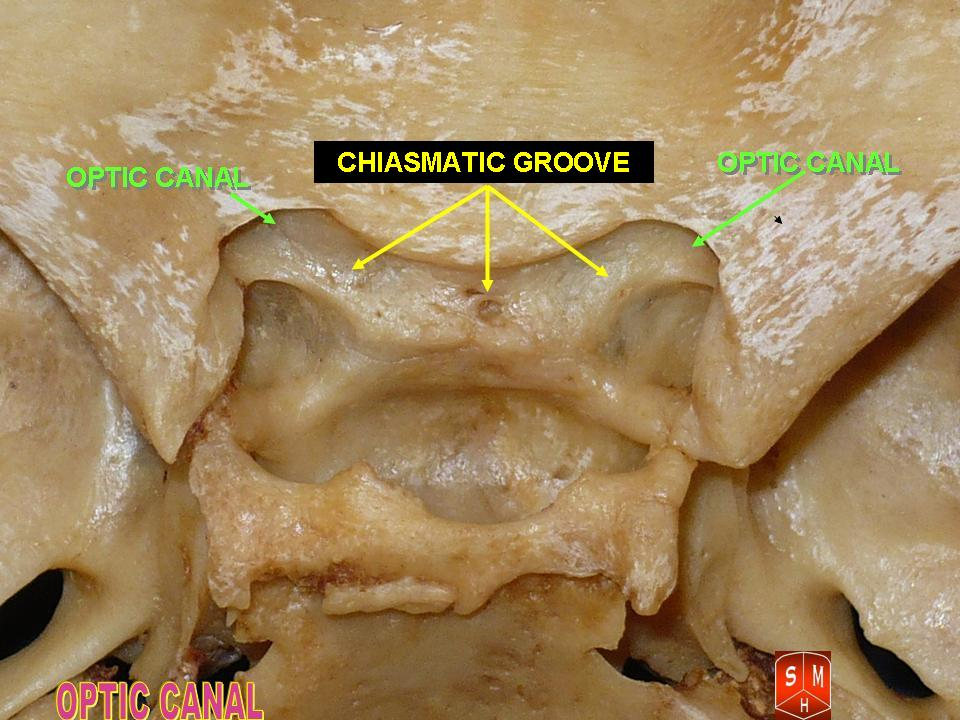
Optic canal

== See also ==
- Foramina of skull
- Ophryon
