= Ophthalmic veins =

Blood vessels of the eye

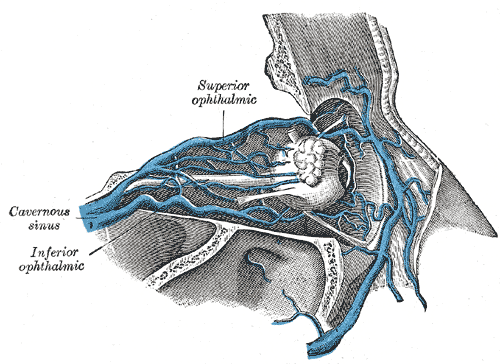
- Veins of orbit.

Details
- Drains to: Cavernous sinus

Identifiers
- Latin: Venae ophthalmicae

Ophthalmic veins are veins which drain the eye.

More specifically, they can refer to:

- Superior ophthalmic vein
- Inferior ophthalmic vein
